= Timeline of Mars Science Laboratory =

Event timeline of the NASA Mars Science Laboratory mission

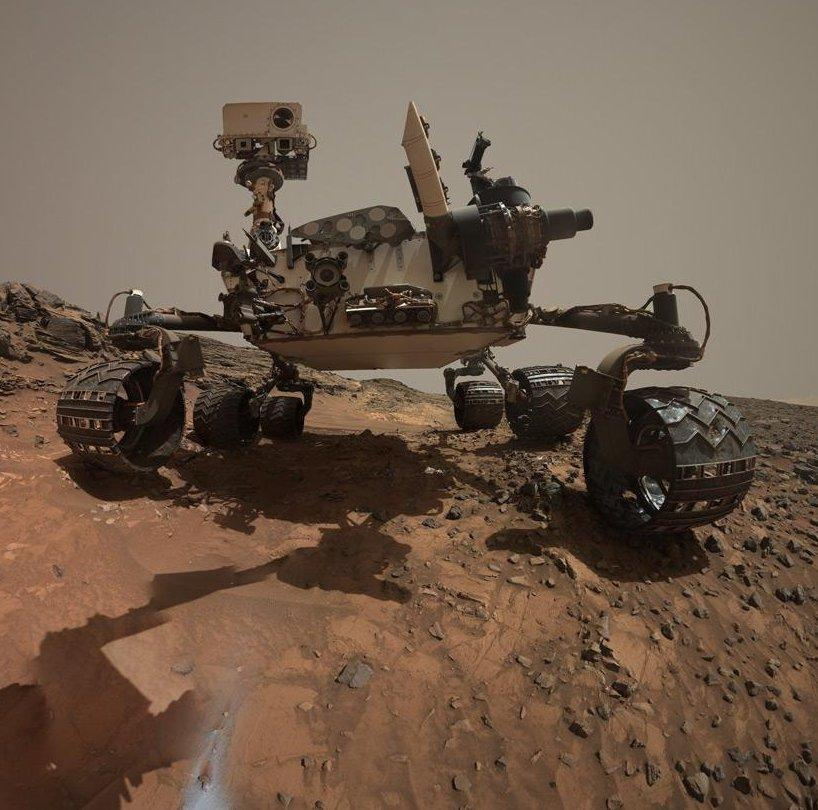
Curiosity rover on Mars (5 August 2015)

The Mars Science Laboratory and its rover, Curiosity, were launched from Earth on 26 November 2011. As of November 10, 2026, Curiosity has been in Gale Crater on the planet Mars for 5070 sols (5209 total days; 14 years, 96 days) since landing on 6 August 2012. (See Current status.)

== Mission overview ==
=== Prelaunch (2004–2011) ===
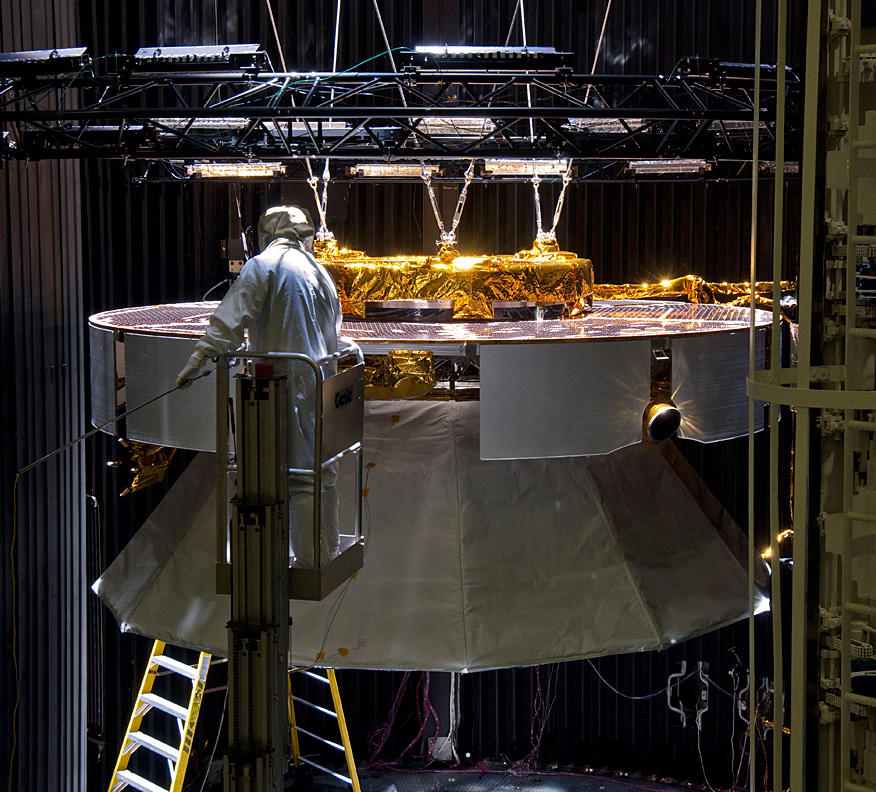
Cruise stage is tested in 2010.

In April 2004, the United States National Aeronautics and Space Administration (NASA) called for scientific experiments and instruments proposals for the Mars Science Laboratory and rover mission. Launch was proposed for September 2009. By 14 December 2004, eight proposals were selected, including instruments from Russia and Spain.

Testing of components also began in late 2004, including Aerojet's monopropellant engine with the ability to throttle from 15 to 100 percent thrust with a fixed propellant inlet pressure. By November 2008 most hardware and software development was complete, and testing continued. At this point, cost overruns were approximately $400 million. In December 2008, lift-off was delayed to November 2011 due to insufficient time for testing and integration.

Between 23–29 March 2009, the general public ranked nine finalist rover names (Adventure, Amelia, Journey, Perception, Pursuit, Sunrise, Vision, Wonder, and Curiosity) through a public poll on the NASA website. On 27 May 2009, the winning name was announced to be Curiosity. The name had been submitted in an essay contest by Clara Ma, a then sixth-grader from Kansas.

==== Landing site selection ====
At the first MSL Landing Site workshop, 33 potential landing sites were identified. By the second workshop in late 2007, the list had grown to include almost 50 sites, and by the end of the workshop, the list was reduced to six; in November 2008, project leaders at a third workshop reduced the list to these four landing sites:

Name	Location	Elevation	Notes
Eberswalde Crater	23.86°S 326.73°E	−1,450 m (−4,760 ft)	Ancient river delta.
Holden Crater	26.37°S 325.10°E	−1,940 m (−6,360 ft)	Dry lake bed.
Gale Crater	4.49°S 137.42°E	−4,451 m (−14,603 ft)	Features 5 km (3.1 mi) tall mountain of layered material near center. selected.
Mawrth Vallis	24.01°N 341.03°E	−2,246 m (−7,369 ft)	Channel carved by catastrophic floods.

A fourth landing site workshop was held in late September 2010, and the fifth and final workshop 16–18 May 2011. On 22 July 2011, it was announced that Gale Crater had been selected as the landing site of the Mars Science Laboratory mission.

=== Launch (2011) ===
MSL Launch - 26 November 2011 15:02:00.211 UTC

MSL was launched from Cape Canaveral Air Force Station Space Launch Complex 41 on 26 November 2011, at 10:02 EST (15:02 UTC) aboard an Atlas V 541 provided by United Launch Alliance. The first and second rocket stages, along with the rocket motors, were stacked on 9 October 2011, near the launch pad. The fairing containing the spacecraft was transported to the launch pad on 3 November 2011.

On 13 December 2011, the rover began monitoring space radiation to aid in planning for future crewed missions to Mars.

The interplanetary journey to Mars took more than eight months, time during which, the spacecraft performed four trajectory corrections: on 11 January, 26 March, 26 June and on 28 July. Mission design had allowed for a maximum of 6 trajectory correction opportunities.

=== Landing (2012) ===
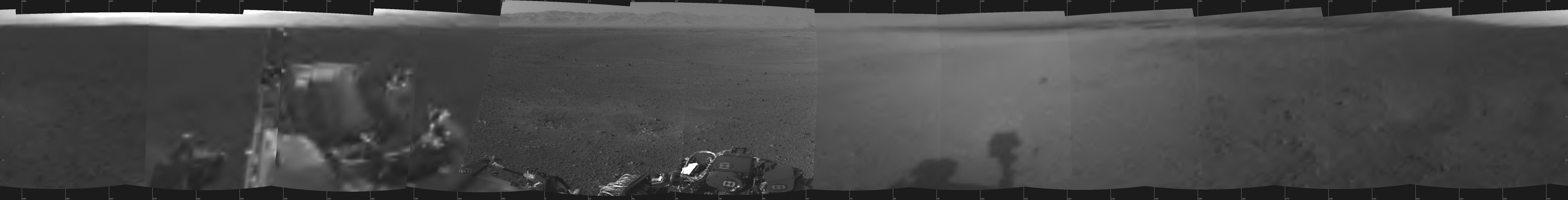
First 360-degree panoramic view of Mars taken by the Curiosity rover (7 August 2012).

Curiosity landed in the Gale Crater at 05:17 UTC on 6 August 2012. Upon reaching Mars, an automated precision landing sequence took over the entire landing events. A cable cutter separated the cruise stage from the aeroshell and then the cruise stage was diverted into a trajectory for burn-up in the atmosphere. Landing was confirmed simultaneously by 3 monitoring Mars orbiters. Curiosity landed on target and only 2.4 km (1.5 mi) from its center. The coordinates of the landing site (named "Bradbury Landing") are: 4.5895°S 137.4417°E.

Some low resolution Hazcam images were beamed to Earth by relay orbiters confirming the rover's wheels were deployed correctly and on the ground. Three hours later, the rover begins to beam detailed data on its systems' status as well as on its entry, descent and landing experience. Aerial 3D images of the landing site are available and include: the Curiosity rover and related Parachute (HiRISE, 10 October 2012).

On 8 August 2012, Mission Control began upgrading the rover's dual computers by deleting the entry-descent-landing software, then uploading and installing the surface operation software; the switchover was completed by 15 August.

=== Prime mission (2012 - September 2014) ===
Atmospheric values measured by the Curiosity rover at Gale Crater on Mars between August 2012 and February 2013.

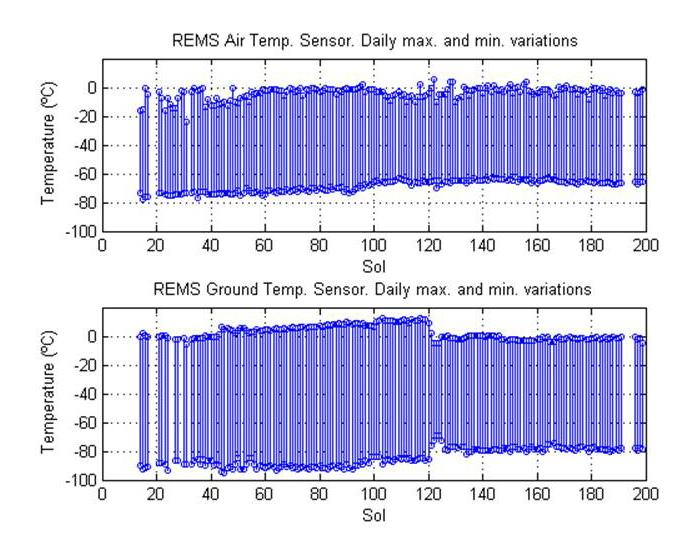
Temperature

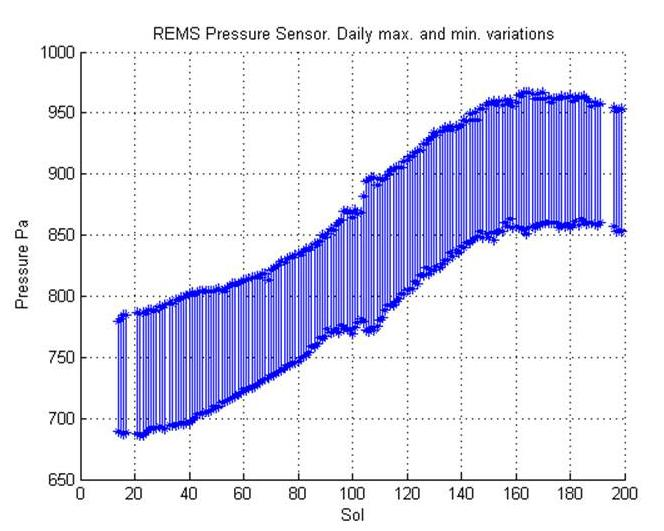
Pressure

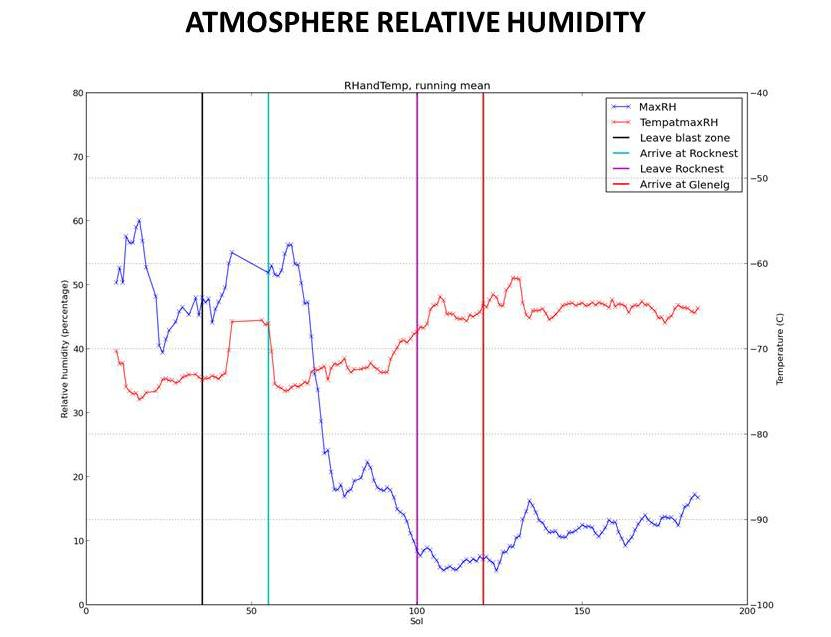
Humidity

On 15 August 2012, the rover began several days of instrument checks and mobility tests. The first laser testing of the ChemCam by Curiosity on Mars was performed on a rock, N165 ("Coronation" rock), near Bradbury Landing on 19 August 2012.

The science and operations teams have identified at least six possible routes to the base of Mount Sharp, and estimate about a year studying the rocks and soil of the crater floor while Curiosity slowly makes its way to the base of the mountain. The ChemCam team expects to take approximately one dozen compositional measurements of rocks per day.

Having completed its mobility tests, the rover's first drive began on 29 August 2012, to a place called Glenelg about 400 m (1,300 ft) to the east. Glenelg is a location where three types of terrain intersect, and is the mission's first major driving destination. The drive across may take up to two months, after which Curiosity will stay at Glenelg for a month.

On the way, Curiosity studied a pyramidal rock dubbed "Jake Matijevic" after a mathematician-turned-rover-engineer who played a critical role in the design of the six-wheeled rover, but died just days after Curiosity landed in August. The Jake rock measures about 25 cm (9.8 in) tall and 40 cm (16 in) wide. It is an igneous rock and may be a mugearite, a sodium rich oligoclase-bearing basaltic trachyandesite. Afterwards, on 30 September 2012, a finely-grained rock, named "Bathurst Inlet", was examined by Curiosity's Mars Hand Lens Imager (MAHLI) and Alpha particle X-ray spectrometer (APXS). The rock was named after Bathurst Inlet, a deep inlet located along the northern coast of the Canadian mainland. Also, a sand patch, named "Rocknest", is a test target for the first use of the scoop on the arm of the Curiosity rover.

==== Evidence for ancient water ====
Evidence of water on Mars

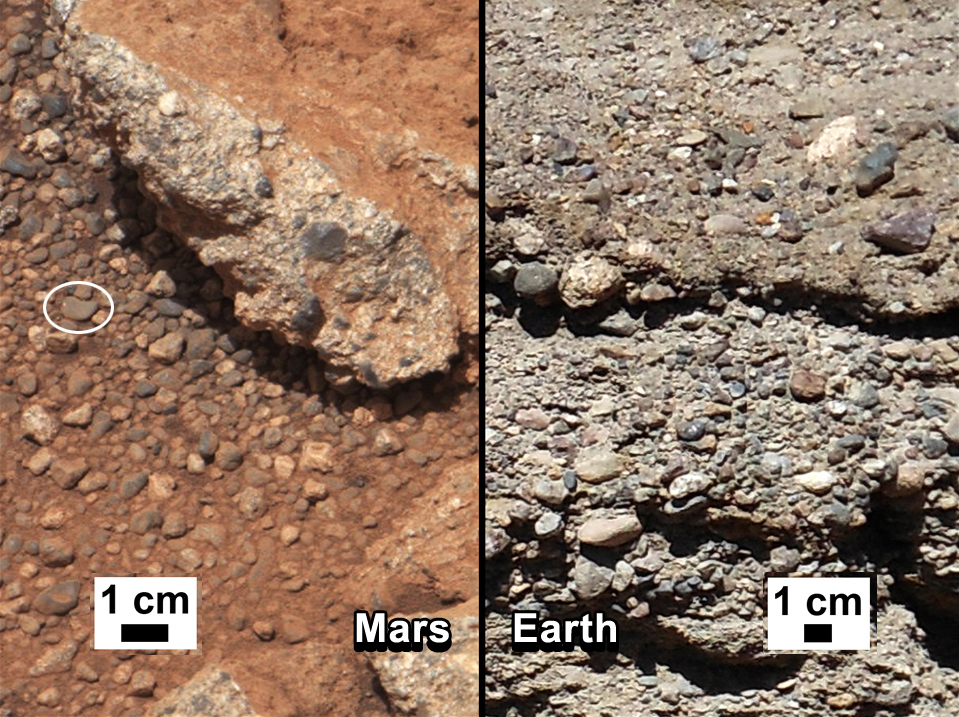
"Link" rock outcrop on Mars, which has been compared with a terrestrial fluvial conglomerate. It suggests water "vigorously" flowed in a stream.

On 27 September 2012, NASA scientists announced that the Curiosity rover found evidence for an ancient streambed suggesting a "vigorous flow" of water on Mars.

On 7 October 2012, a mysterious "bright object" (image), discovered in the sand at Rocknest, drew scientific interest. Several close-up pictures (close-up 1) (close-up 2) were taken of the object and preliminary interpretations by scientists suggest the object to be "debris from the spacecraft". Nonetheless, further images in the nearby sand have detected other "bright particles" (image) (close-up 1). These newly discovered objects are presently thought to be "native Martian material".

On 17 October 2012, at Rocknest, the first X-ray diffraction analysis of Martian soil was performed. The results revealed the presence of several minerals, including feldspar, pyroxenes and olivine, and suggested that the Martian soil in the sample was similar to the weathered basaltic soils of Hawaiian volcanoes. The sample used is composed of dust distributed from global dust storms and local fine sand. So far, the materials Curiosity has analyzed are consistent with the initial ideas of deposits in Gale Crater recording a transition through time from a wet to dry environment. On 22 November 2012, the Curiosity rover analyzed a rock named "Rocknest 3" with the APXS and then resumed traveling toward "Point Lake" overlook on its way to Glenelg Intrigue.

On 3 December 2012, NASA reported that Curiosity performed its first extensive soil analysis, revealing the presence of water molecules, sulfur and chlorine in the Martian soil. The presence of perchlorates in the sample seems highly likely. The presence of sulfate and sulfide is also likely because sulfur dioxide and hydrogen sulfide were detected. Small amounts of chloromethane, dichloromethane and trichloromethane were detected. The source of the carbon in these molecules is unclear. Possible sources include contamination of the instrument, organics in the sample and inorganic carbonates.

==== Evidence for ancient habitability ====
In February 2013, the rover used its drill for the first time.

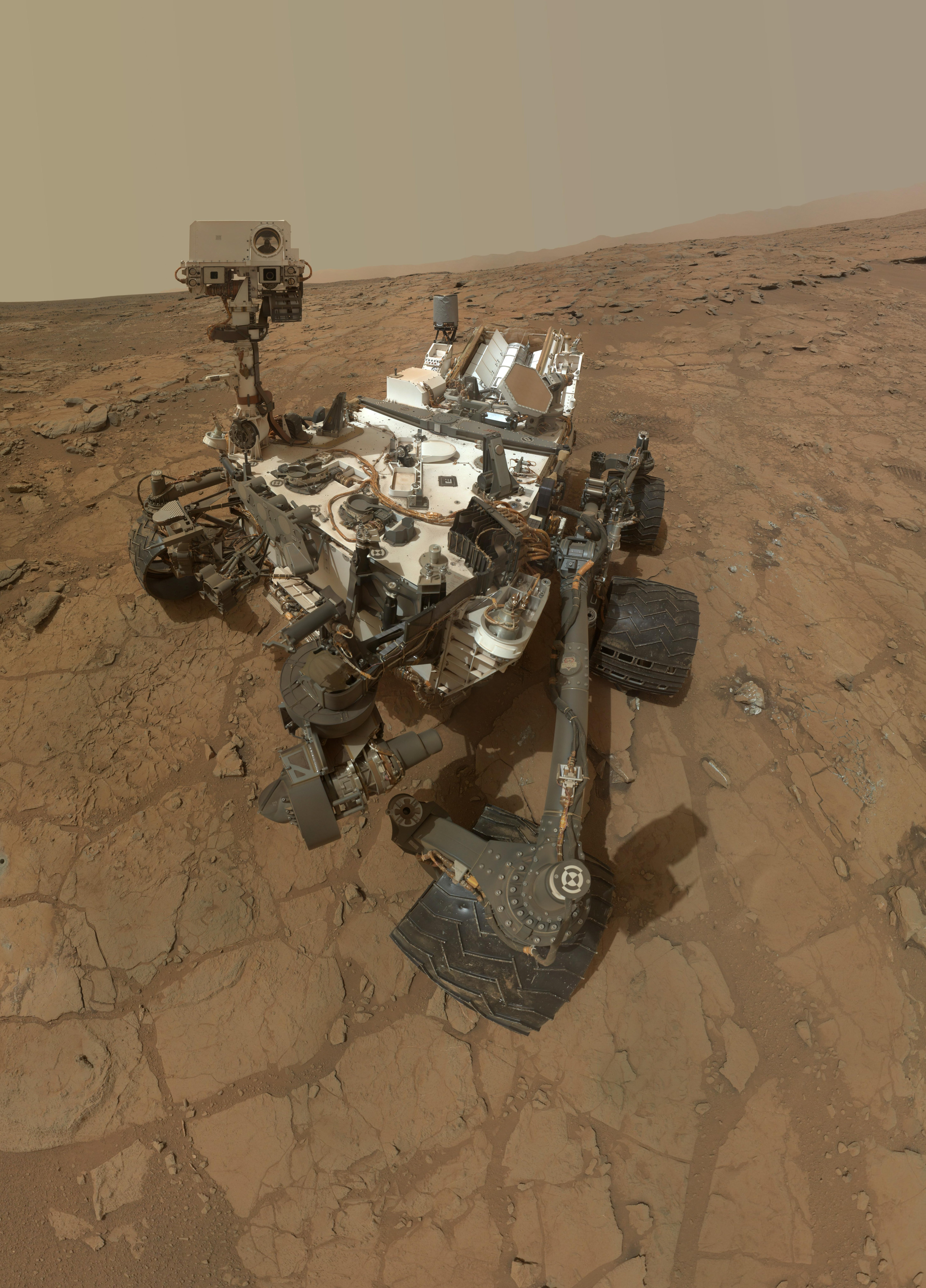
Curiosity at its first drilling site.

In March 2013, NASA reported Curiosity found evidence that geochemical conditions in Gale Crater were once suitable for microbial life after analyzing the first drilled sample of Martian rock, "John Klein" rock at Yellowknife Bay in Gale Crater. The rover detected water, carbon dioxide, oxygen, sulfur dioxide and hydrogen sulfide. Chloromethane and dichloromethane were also detected. Related tests found results consistent with the presence of smectite clay minerals. In addition, sandstone beds associated with the Gillespie Lake Member of Yellowknife Bay seem similar to microbially induced sedimentary structures (MISS) found on Earth, according to one study.

==== Evidence for atmospheric loss ====
On 8 April 2013, NASA reported that much of the atmosphere of Mars has been lost based on argon isotope ratios studies.

On 19 July 2013, NASA scientists published the results of a new analysis of the atmosphere of Mars, reporting a lack of methane around the landing site of the Curiosity rover. In addition, the scientists found evidence that Mars "has lost a good deal of its atmosphere over time", based on the abundance of isotopic compositions of gases, particularly those related to argon and carbon.

==== Other 2013 events ====
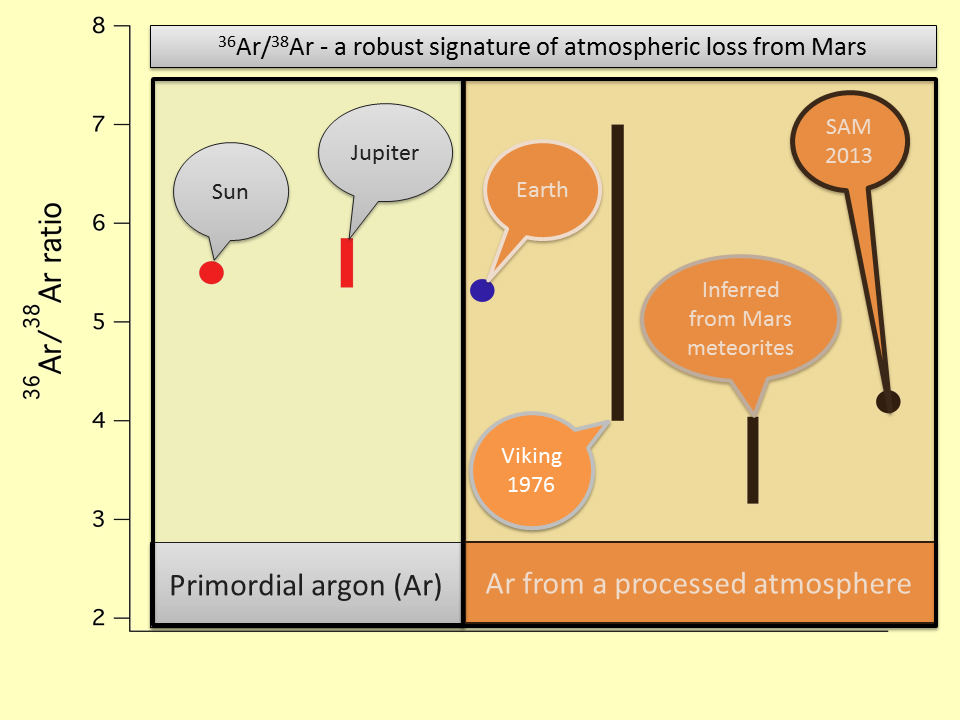
Argon isotope ratios are used to estimate atmospheric loss on Mars. (Curiosity rover, April, 2013)

On 28 February 2013, NASA was forced to switch to the backup computer due to an issue with the then active computer's flash memory which resulted in the computer continuously rebooting in a loop. The backup computer was turned on in safe mode and was converted to operational status on 19 March 2013.

On 18 March 2013, NASA reported evidence of mineral hydration, likely hydrated calcium sulfate, in several rock samples including the broken fragments of "Tintina" rock and "Sutton Inlier" rock as well as in veins and nodules in other rocks like "Knorr" rock and "Wernicke" rock. Analysis using the rover's DAN instrument provided evidence of subsurface water, amounting to as much as 4% water content, down to a depth of 60 cm (2.0 ft), in the rover's traverse from the Bradbury Landing site to the Yellowknife Bay area in the Glenelg terrain.

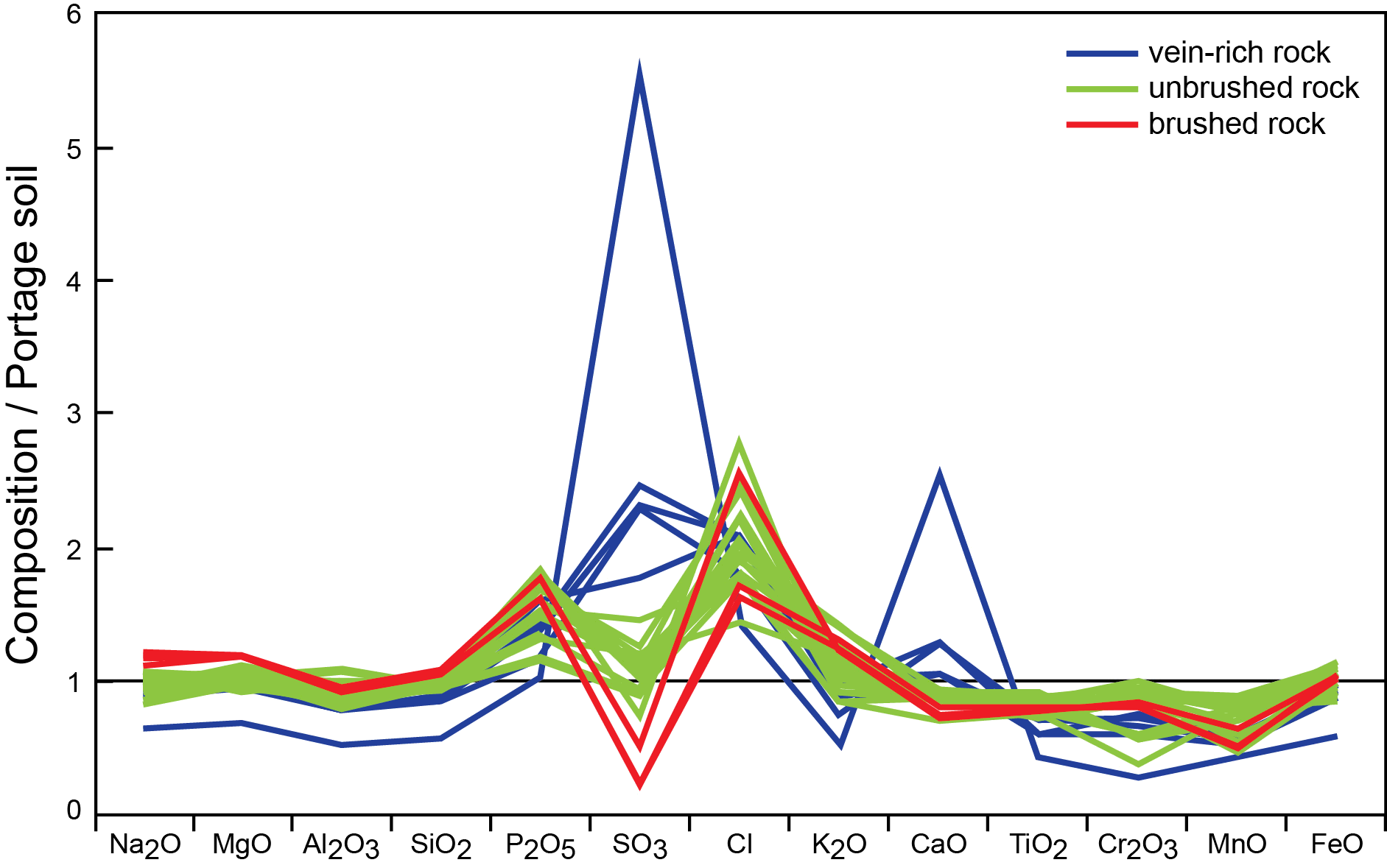
Composition of "Yellowknife Bay" rocks - rock veins are higher in calcium and sulfur than "Portage" soil - APXS results - Curiosity rover (March, 2013).

Between 4 April – 1 May 2013, Curiosity operated autonomously due to a Martian solar conjunction with Earth. While Curiosity transmitted a beep to Earth each day and the Odyssey spacecraft continued to relay information from the rover, no commands were sent from mission control since there was a possibility of data corruption due to interference from the Sun. Curiosity continued to perform stationary science at Yellowknife Bay for the duration of the conjunction.

On 5 June 2013, NASA announced that Curiosity will soon begin a 8 km (5.0 mi) journey from the Glenelg area to the base of Mount Sharp. The trip is expected to take nine months to a year with stops along the way to study the local terrain.

On 16 July 2013, the Curiosity rover reached a milestone in its journey across Mars, having traveled 1 km (0.62 mi), since its landing in 2012; on 1 August 2013, the rover traveled over one mile: 1.686 km (1.048 mi).

On 6 August 2013, NASA celebrated Curiosity's first year on Mars (6 August 2012 to 5 August 2013) by programming the rover to perform the "Happy Birthday" song to itself. NASA also released several videos (video-1, video-2) summarizing the rover's accomplishments over the year. Primarily, the mission found evidence of "ancient environments suitable for life" on Mars. The rover drove over one-mile across the Martian terrain, transmitted more than 190 gigabits of data to Earth, including 70,000 images (36,700 full images and 35,000 thumbnails), and the rover's laser fired more than 75,000 times at 2,000 targets.

On 27 August 2013, Curiosity used autonomous navigation (or "autonav"- the ability of the rover to decide for itself how to drive safely) over unknown Martian ground for the first time.

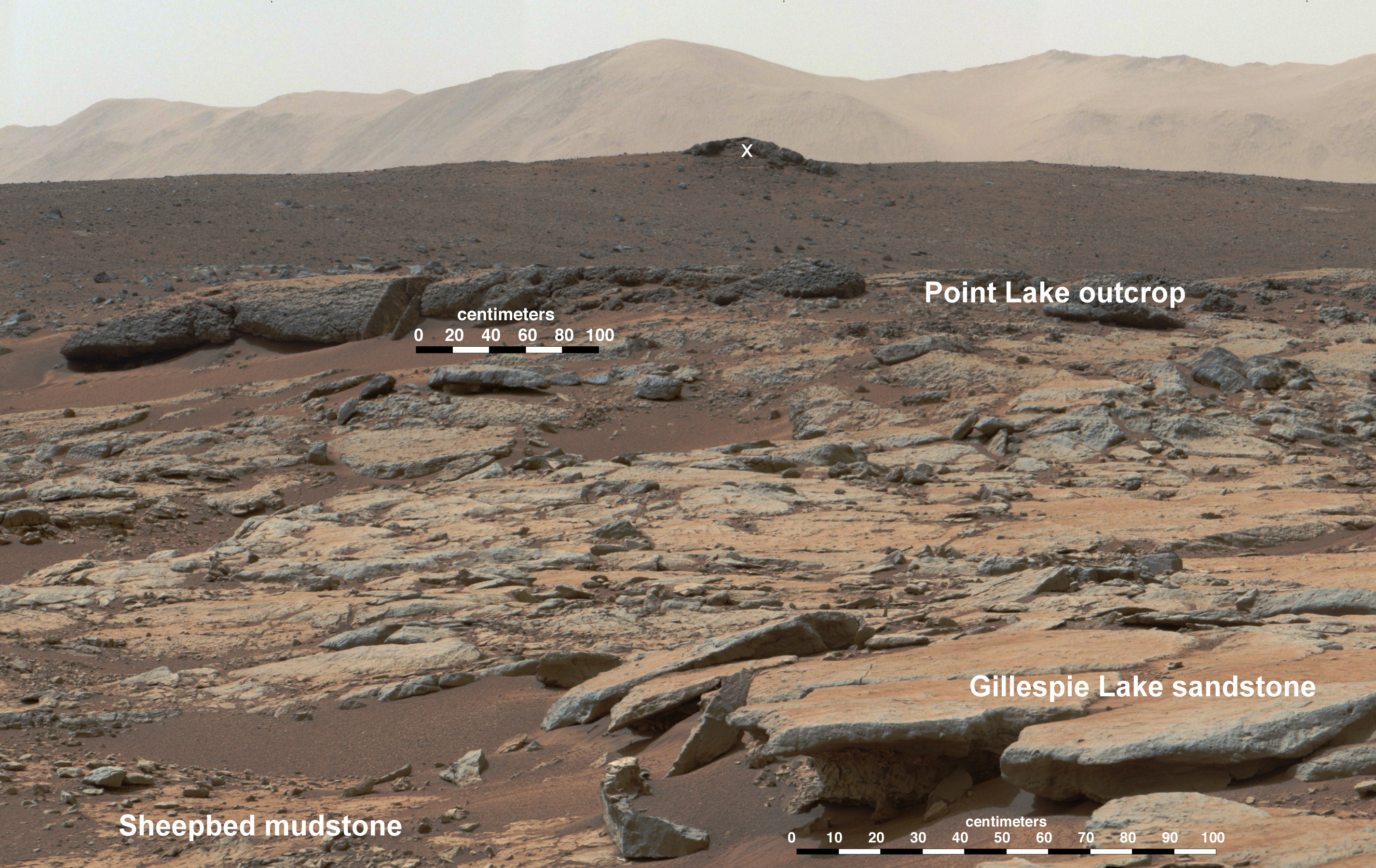
Curiosity rover - view of "Sheepbed" mudstone (lower left) and surroundings (February 14, 2013).

On 19 September 2013, NASA scientists, on the basis of further measurements by Curiosity, reported no detection of atmospheric methane with a measured value of 0.18±0.67 ppbv corresponding to an upper limit of only 1.3 ppbv (95% confidence limit) and, as a result, conclude that the probability of current methanogenic microbial activity on Mars is reduced.

On 26 September 2013, NASA scientists reported the Mars Curiosity rover detected "abundant, easily accessible" water (1.5 to 3 weight percent) in soil samples at the Rocknest region of Aeolis Palus in Gale Crater. In addition, NASA reported that the Curiosity rover found two principal soil types: a fine-grained mafic type and a locally derived, coarse-grained felsic type. The mafic type, similar to other Martian soils and Martian dust, was associated with hydration of the amorphous phases of the soil. Also, perchlorates, the presence of which may make detection of life-related organic molecules difficult, were found at the Curiosity rover landing site (and earlier at the more polar site of the Phoenix lander) suggesting a "global distribution of these salts". NASA also reported that Jake M rock, a rock encountered by Curiosity on the way to Glenelg, was a mugearite and very similar to terrestrial mugearite rocks.

On 17 October 2013, NASA reported, based on analysis of argon in the Martian atmosphere, that certain meteorites found on Earth thought to be from Mars are confirmed to be from Mars.

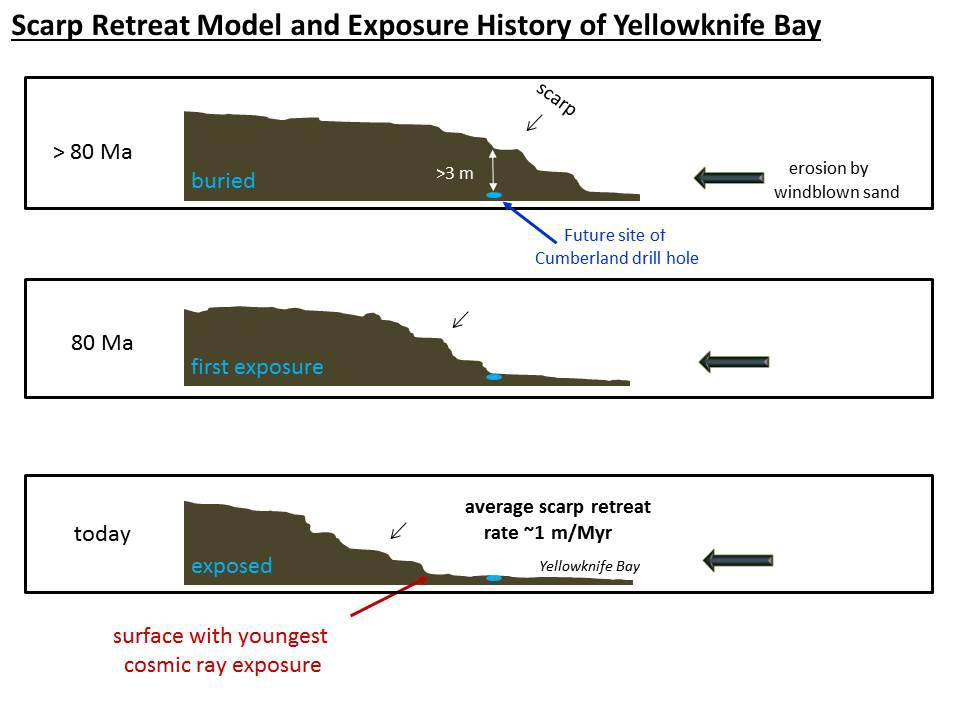
Scarp retreat by windblown sand over time on Mars (Yellowknife Bay, December 9, 2013).

On 13 November 2013, NASA announced the names of two features on Mars important to two active Mars exploration rovers in honor of planetary scientist Bruce C. Murray (1931-2013): "Murray Buttes", an entryway the Curiosity rover will traverse on its way to Mount Sharp and "Murray Ridge", an uplifted crater that the Opportunity rover is exploring.

On 25 November 2013, NASA reported that Curiosity has resumed full science operations, with no apparent loss of capability, after completing the diagnosis of an electrical problem first observed on 17 November. Apparently, an internal short in the rover's power source, the Multi-Mission Radioisotope Thermoelectric Generator, caused an unusual and intermittent decrease in a voltage indicator on the rover.

On 27 November 2013, an overview (titled, "The World of Mars") of current and proposed Mars exploration by John Grotzinger, chief scientist of the Curiosity rover mission, was published in the New York Times.

On 9 December 2013, NASA reported that the planet Mars had a large freshwater lake (which could have been a hospitable environment for microbial life) based on evidence from the Curiosity rover studying Aeolis Palus near Mount Sharp in Gale Crater.

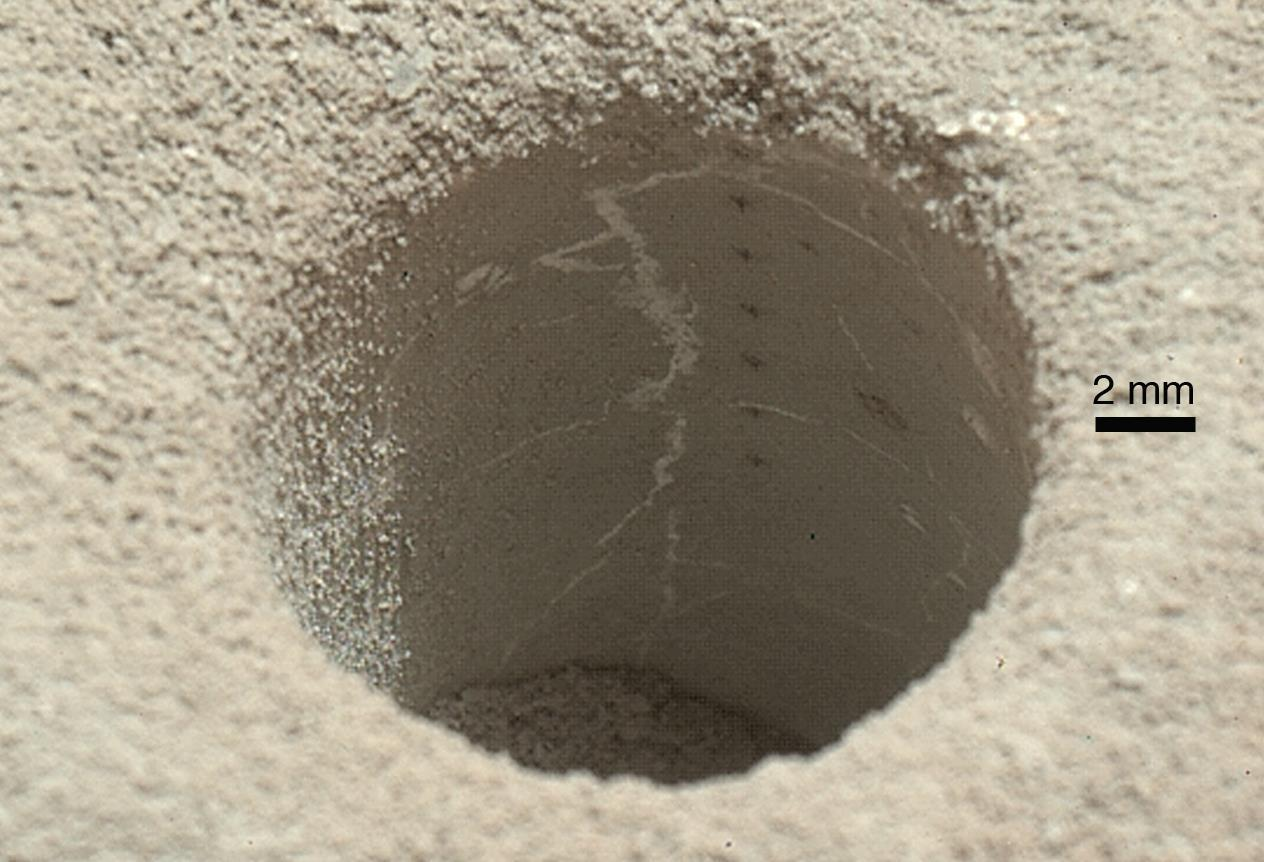
Hole (1.6 cm (0.63 in)) drilled into "John Klein" mudstone.

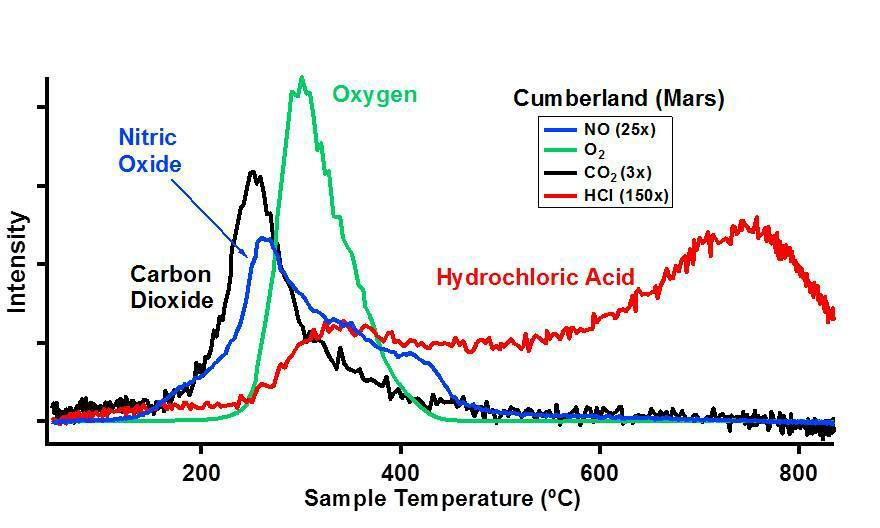
Spectral Analysis (SAM) of "Cumberland" mudstone.

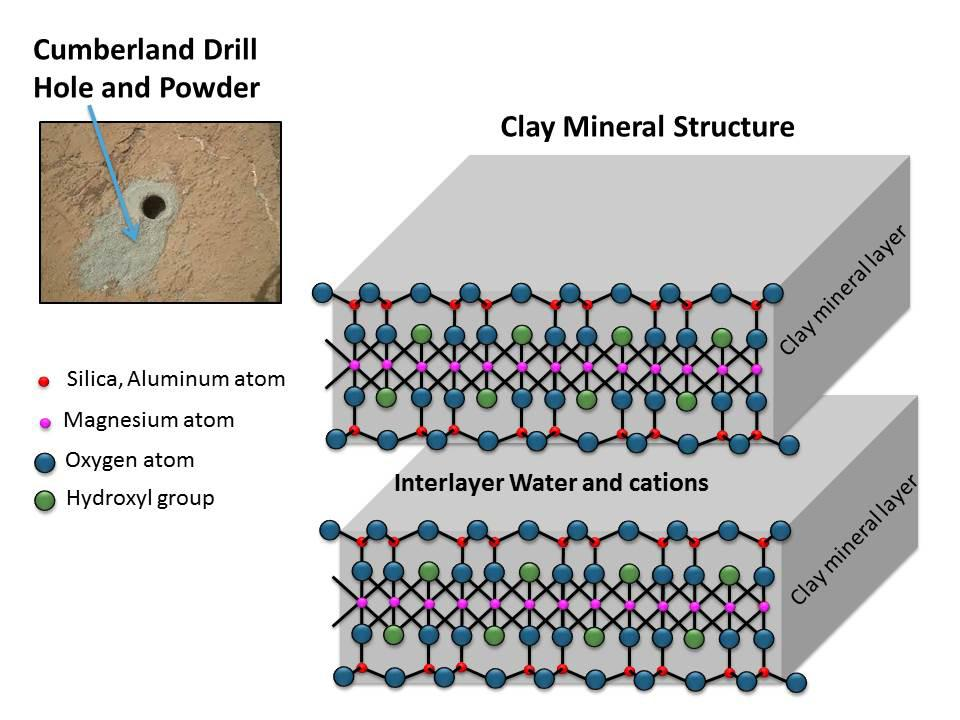
Clay mineral structure of mudstone.

The Curiosity rover examines mudstone near Yellowknife Bay on Mars (May 2013).

On 9 December 2013, NASA researchers described, in a series of six articles in the journal Science, many new discoveries from the Curiosity rover. Possible organics were found that could not be explained by contamination. Although the organic carbon was probably from Mars, it can all be explained by dust and meteorites that have landed on the planet. Because much of the carbon was released at a relatively low temperature in Curiosity's Sample Analysis at Mars (SAM) instrument package, it probably did not come from carbonates in the sample. The carbon could be from organisms, but this has not been proven. This organic-bearing material was obtained by drilling 5 centimeters deep in a site called Yellowknife Bay into a rock called "Sheepbed mudstone". The samples were named John Klein and Cumberland. Microbes could be living on Mars by obtaining energy from chemical imbalances between minerals in a process called chemolithotrophy which means "eating rock." However, in this process only a very tiny amount of carbon is involved — much less than was found at Yellowknife Bay.

Using SAM's mass spectrometer, scientists measured isotopes of helium, neon, and argon that cosmic rays produce as they go through rock. The fewer of these isotopes they find, the more recently the rock has been exposed near the surface. The 4-billion-year-old lakebed rock drilled by Curiosity was uncovered between 30 million and 110 million years ago by winds which sandblasted away 2 meters of overlying rock. Next, they hope to find a site tens of millions of years younger by drilling close to an overhanging outcrop.

The absorbed dose and dose equivalent from galactic cosmic rays and solar energetic particles on the Martian surface for ~300 days of observations during the current solar maximum was measured. These measurements are necessary for human missions to the surface of Mars, to provide microbial survival times of any possible extant or past life, and to determine how long potential organic biosignatures can be preserved. This study estimates that a 1-meter depth drill is necessary to access possible viable radioresistant microbe cells. The actual absorbed dose measured by the Radiation Assessment Detector (RAD) is 76 mGy/yr at the surface. Based on these measurements, for a round-trip Mars surface mission with 180 days (each way) cruise, and 500 days on the Martian surface for this current solar cycle, an astronaut would be exposed to a total mission dose equivalent of ~1.01 sievert. Exposure to 1 sievert is associated with a 5 percent increase in risk for developing fatal cancer. NASA's current lifetime limit for increased risk for its astronauts operating in low-Earth orbit is 3 percent. Maximum shielding from galactic cosmic rays can be obtained with about 3 meters of Martian soil.

The samples examined were probably once mud that for millions to tens of millions of years could have hosted living organisms. This wet environment had neutral pH, low salinity, and variable redox states of both iron and sulfur species. These types of iron and sulfur could have been used by living organisms. C, H, O, S, N, and P were measured directly as key biogenic elements, and by inference, P is assumed to have been there as well. The two samples, John Klein and Cumberland, contain basaltic minerals, Ca-sulfates, Fe oxide/hydroxides, Fe-sulfides, amorphous material, and trioctahedral smectites (a type of clay). Basaltic minerals in the mudstone are similar to those in nearby aeolian deposits. However, the mudstone has far less Fe-forsterite plus magnetite, so Fe-forsterite (type of olivine) was probably altered to form smectite (a type of clay) and magnetite. A Late Noachian/Early Hesperian or younger age indicates that clay mineral formation on Mars extended beyond Noachian time; therefore, in this location neutral pH lasted longer than previously thought.

On 20 December 2013, NASA reported that Curiosity has successfully upgraded, for the third time since landing, its software programs and is now operating with version 11. The new software is expected to provide the rover with better robotic arm and autonomous driving abilities. Due to wheel wear, a concern to drive more carefully over the rough terrain the rover is currently traveling on to Mount Sharp, was also reported.

==== Search for ancient life ====
On 24 January 2014, NASA reported that current studies by the Curiosity and Opportunity rovers will now be searching for evidence of ancient life, including a biosphere based on autotrophic, chemotrophic and/or chemolithoautotrophic microorganisms, as well as ancient water, including fluvio-lacustrine environments (plains related to ancient rivers or lakes) that may have been habitable. The search for evidence of habitability, taphonomy (related to fossils), and organic carbon on the planet Mars is now a primary NASA objective.

==== Arrival at Mount Sharp ====
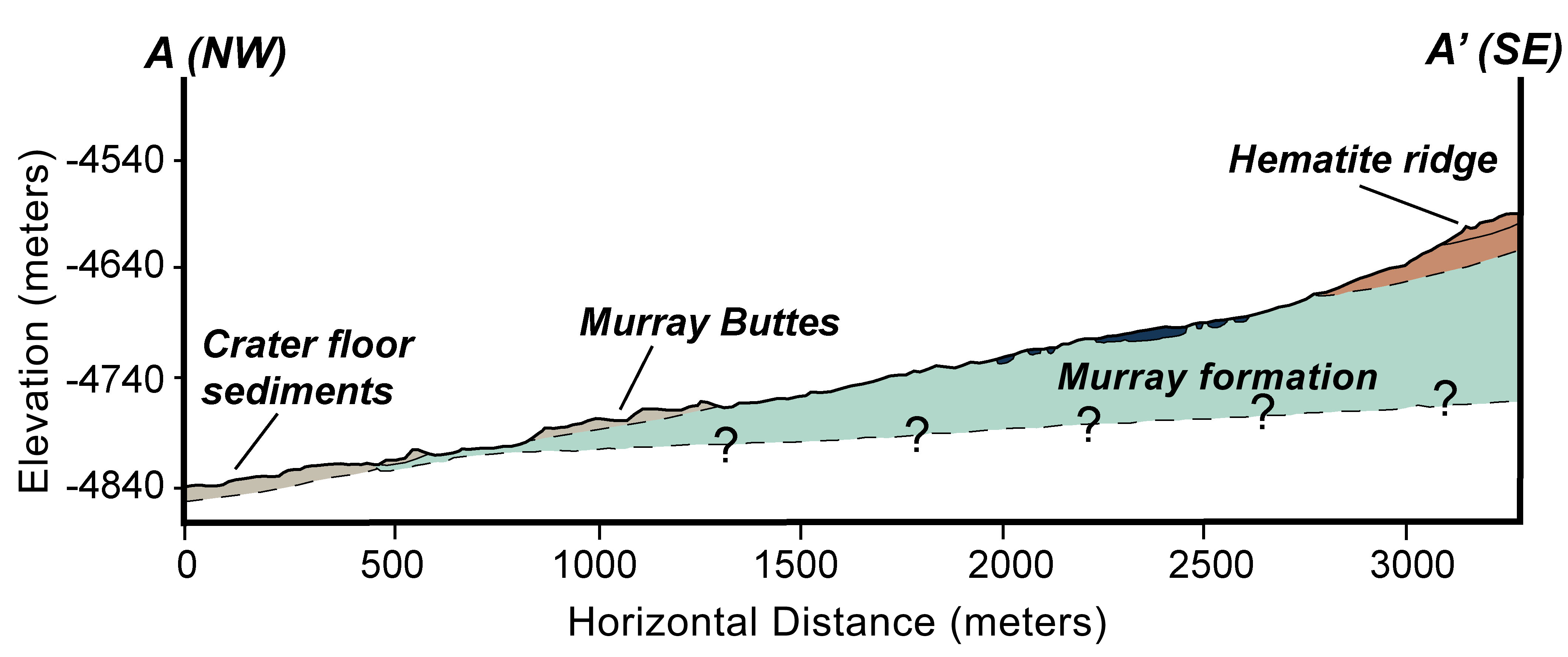
Geology map - from the crater floor in Aeolis Palus up the Slopes of Mount Sharp
(11 September 2014).

On 11 September 2014 (Sol 746), Curiosity reached the slopes of Aeolis Mons (or Mount Sharp), the rover mission's long-term prime destination and where the rover is expected to learn more about the history of Mars. Curiosity had traveled an estimated linear distance of 6.9 km (4.3 mi) to the mountain slopes since leaving its "start" point in Yellowknife Bay on 4 July 2013.

==== Detection of organics ====
On 16 December 2014, NASA reported the Curiosity rover detected a "tenfold spike", likely localized, in the amount of methane in the Martian atmosphere. Sample measurements taken "a dozen times over 20 months" showed increases in late 2013 and early 2014, averaging "7 parts of methane per billion in the atmosphere." Before and after that, readings averaged around one-tenth that level. In addition, high levels of organic chemicals, particularly chlorobenzene, were detected in powder drilled from one of the rocks, named "Cumberland", analyzed by the Curiosity rover.

==== Other 2014 events ====
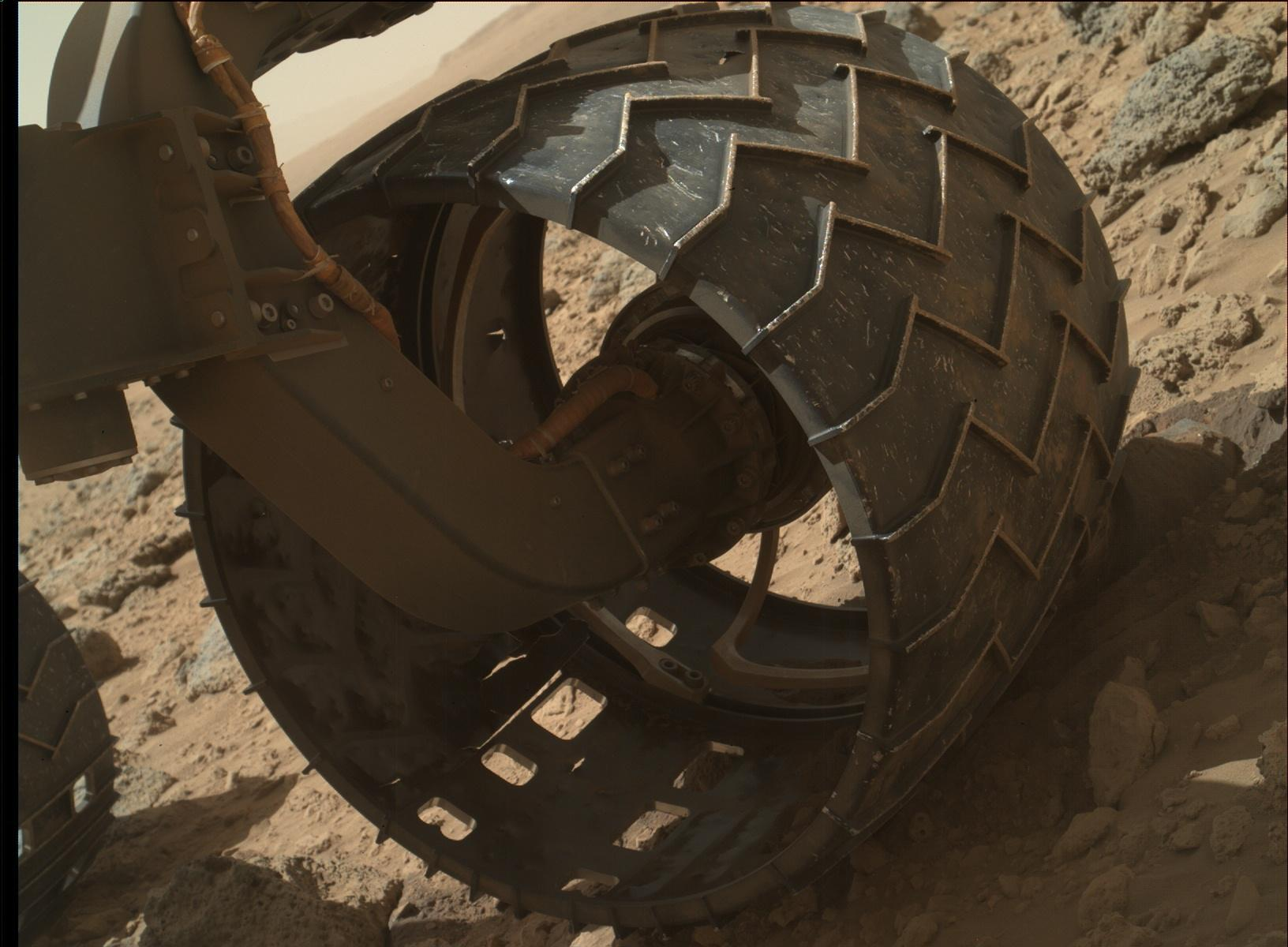
NOV-2013 - Curiosity's wheel - dents and holes - 3 miles on Mars (30 November 2013).

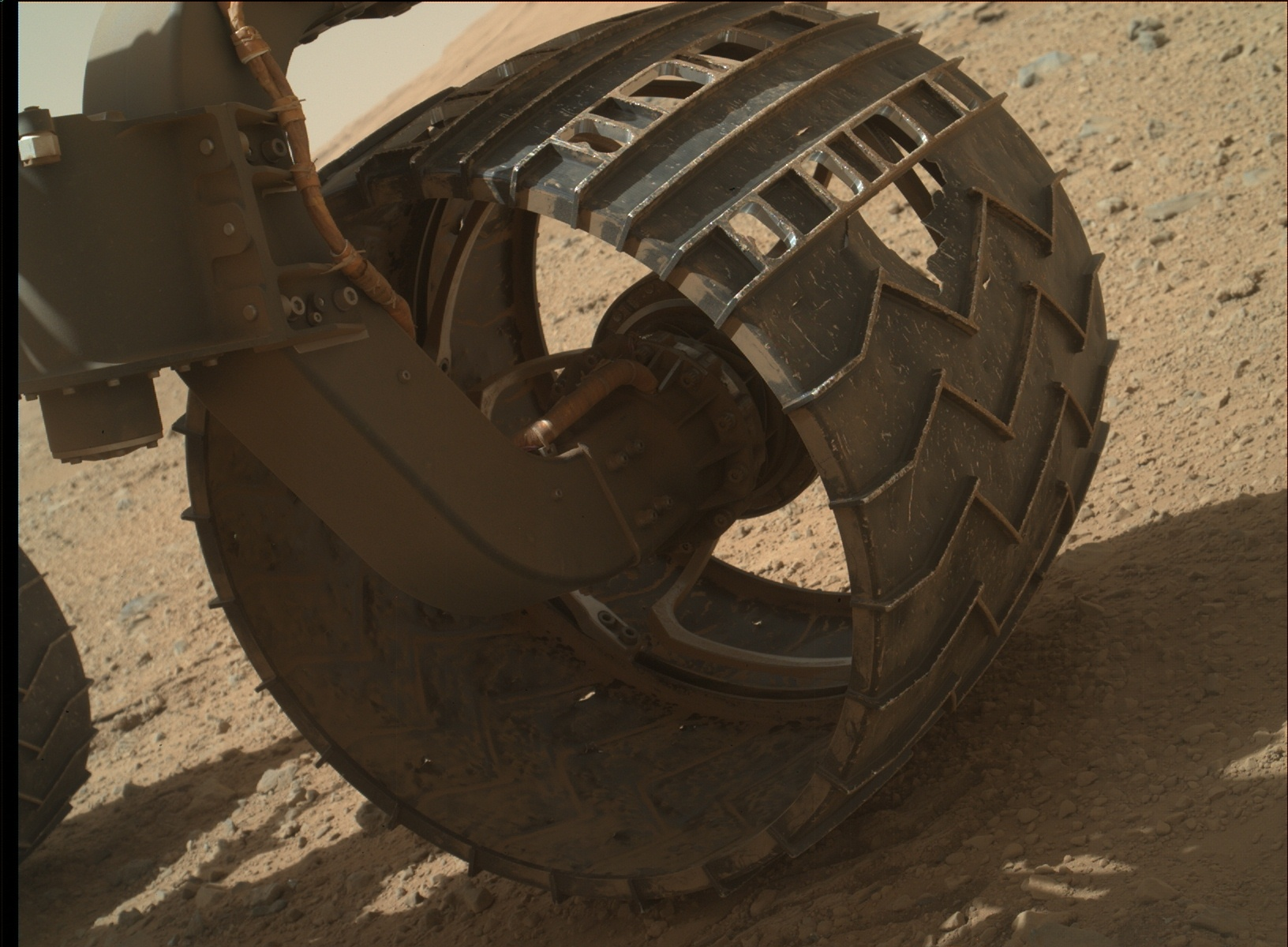
FEB-2014 - Curiosity's wheel - dents and holes - 3 miles on Mars (18 February 2014).

On 6 February 2014, the Curiosity rover, in order to reduce wear on its wheels by avoiding rougher terrain, successfully crossed (image) the "Dingo Gap" sand dune and is now expected to travel a smoother route to Mount Sharp.

On 19 May 2014, scientists announced that numerous microbes, like Tersicoccus phoenicis, may be resistant to methods usually used in spacecraft assembly clean rooms. It's not currently known if such resistant microbes could have withstood space travel and are present on the Curiosity rover now on Mars.

On 25 May 2014, Curiosity discovered an iron meteorite, and named it "Lebanon" (image).

On 3 June 2014, Curiosity observed the planet Mercury transiting the Sun, marking the first time a planetary transit has been observed from a celestial body besides Earth.

On 24 June 2014, Curiosity completed a Martian year—687 Earth days—after finding that Mars once had environmental conditions favorable for microbial life.

On 27 June 2014, Curiosity crossed the boundary line of its "3-sigma safe-to-land ellipse" and is now in territory that may get even more interesting, especially in terms of Martian geology and landscape (view from space).

On 12 July 2014, Curiosity imaged the first laser spark on Mars (related image; video (01:07).)

On 6 August 2014, Curiosity celebrated its second anniversary since landing on Mars in 2012.

On 11 September 2014, a panel of NASA scientists announced (video (01:25)) the arrival of Curiosity at Mount Sharp and discussed future rover plans.

=== First extended mission (October 2014 - September 2016) ===
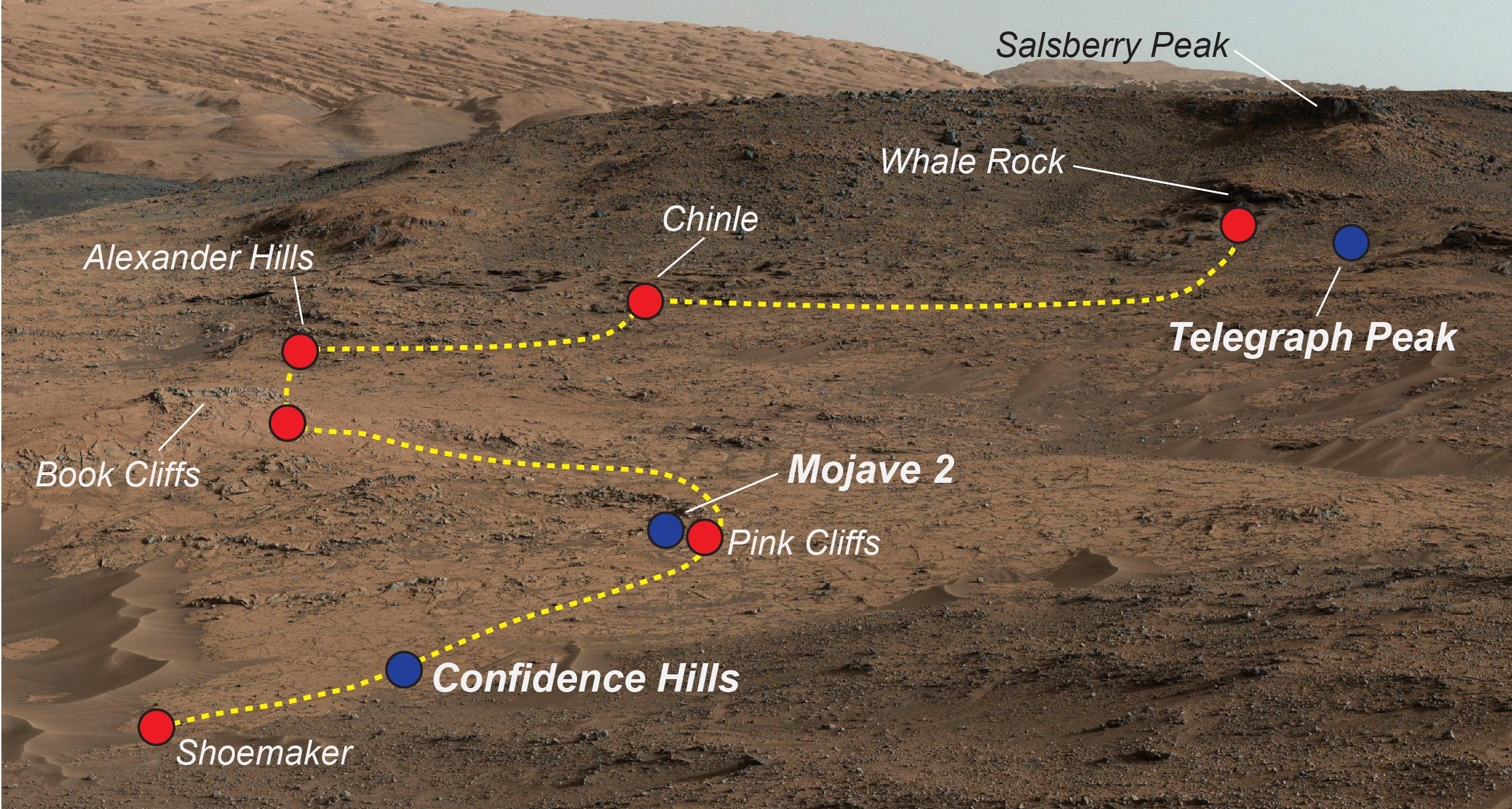
Pahrump Hills as viewed by the Curiosity rover (2014).

On 19 October 2014, the Curiosity rover viewed the flyby of Comet C/2013 A1.

On 8 December 2014, a panel of NASA scientists discussed (archive 62:03) the latest observations of Curiosity, including findings about how water may have helped shape the landscape of Mars and had a climate long ago that could have produced long-lasting lakes at many Martian locations.

On 16 December 2014, NASA reported detecting an unusual increase, then decrease, in the amounts of methane in the atmosphere of the planet Mars; in addition, organic chemicals were detected in powder drilled from a rock by the Curiosity rover. Also, based on deuterium to hydrogen ratio studies, much of the water at Gale Crater on Mars was found to have been lost during ancient times, before the lakebed in the crater was formed; afterwards, large amounts of water continued to be lost.

On 21 January 2015, NASA announced a collaborative effort with Microsoft that developed a software project called OnSight which allows scientists to perform virtual work on Mars based on data from the Curiosity rover.

On 6 March 2015, NASA reported performing tests on the rover to help uncover the reason for intermittent problems with the robotic arm used for rock drilling and analysis. Results of preliminary tests suggest the intermittent short-circuit problem may be related to the percussion mechanism of the drill. Further tests are planned to verify and adjust to the problem.

On 24 March 2015, NASA reported the first detection of nitrogen released after heating surface sediments on the planet Mars. The nitrogen, in the form of nitric oxide, was detected by the SAM instrument on the Curiosity rover and can be used by living organisms. The discovery supports the notion that ancient Mars may have been habitable for life.

On 27 March 2015, NASA reported that the Bradbury Landing, the mission's landing site, was fading from view in the two-and-a-half years since landing in 2012.

On 4 April 2015, NASA reported studies, based on measurements by the Sample Analysis at Mars (SAM) instrument on the Curiosity rover, of the Martian atmosphere using xenon and argon isotopes. Results provided support for a "vigorous" loss of atmosphere early in the history of Mars and were consistent with an atmospheric signature found in bits of atmosphere captured in some Martian meteorites found on Earth.

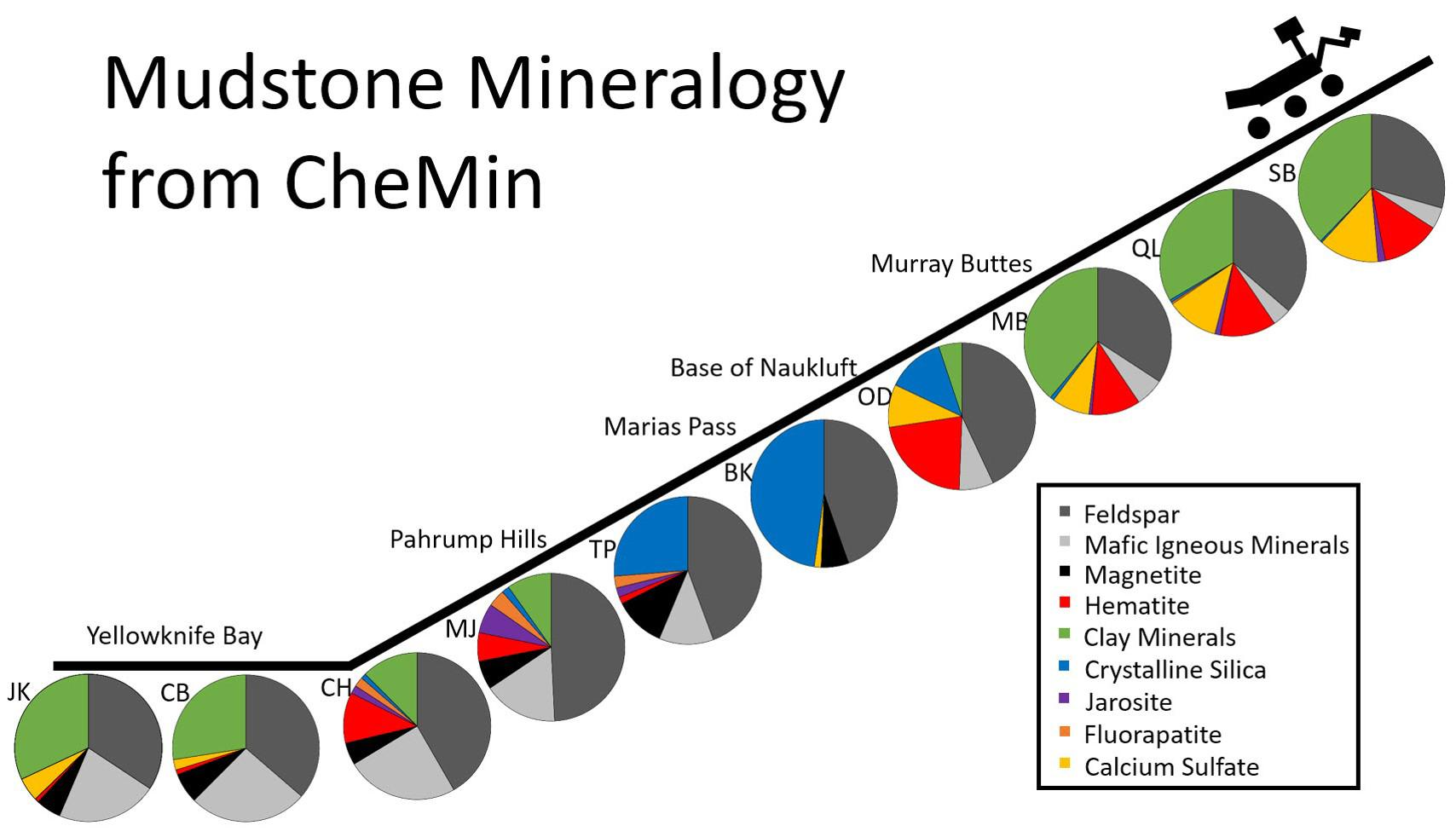
Curiosity rover - Mudstone Mineralogy - 2013 to 2016 on Mars (CheMin; December 13, 2016)

On 19 August 2015, NASA scientists reported that the Dynamic Albedo of Neutrons (DAN) instrument on the Curiosity rover detected an unusual hydrogen-rich area, at "Marias Pass," on Mars. The hydrogen found seemed related to water or hydroxyl ions in rocks within three feet beneath the rover, according to the scientists.

On 5 October 2015, possible recurrent slope lineae, wet brine flows, were reported on Mount Sharp near Curiosity. In addition, on 5 October 2015, NASA reported an estimated 20,000 to 40,000 heat-resistant bacterial spores were on Curiosity at launch, as much as 1,000 times more than that may not have been counted.

On 8 October 2015, NASA confirmed that lakes and streams existed in Gale crater 3.3 - 3.8 billion years ago delivering sediments to build up the lower layers of Mount Sharp.

On 17 December 2015, NASA reported that as Curiosity climbed higher up Mount Sharp, the composition of rocks were changing substantially. For example, rocks found higher up the mountain contained much higher levels of silica than the basaltic rocks found earlier. After further analysis, the silica-rich rocks on Mars were found to be tridymite, a mineral that is not commonly found on Earth. Opal-A, another form of silica, was also found on Mars.

=== Second extended mission (October 2016 - September 2019) ===
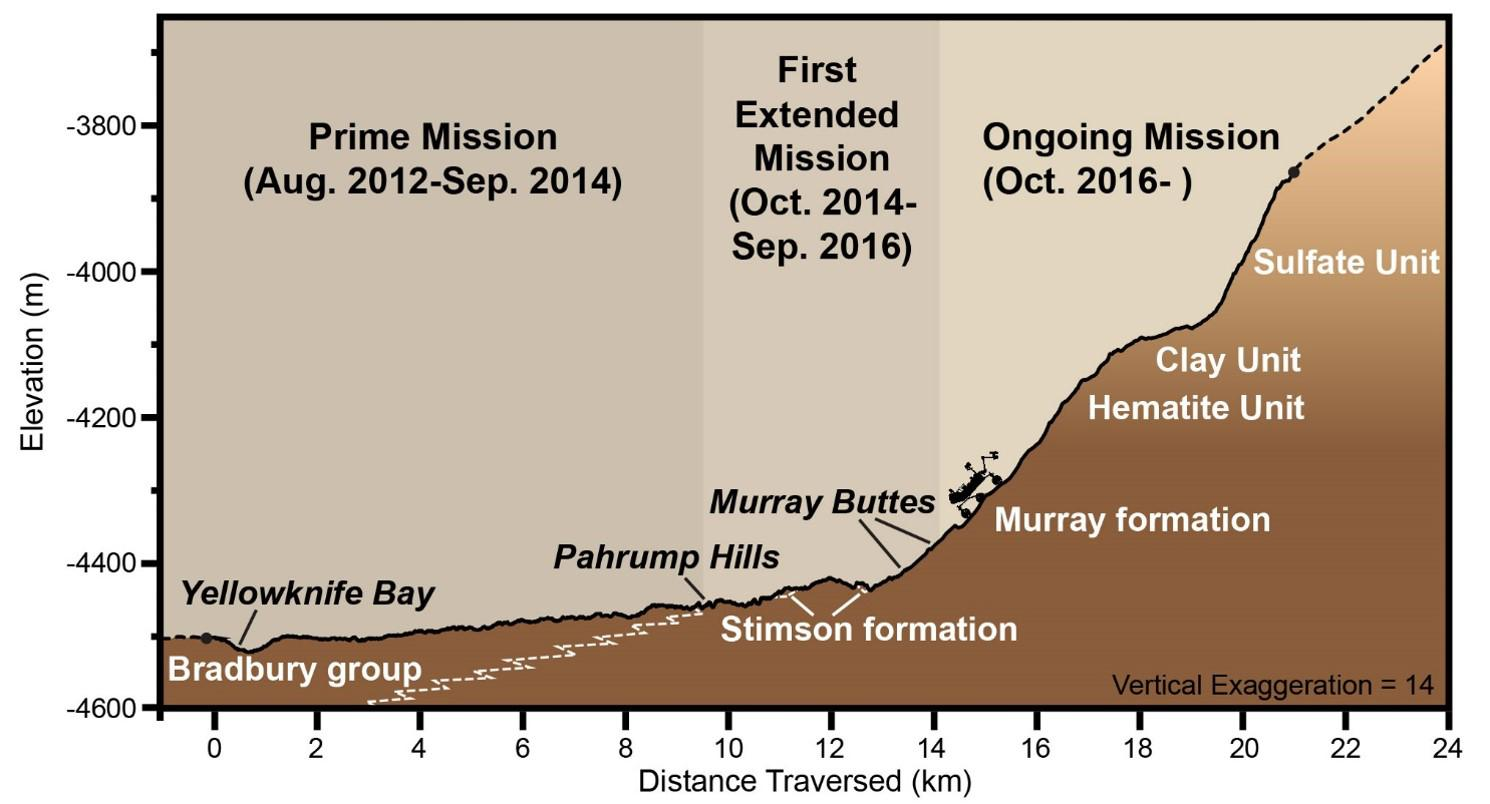
Summary of the Curiosity rover mission (14-fold exaggerated elevation; 13 December 2016)

The second extended mission began on 1 October 2016. The rover explored a ridge known as the Murray Formation for most of the mission.

As of 3 October 2016, NASA summarized the findings of the mission, thus far, as follows: "The Curiosity mission has already achieved its main goal of determining whether the landing region ever offered environmental conditions that would have been favorable for microbial life, if Mars has ever hosted life. The mission found evidence of ancient rivers and lakes, with a chemical energy source and all of the chemical ingredients necessary for life as we know it." Plans for the next two years, up to September 2018, include further explorations of the uphill slopes of Mount Sharp, including a ridge rich in the mineral hematite and a region of clay-rich bedrock.

On 13 December 2016, NASA reported further evidence supporting habitability on Mars as the Curiosity rover climbed higher, studying younger layers, on Mount Sharp. Also reported, the very soluble element boron was detected for the first time on Mars. Since landing on Mars in August 2012, Curiosity has driven 15.0 km (9.3 mi) and climbed 165 m (541 ft) in elevation.

On 17 January 2017, NASA released an image of a rock slab, named "Old Soaker", which may contain mud cracks. Also, somewhat later, it released an animation of sand moving in a nearby area.

On 6 February 2017, NASA reported that rock samples analyzed by the rover have not revealed any significant carbonate. This poses a puzzle to researchers: the same rocks that indicate a lake existed also indicate there was very little carbon dioxide in the air to help keep the lake unfrozen.

On 27 February 2017, NASA presented the following mission overview: "During the first year after Curiosity's 2012 landing in Gale Crater, the mission fulfilled its main goal by finding that the region once offered environmental conditions favorable for microbial life. The conditions in long-lived ancient freshwater Martian lake environments included all of the key chemical elements needed for life as we know it, plus a chemical source of energy that is used by many microbes on Earth. The extended mission is investigating how and when the habitable ancient conditions evolved into conditions drier and less favorable for life."

From 3 to 7 May 2017, Curiosity used ChemCam to study what turned out to be manganese oxide deposits on the Sutton Island and Blunts Point layers of the Murray Formation. According to a 2024 paper, the deposits suggest Earth-level amounts of oxygen were present in the very early Martian atmosphere, hinting at microbial life.

On 1 June 2017, NASA reported that the Curiosity rover provided evidence of an ancient lake in Gale crater on Mars that could have been favorable for microbial life; the ancient lake was stratified, with shallows rich in oxidants and depths poor in oxidants, particularly silica; the ancient lake provided many different types of microbe-friendly environments at the same time. NASA further reported that the Curiosity rover will continue to explore higher and younger layers of Mount Sharp in order to determine how the lake environment in ancient times on Mars became the drier environment in more modern times.

Between 22 July – 1 August 2017, few commands were sent from the Earth to Mars since Mars was in conjunction with the sun.

On 5 August 2017, NASA celebrated the fifth anniversary of the Curiosity rover mission landing, and related exploratory accomplishments, on the planet Mars. (Videos: Curiosity's First Five Years (02:07); Curiosity's POV: Five Years Driving (05:49); Curiosity's Discoveries About Gale Crater (02:54))

On 5 September 2017, scientists reported that the Curiosity rover detected boron, an essential ingredient for life on Earth, on the planet Mars. Such a finding, along with previous discoveries that water may have been present on ancient Mars, further supports the possible early habitability of Gale Crater on Mars.

On 13 September 2017, NASA reported that the Curiosity rover climbed an iron-oxide-bearing ridge called Vera Rubin Ridge (or Hematite Ridge) and will now start studying the numerous bright veins embedded in the various layers of the ridge, in order to provide more details about the history and habitability of ancient Mars.

On 30 September 2017, NASA reported radiation levels on the surface of the planet Mars were temporarily doubled, and were associated with an aurora 25-times brighter than any observed earlier, due to a massive, and unexpected, solar storm in the middle of the month.

On 17 October 2017, NASA announced the testing of its systems on Curiosity in an attempt to better resume drilling. The drilling system had stopped working reliably in December 2016.

On 2 January 2018, Curiosity captured images of rock shapes that may require further study in order to help better determine whether the shapes are biological or geological.

On 22 March 2018, Curiosity had spent 2000 sols (2054 days) on Mars, and prepares to study a region of clay-bearing rocks.

In June 2018, a local dust storm occurred near the Opportunity rover which may affect Curiosity. The first signs of the storm, 1,000 km (620 mi) from Opportunity, were discovered on 1 June 2018, in photographs by the Mars Color Imager (MARCI) camera on the Mars Reconnaissance Orbiter (MRO). More weather reports from the MRO and the MARCI team indicated a prolonged storm. Although this was, at that time, still far away from the rover, it influenced the atmospheric permeability (opacity) at the location. Within days, the storm had spread. As of 12 June 2018, the storm spanned an area of 41 million km^{2} (16 million sq mi) - about the area of North America and Russia combined. Although such dust storms are not surprising, they rarely occur. They can arise within a short time and then persist for weeks to months. During the southern season of summer, the sunlight heats dust particles and brings them higher into the atmosphere. This creates wind, which in turn stirs up more dust. This results in a feedback loop that scientists are still trying to understand. NASA reported on 20 June 2018, that the dust storm had grown to completely cover the entire planet.

On 4 June 2018, NASA announced that Curiosity's ability to drill has been sufficiently restored by engineers. The rover had experienced drill mechanical problems since December 2016.

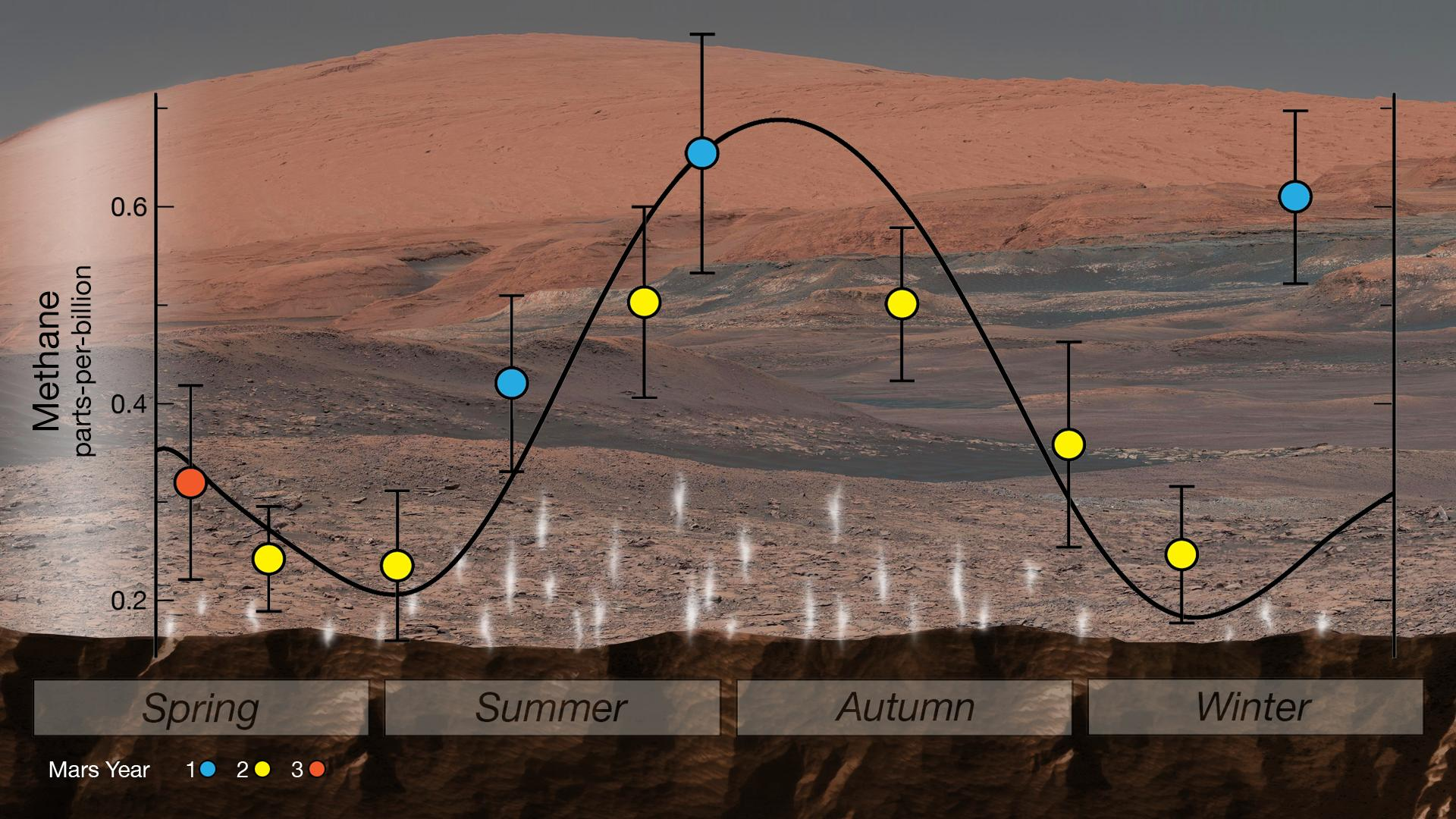
Curiosity detected a cyclical seasonal variation in atmospheric methane.

On 7 June 2018, NASA announced a cyclical seasonal variation in atmospheric methane, as well as the presence of kerogen and other complex organic compounds. The organic compounds were from mudstone rocks aged approximately 3.5 billion years old, sampled from two distinct sites in a dry lake in the Pahrump Hills of the Gale crater. The rock samples, when pyrolyzed via the Curiosity's Sample Analysis at Mars instrument, released an array of organic molecules; these include sulfur-containing thiophenes, aromatic compounds such as benzene and toluene, and aliphatic compounds such as propane and butene. The concentration of organic compounds are 100-fold higher than earlier measurements. The authors speculate that the presence of sulfur may have helped preserve them. The products resemble those obtained from the breakdown of kerogen, a precursor to oil and natural gas on Earth. NASA stated that these findings are not evidence that life existed on the planet, but that the organic compounds needed to sustain microscopic life were present, and that there may be deeper sources of organic compounds on the planet.

Since 15 September 2018, a glitch in Curiosity's active computer (Side-B) has prevented Curiosity from storing science and key engineering data. On 3 October 2018, the JPL began operating Curiosity on its backup computer (Side-A). Curiosity will store science and engineering data normally using its Side-A computer until the cause of the glitch in Side-B is determined and remedied.

On 4 November 2018, geologists presented evidence, based on studies in Gale Crater by the Curiosity rover, that there was plenty of water on early Mars.

On 26 November 2018, Curiosity viewed a shiny object (named, "Little Colonsay") on Mars. Although possibly a meteorite, further studies are planned to better understand its nature.

On 1 February 2019, NASA scientists reported that the Mars Curiosity rover determined, for the first time, the density of Mount Sharp in Gale crater, thereby establishing a clearer understanding of how the mountain was formed.

On 4 April 2019, NASA released images of solar eclipses by the two moons of the planet Mars, Phobos (animation1) and Deimos (animation2), as viewed by the Curiosity rover on the planet Mars in March 2019.

On 11 April 2019, NASA announced that the Curiosity rover on the planet Mars drilled into, and closely studied, a "clay-bearing unit" which, according to the rover Project Manager, is a "major milestone" in Curiosity's journey up Mount Sharp.

During June 2019, while still studying the clay-bearing unit, Curiosity detected the highest levels of methane gas, 21 parts per billion, compared to the typical 1 part per billion the rover detects as normal background readings. The levels of methane dropped quickly over a few days, leading NASA to call this event one of several methane plumes that they have observed before but without any observable pattern. The rover lacked the necessary instrumentation to determine if the methane was biological or inorganic in nature.

=== Third extended mission (October 2019 - September 2022) ===
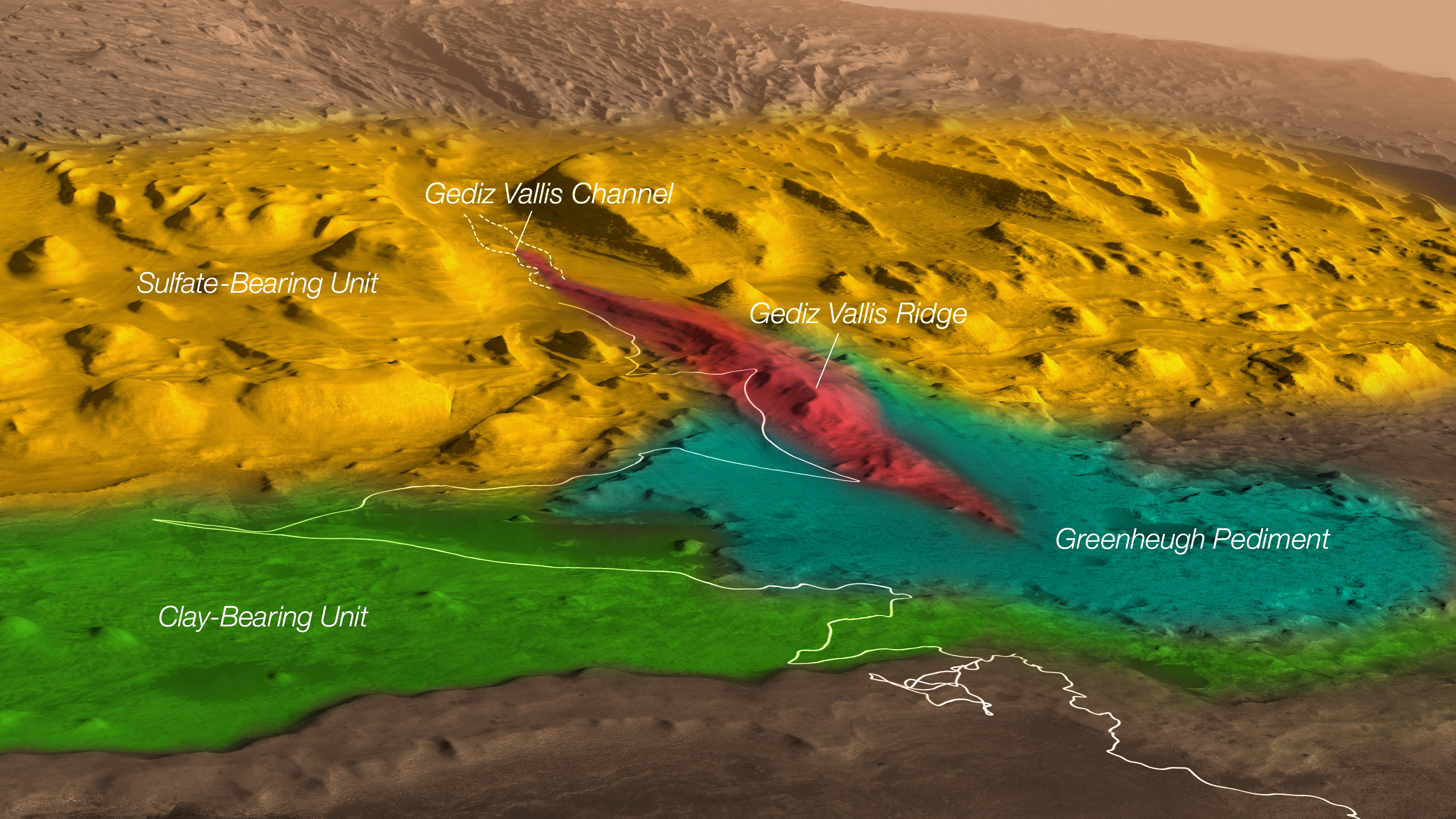
The planned route for Curiosity to follow as it ascends Mount Sharp during the third extended mission and beyond.

The third extended mission began on 1 October 2019 - the rover's 2544th sol on Mars. In October 2019, evidence in the form of magnesium sulfate deposits left behind in ways that suggested evaporation, uncovered by the Curiosity rover on Mount Sharp, was reported of a 150 km (93 mi) wide ancient basin in Gale crater that once may have contained a salty lake.

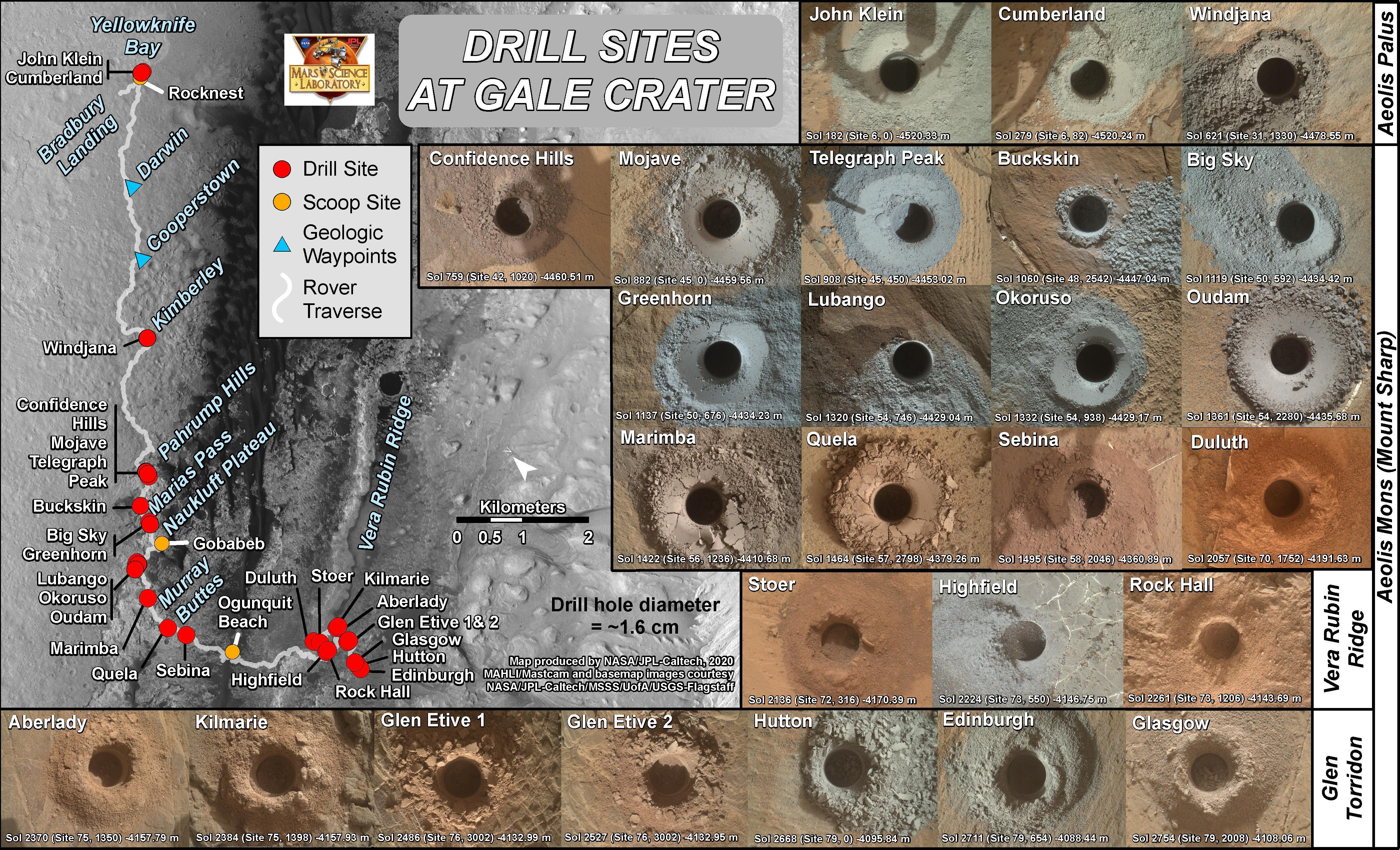
Curiosity's 26 drill holes as of the 1st of July, 2020.

In January 2020, a report was presented that compared Curiosity at the time of its landing on Mars in 2012, with the rover over seven years later in 2020.

In February 2020, scientists reported the detection of thiophene organic molecules by the Curiosity rover on the planet Mars. It is not currently known if the detected thiophenes — usually associated on Earth with kerogen, coal and crude oil — are the result of biological or non-biological processes.

In April 2020, scientists began operating the rover remotely from their homes due to the COVID-19 pandemic.

On 29 August 2020, NASA released several videos taken by the Curiosity rover, including those involving dust devils, as well as very high resolution images of the related local martian terrain.

In September 2020, Curiosity analyzed the Mary Anning 3 sample with its wet chemistry facilities. In April 2026, scientists announced that the sample showed signs of a diverse array of DNA precursors, including a benzene ring with an amine group, and sulfur-containing benzothiophene.

In June 2021, scientists determined that the methane concentration around Curiosity varied according to the time of sol, with methane present only at night. This explains the difference in methane levels detected by Curiosity and the Trace Gas Orbiter (an open question since 2016), although it does not explain what is creating the methane or why the methane seems to be more short-lived than current models predict. On 3 July 2021, the Curiosity rover viewed the "Rafael Navarro Mountain" area.

On 1 November 2021, astronomers reported detecting, in a "first-of-its-kind" process based on SAM instruments, organic molecules, including benzoic acid, ammonia and other related unknown compounds, on the planet Mars by the Curiosity rover.

On 17 January 2022, scientists reported finding an unusual signal of carbon isotopes on Mars by the Curiosity rover which may (or may not) be associated with ancient Martian life and suggesting, according to the scientists, that microbes residing underground may have emitted the "enriched carbon as methane gas". However, abiotic sources of the unusual carbon signal have not been completely ruled out.

In April 2022, Mars Science Laboratory was renewed for a fourth extended mission, which will include the exploration of the sulfate-bearing unit.

=== Fourth extended mission (October 2022 - September 2025) ===
The planned path of Curiosity to Gediz Vallis Ridge and beyond, commencing during the fourth extended mission.

The rover began its fourth extended mission on 1 October 2022, which will last until October 2025.

In January 2023, the Curiosity Rover viewed and studied the "Cacao" meteorite.

In August 2023, Curiosity explored the upper Gediz Vallis Ridge. A panoramic view of the ridge is here, and a 3D rendered view is here.

In February 2024, Curiosity completed its 40th successful drilling, of a rock named "Mineral King" in Gediz Vallis.

In July 2024, it was announced that, in an analysis of a rock that had been crushed by the rover (one in a series of deposits), elemental pure sulfur had been found on Mars for the first time.

In October 2024, the science team behind the SAM experiment onboard the rover announced the results of three years of sampling, which suggested that based on high carbon-13 and oxygen-18 levels in the regolith, the early Martian atmosphere was unlikely to be stable enough to support surface water hospitable to life, with rapid wetting-drying cycles and very high-salinity cryogenic brines providing an explanation.

In March 2025, an analysis of a Cumberland mudstone sampled by Curiosity was published, announcing the discovery of indigenous decane, undecane, and dodecane, the heaviest organic molecule ever discovered on Mars, preserved in Gale crater. The study made no definite statement about their origin, but hypothesized that the alkanes were derived from the degradation of carboxylic acids.

In the spring of 2025, NASA announced that Curiosity had found carbonates in the form of crystalline siderite (FeCO_{3}). One rock contained over 10% of the mineral. These were expected on Mars due to the carbon dioxide atmosphere. Not many carbonates were detected from orbit because they may be obscured by dust. The rocks also were composed of plagioclase with the elements sodium (Na)–, Ca-, and aluminum (Al)–, as well as Ca- and Mg-bearing silicate mineral pyroxene. Other minerals found were calcium sulfates, magnesium sulfates, different amounts of iron oxyhydroxides, and an unidentified X-ray amorphous material. Rover's Chemistry and Mineralogy (CheMin) instrument uses X-ray diffraction to determine sample mineralogy. The names of the rock formations and drill sites are CA, Canaima; TC, Tapo Caparo; UB, Ubajara; and SQ, Sequoia.

=== Fifth extended mission (October 2025 - Present) ===
The rover began its fifth extended mission in October 2025, which will last until the next planetary mission senior review in 2028. The plan for this extended mission is for the rover to finish exploring the Mg-sulfate unit, which it first reached in the previous extended mission. The rover will then explore the contact point between the Mg-sulfate unit and the Yardang unit as it moves back towards Gediz Vallis. The rover attempted to image the out-of contact MAVEN orbiter on Dec 16 and 20 using its Mastcam but was unsuccessful.

During the fifth extended mission, Curiosity successfully drilled its 44th total hole, in the boxwork region. It is the first of two planned drills in the boxwork region, although Curiosity had already drilled at the edge of the boxwork region in the previous extended mission. The second drilling, and 45th overall, occurred on Sol 4718 (November 2025). The drills in the boxwork region had been in planning for 2 years by the time they were finally executed. From December 27th to January 20th 2026, contact with the rover was cut off due to the solar conjunction. After contact returned, Curiosity completed an additional drilling in the boxwork region, in the same region as the 45th drilling; on this sample, Curiosity performed its last TMAH wet chemistry experiment.

== Timeline of drill holes ==
As part of its mission, Curiosity has drilled into rocks at various sites along its ascent up Mount Sharp. Images of each drill site are obtained using the Mars Hand Lens Imager (MAHLI). Curiosity then collects a sample from the drill site, which is handled by the Collection and Handling for In-Situ Martian Rock Analysis (CHIMRA) device before being analyzed by the Chemistry and Mineralogy (CheMin) and Sample Analysis at Mars (SAM) instrument. For the most interesting experiments, Curiosity can perform a 'wet chemistry' experiment which improves SAM's chance of detecting organic compounds; however, only 9 containers of the solvent used for this experiment are available. Two of these contain tetramethylammonium hydroxide (TMAH), whereas the remaining seven hold mixtures of MTBSTFA and DMF. In addition to the wet chemistry cups, Curiosity has 6 calibration cups and 59 dry quartz cups.

- 6 August 2012 – 7 December 2012 (Sol 1–120): 9 evolved gas experiments were performed on atmospheric samples (which do not use up quartz cups), and 4 evolved gas experiments were performed on rocknest dust samples (which do use up quartz cups). All used the quadrupole mass spectrometer and the tunable laser spectrometer.
- 6 February 2013 (Sol 180): A mini-drill was performed to validate the rover's drilling capability.
- 8 February 2013 (Sol 182): Drill 1. The first full hole ever drilled on Mars; the source rock was named 'John Klein' after the late MSL deputy project manager.
- 19 May 2013 (Sol 279): Drill 2. This sample was taken from a similar rock to that of the previous, allowing results from the first drill to be validated.
- 21 May 2013 (Sol 281): Evolved gas analysis on the 'Cumberland' sample retrieved from the second drilling.
- May 2013 (Sol 286): A second evolved gas analysis on the 'Cumberland' sample retrieved from the second drilling.
- June 2013 (Sol 290): A third evolved gas analysis on the 'Cumberland' sample.
- 2013 (Sol 368): A fourth evolved gas analysis on the 'Cumberland' sample.
- 21 May 2013 (Sol 382): A fifth evolved gas analysis on the 'Cumberland' sample.
- 29 April 2014 (Sol 615): A mini-drill was performed to test if the 'Windjana' rock was suitable for full sampling.
- 5 May 2014 (Sol 621): Drill 3. The last drill of the prime mission and the first drill in almost a year.
- 19 August 2014 (Sol 724): A mini-drill was attempted near the 'Bonanza King' rock, but failed due to the system's fault protection protocol being triggered. Due to the results, Curiosity dit not make further attempts to drill at this rock.
- 21 September 2014 (Sol 756): A mini-drill was performed in preparation for a full drill at Confidence Hills.
- 24 September 2014 (Sol 759): Drill 4, at Confidence Hills.
- 13 January 2015 (Sol 867): A mini-drill was performed on the 'Mojave' rock. The rock turned out to be softer than expected, resulting in rock fragments being thrown from the drill site.
- 28 January 2015 (Sol 881): A mini-drill was performed on a similar rock, 'Mojave 2'. A new, less impactful method for operating the drill was used, due to the results on the first Mojave rock.
- 29 January 2015 (Sol 882): Drill 5, on Mojave 2.
- 25 February 2015 (Sol 908): Drill 6. This was the final drill site in Pahrump Hills; the sample was named 'Telegraph Peak'.
- March 2015 (Sol 928): An evolved gas analysis was performed on 'Telegraph Peak'.
- 27 February 2015 (Sol 911): The rover experienced a short circuit when preparing to analyze the drill sample. The fault was significant enough that other operations with the rover were paused while analysis was carried out.
- 12 July 2015 (Sol 1059): A mini-start (mini-drills purposefully ended early) was performed on the 'Buckskin' rock. From this point on, mini-starts were preferred to mini-drills as they were determined to be sufficient for establishing drilling safety.
- 13 July 2015 (Sol 1060): Drill 7, on Buckskin.
- 14 August 2015 (Sol 1077): Evolved gas analysis on Buckskin.
- 25 September 2015 (Sol 1116): A mini-start was performed on the 'Big Sky' rock.
- 29 September 2015 (Sol 1119): Drill 8, on Big Sky.
- October 2015 (Sol 1130): Evolved gas analysis on Big Sky.
- 14 October 2015 (Sol 1134): A mini-start was performed on the 'Pilgrim' rock.
- 18 October 2015 (Sol 1137): Drill 9, on the 'Greenhorn' rock.
- 26 October 2015 (Sol 1147): Evolved gas analysis on the 'Greenhorn' sample.
- 12 January 2016: A soil sample was taken, named 'Gobabeb'.
- January 2016 (Sol 1237): Evolved gas analysis on 'Gobabeb'.
- 23 April 2016 (Sol 1320): Drill 10, at a rock named Lubango.
- 5 May 2016 (Sol 1332): Drill 11, at Okoruso.
- 4 June 2016 (Sol 1361): Drill 12, on a sample called Oudam in the Murray Formation.
- June 2016 (Sol 1382): Evolved gas analysis on Oudam.
- 6 August 2016 (Sol 1422): Drill 13, on a sample called Marimba. Another short circuit happened in the drill percussion mechanism during transfer of the sample to the sample handling mechanism.
- August 2016 (Sol 1442): Evolved gas analysis on Marimba.
- 18 September 2016 (Sol 1464): Drill 14, at a site named Quela.
- 20 October 2016 (Sol 1495): Drill 15, at a site named Sebina.
- 1 December 2016 (Sol 1563): An attempt at sampling a site named Precipice. This was the first attempt of rotary-only drilling; the attempt failed due to the drill feed mechanism stalling. The fault was serious; the drill would never again be able to operate in the manner it was origninally designed to.
- 28 March 2017 (Sol 1651): The Ogunquit Beach sample was acquired. Due to issues with the drilling arm, this sample was not drilled, but rather scooped up particles of sand.
- 11 December 2017 (Sol 1900–1901): Evolved gas analysis on the Ogunquit Beach sample, which was collected many sols earlier.
- 18 December 2017 (Sol 1909): Wet chemistry 1 of 9 (MTBSTFA/DMF 1 of 7). The experiment was performed on the 'Ogunquit Beach' target.
- 26 February 2018 (Sol 1977): The first drill attempt using a new drill method designed to avoid the fault identified earlier, and the first drill attempt in more than a year. The site, Lake Orcadie, was too hard for a successful sample.
- 6 March 2018 (Sol 1983): The second drill attempt at Lake Orcadie; it was not enough to penetrate the rock.
- 20 May 2018 (Sol 2057): Drill 16. The first successful drilling in over a year, using the new 'Feed Extended Drilling' technique to avoid the problems faced previously.
- June 2018 (Sol 2072): Evolved gas analysis on Duluth, the 16th drilled sample.
- 16 July 2018 (Sol 2112): A failed attempt at drilling the Voyageurs site.
- 25 July 2018 (Sol 2122): Another failed drilling attempt, at the Ailsa Craig site.
- 9 August 2018 (Sol 2136): Drill 17, at the Stoer drill site in Vera Rubin ridge.
- 20 August 2018 (Sol 2147): Evolved gas analysis on the Stoer sample.
- 6 September 2018: A paper was published by JPL, analyzing the results of the drilling campaign during the prime mission.
- 13 September 2018 (Sol 2170): A failed attempt to drill at the 'Inverness' site.
- 8 November 2018 (Sol 2224): Drill 18, at the Highfield site.
- November 2018 (Sol 2231): Evolved gas analysis on Highfield.
- 16 December 2018 (Sol 2261): Drill 19, at the Rock Hall site.
- January 2019 (Sol 2281): Evolved gas analysis on Rock Hall.
- 7 April 2019 (Sol 2370): Drill 20, at the Aberlady drill site. It was the first drill site in the clay-bearing unit.
- 19 April 2019 (Sol 2384): Drill 21, at the Kilmarie drill site. Two evolved gas analyses would later be performed on the sample.
- 3 August 2019 (Sol 2488): Drill 22, at the Glen Etive 1 drill site. Later, two dry evolved gas analyses would be performed on the sample.
- 17 September 2019 (Sol 2529): Drill 23, at the Glen Etive 2 drill site. Later, a dry evolved gas experiment would be performed on the sample.
- 24 September 2019 (Sol 2536): Wet chemistry 2 of 9 (MTBSTFA/DMF 2 of 7). This was the first wet chemistry experiment on a drill sample, Glen Etive.
- 10 February 2020 (Sol 2671): Drill 24, at the Hutton drill site.
- 14 February 2020 (Sol 2676): Evolved gas analysis on the Hutton sample.
- 24 March 2020 (Sol 2714): Drill 25, at the Edinburgh drill site. This was the first time since the new drilling method was implemented in 2018 that Curiosity drilled into sandstone. It was the first drill site on the Greenheugh Pediment.
- April 2020 (Sol 2721): Evolved gas analysis on the Edinburgh sample.
- 4 May 2020 (Sol 2752): A failed attempt was made at drilling into the Glasgow drill site.
- 6 May 2020 (Sol 2754): Drill 26, at the Glasgow drill site. Two evolved gas analyses would later be performed on the sample.
- 2 June 2020: A paper was published by JPL, analyzing the results of the drilling campaign during the second and third Martian years.
- 27 July 2020: A paper was published by JPL, analyzing the results of the drilling campaign during Curiosity's traverse through Vera Rubin ridge.
- 2 August 2020 (Sol 2838): Drill 27, at the Mary Anning drill site. Later, two evolved gas analyses were performed on this Mary Anning sample.
- 19 August 2020 (Sol 2870): Drill 28, also at the Mary Anning drill site. The target was called 'Mary Anning 3'; a 'Mary Anning 2' target was investigated but ultimately not selected for drilling.
- 9 September 2020 (Sol 2879): Wet chemistry 3 of 9 (TMAH 1 of 2) on the Mary Anning 3 sample. This was the first SAM TMAH experiment; this used one of the two TMAH containers.
- 16 September 2020 (Sol 2885): Wet chemistry 4 of 9 (MTBSTFA/DMF 3 of 7); this was the second wet chemistry experiment was performed on the Mary Anning 3 target.
- 16 October 2020 (Sol 2910): Drill 29, at the Groken drill site. Later, an evolved gas analysis was performed on the sample.
- 10 March 2021 (Sol 3057): Drill 30, at the Nontron drill site. This was the first drilling in the transition region between the clay and sulfate units. Two evolved gas analyses would later be performed on this sample.
- 20 April 2021 (Sol 3094): Drill 31, at the Bardou drill site.
- May 2021 (Sol 3098): Evolved gas analysis on Bardou.
- 7 July 2021 (Sol 3170): Drill 32, at the Pontours drill site.
- July 2021 (Sol 3176): Evolved gas analysis on Pontours.
- 3 September 2021 (Sol 3229): Drill 33, at the Maria Gordon drill site. Two evolved gas analyses would later be performed on this sample.
- 5 November 2021 (Sol 3289): Drill 34, at the Zechstein drill site. An evolved gas analysis would later be performed on this sample.
- 23 June 2022 (Sol 3512): Drill 35, at the Avanavero drill site. An evolved gas analysis would later be performed on this sample.
- 8 July 2022 (Sol 3528): Evolved gas analysis on the Avanavero sample.
- 26 June 2022: A paper was published by JPL, analyzing the results of the drilling campaign during Curiosity's traverse through the clay-bearing region known as Glen Torridon.
- 3 October 2022 (Sol 3612): Drill 36, at the Canaima drill site. This was the first drill site fully in the sulfate-bearing unit. Two evolved gas analyses would later be performed on this sample.
- 9 December 2022 (Sol 3677): A drilling attempt was made on the Amapari target; however, the drill was not able to penetrate deep enough to get a sample.
- 13 December 2022 (Sol 3681): A second failed drilling attempt was made on the Amapari target.
- 27 February 2023 (Sol 3752): Drill 37, at the Tapo Caparo drill site.
- 9 May 2023 (Sol 3823): Drill 38, at the Ubajara drill site.
- 15 May 2023 (Sol 3830): Evolved gas analysis on the Ubajara sample.
- 19 October 2023 (Sol 3982): Drill 39, at the Sequoia drill site.
- 26 October 2023 (Sol 3989–3990): Evolved gas analysis on the Sequoia sample.
- 1 March 2024 (Sol 4110): Drill 40, at the Mineral King drill site.
- 12 June 2024 (Sol 4214): A planned drill at the Mammoth Lakes site failed the preload test; no drill took place.
- 17 June 2024 (Sol 4218): Drill 41. A second spot 6 centimeters away from the Mammoth Lakes target, 'Mammoth Lakes 2', was selected for drilling due to interest in the area.
- 1 July 2024 (Sol 4228): Evolved gas analysis on the Mammoth Lakes 2 sample.
- 3 August 2024 (Sol 4263): Drill 42, at the Kings Canyon drill site.
- 12 August 2024 (Sol 4272): Evolved gas analysis on the Kings Canyon sample.
- 8 June 2025 (Sol 4564): Drill 43, at the Altadena drill site. This was the final drilling of the fourth extended mission.
- 9 October 2025 (Sol 4695): Drill 44, at the Valle de la Luna drill site. This was the first of two planned drillings in the boxwork region.
- 24 October 2025 (Sol 4701): Evolved gas analysis on the Valle de la Luna sample.
- 13 November 2025 (Sol 4718): Drill 45, at the Nevado Sajama drill site. This was the second of two planned drillings in the boxwork region.
- 21 November 2025 (Sol 4723–4730): Evolved gas analysis on the Nevado Sajama sample.
- 31 January 2026 (Sol 4795): Drill 46, Wet chemistry 5 of 9 (TMAH 2 of 2). Called 'Nevado Sajama 2', it was the target for the final TMAH wet chemistry experiment.
- 16 May 2026 (Sol 4897): Drill 47, at the 'Campo Marte' drill site.
- 24 September 2026 (Sol 5024): Drill 48, at the 'Basque Lakes' drill site.
- 20 October 2026 (Sol 5050): Drill 49, called Nazca.
- 1 November 2026 (Sol 5061): While analyzing Nazca, Curiosity tests performing multiple operations at once ('parallelism'). If deemed safe and successful, parallelizing activities will help conserve power.

== Current status ==
=== Weather ===
- Current Weather Report on Mars by the Curiosity rover
- Current Weather Report on Mars by the InSight lander
- Current Weather Report on Mars by the Perseverance rover

=== Location and travel statistics ===
- This up-to-date NASA link shows Curiosity's travels and present location

Distance traveled over time by Curiosity

As of November 10, 2026, Curiosity has been on the planet Mars for 5070 sols (5209 total days) since landing on 6 August 2012. Since 11 September 2014, Curiosity has been exploring the slopes of Mount Sharp, where more information about the history of Mars is expected to be found. As of today, the rover has traveled over 36.86 km (22.90 mi) and as of January 2025 climbed over 740 m (2,430 ft) in elevation to, and around, the mountain base since arriving at Bradbury Landing in August 2012.

=== Equipment status ===
Since early 2015, the percussive mechanism in the drill that chisels into rock has had an intermittent electrical short circuit.

In December 2016, the motor inside the drill caused a malfunction that prevented the rover from moving its robotic arm and driving to another location. The fault is in the drill feed motor - internal debris is suspected. The fault was determined to be limited to the drill mechanism and the rover started moving again on 9 December. The robotic arm is functional, and the Curiosity team performed diagnostics on the drill mechanism throughout 2017. On 4 June 2018, NASA announced that Curiosity's ability to drill has been sufficiently restored by changing the drilling methods.

Since 15 September 2018, a glitch in Curiosity's active computer (Side-B) has prevented Curiosity from storing science and key engineering data. On 3 October 2018, the JPL began operating Curiosity on its backup computer (Side-A). Curiosity will store science and engineering data normally using its Side-A computer until the cause of the glitch in Side-B is determined and remedied.

== Self-Portraits ==
Curiosity rover on Mount Sharp on Mars — self-portraits

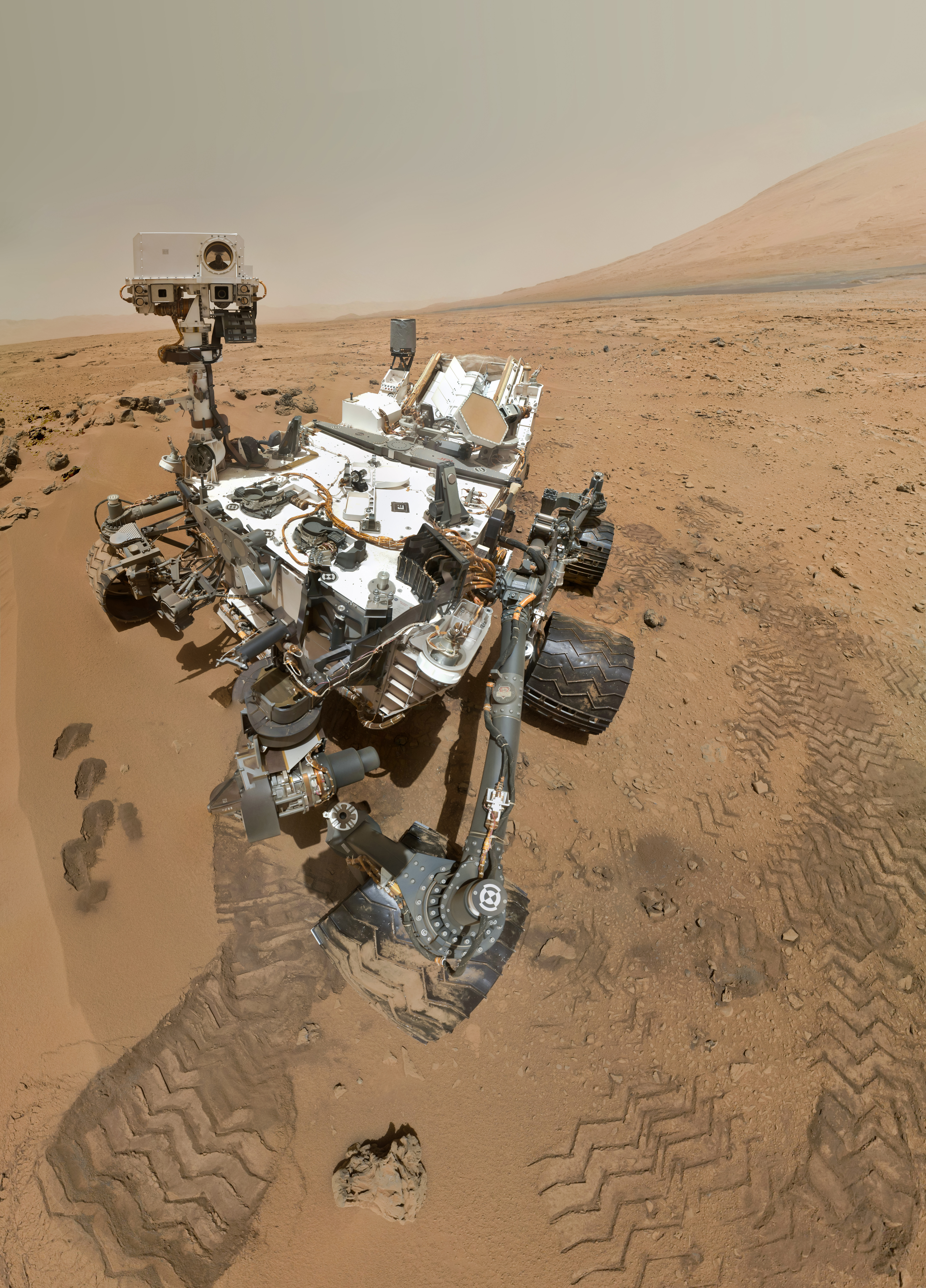
"Rocknest"
(Oc2012)

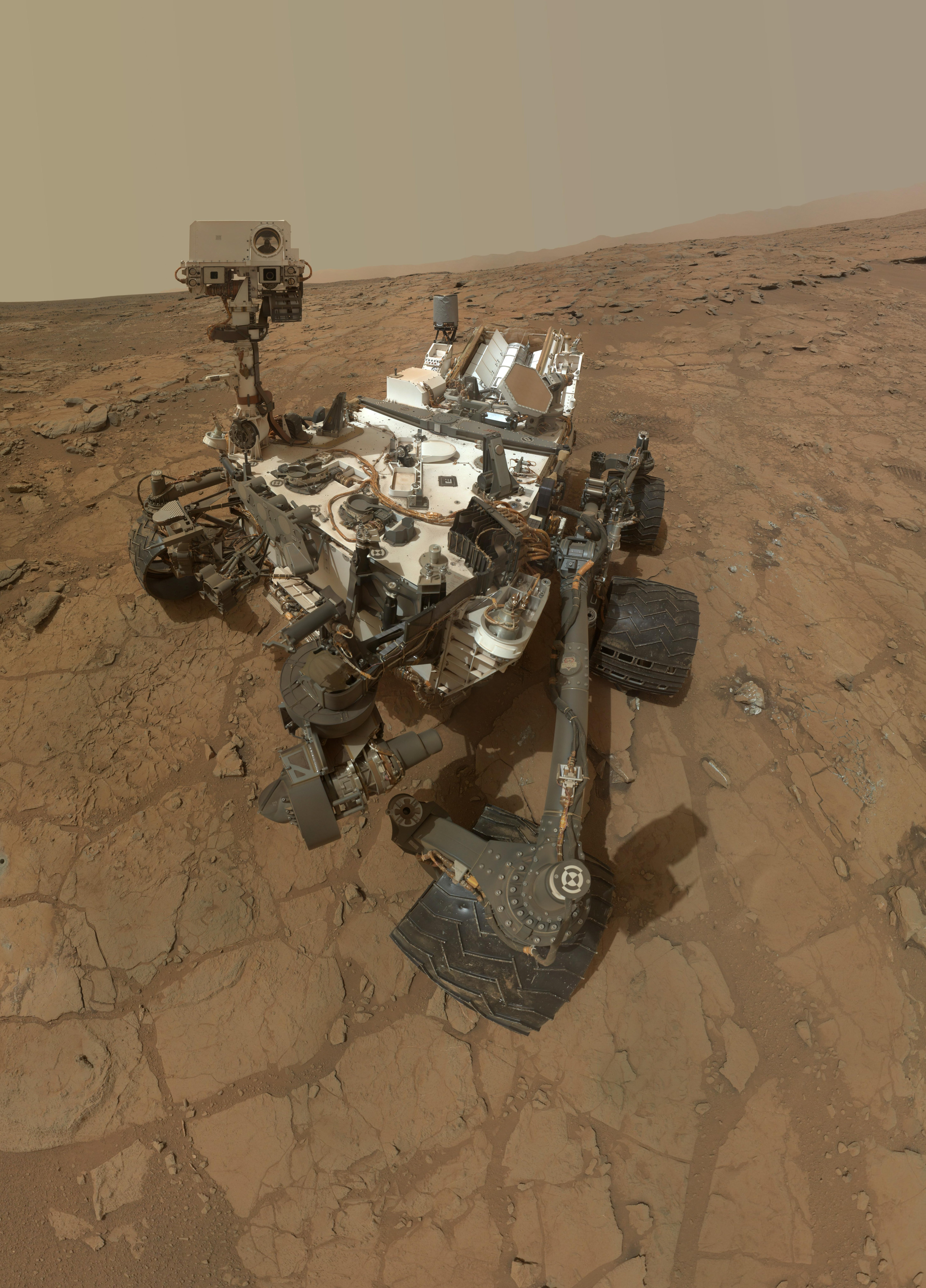
"JohnKlein"
(Ma2013)

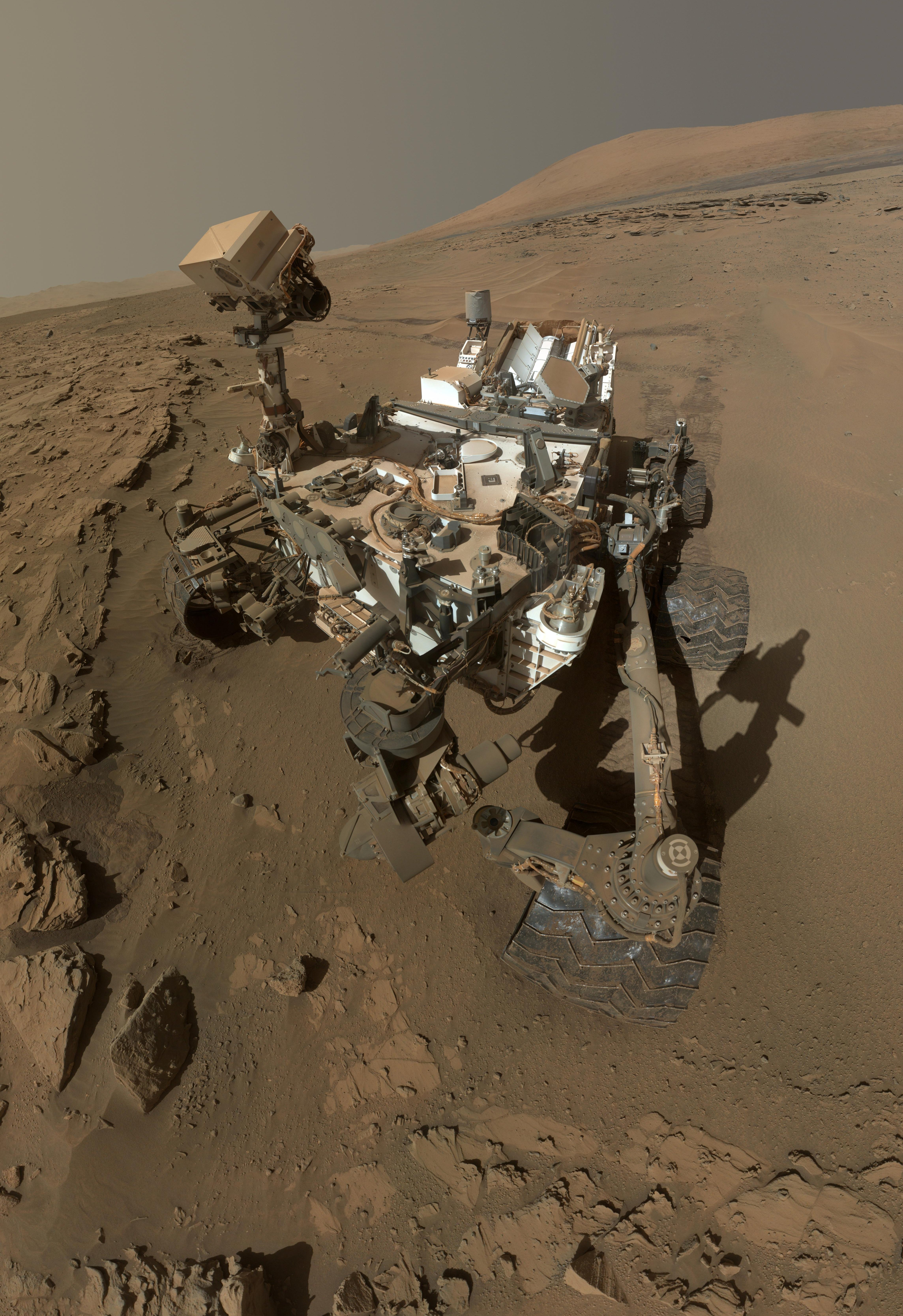
"Windjana"
(Ma2014)

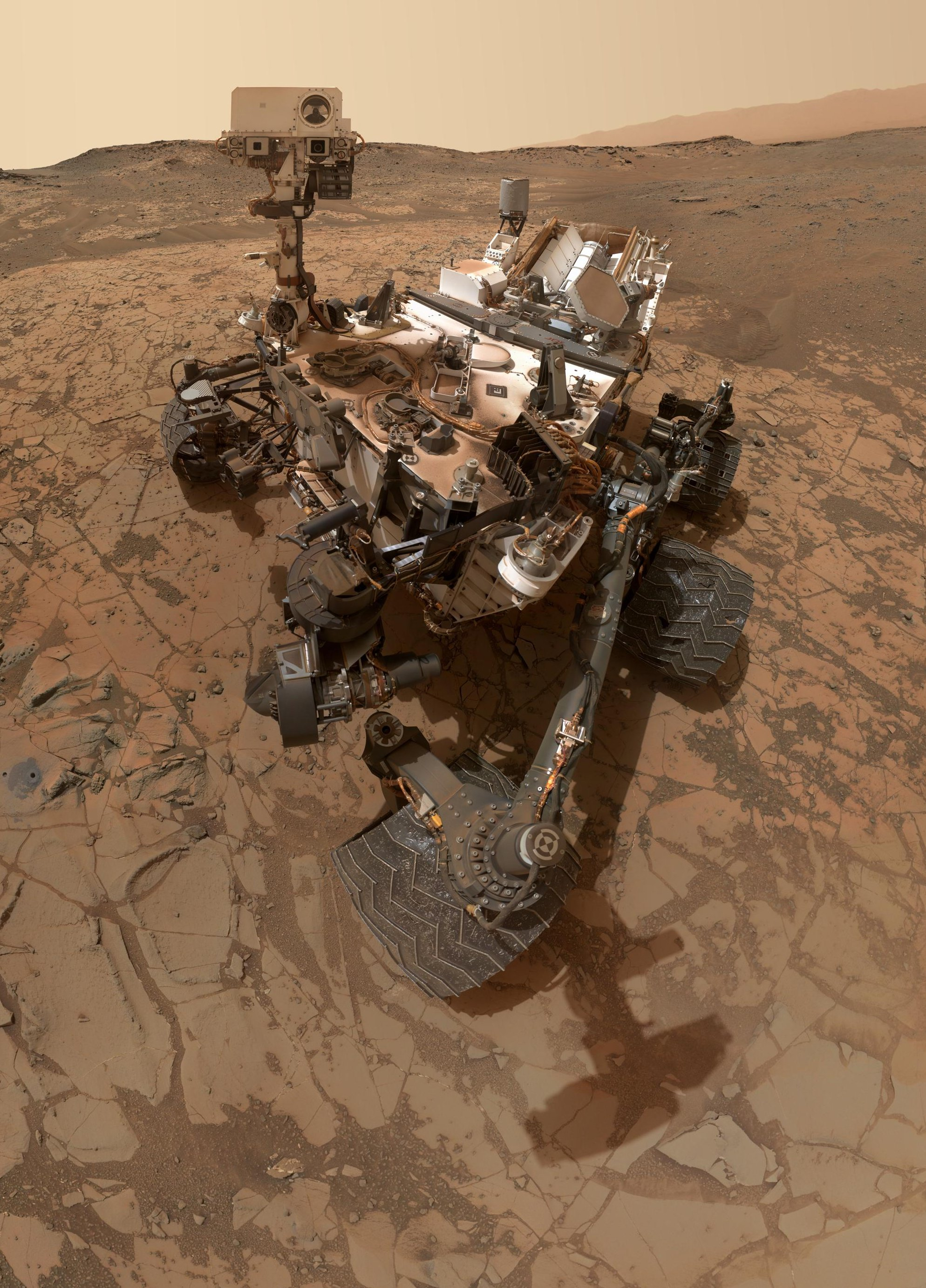
"Mojave"
(Ja2015)

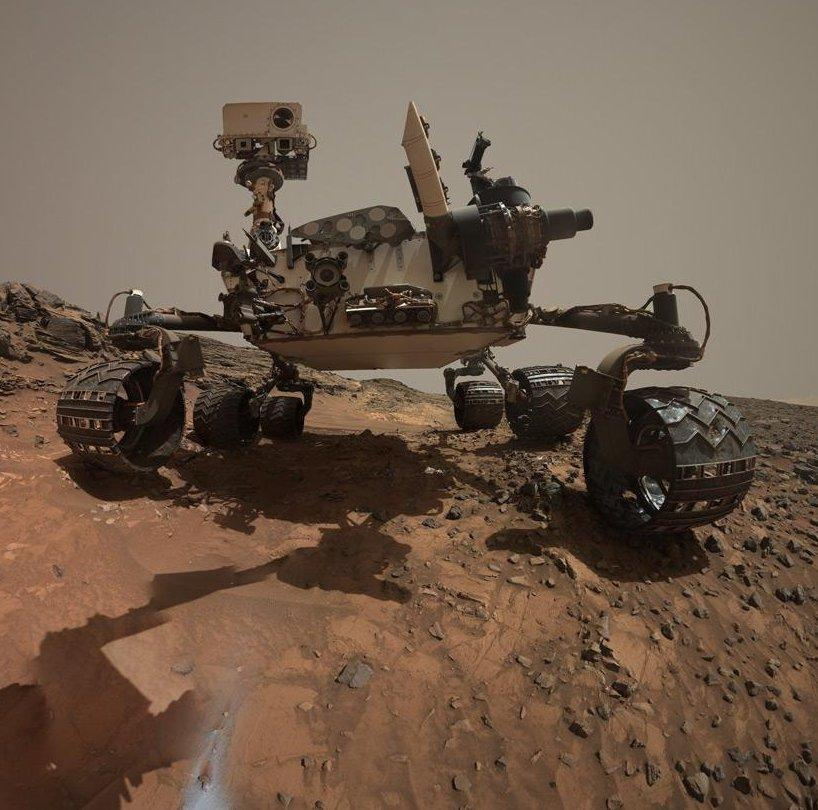
"Buckskin"
(Aug2015)

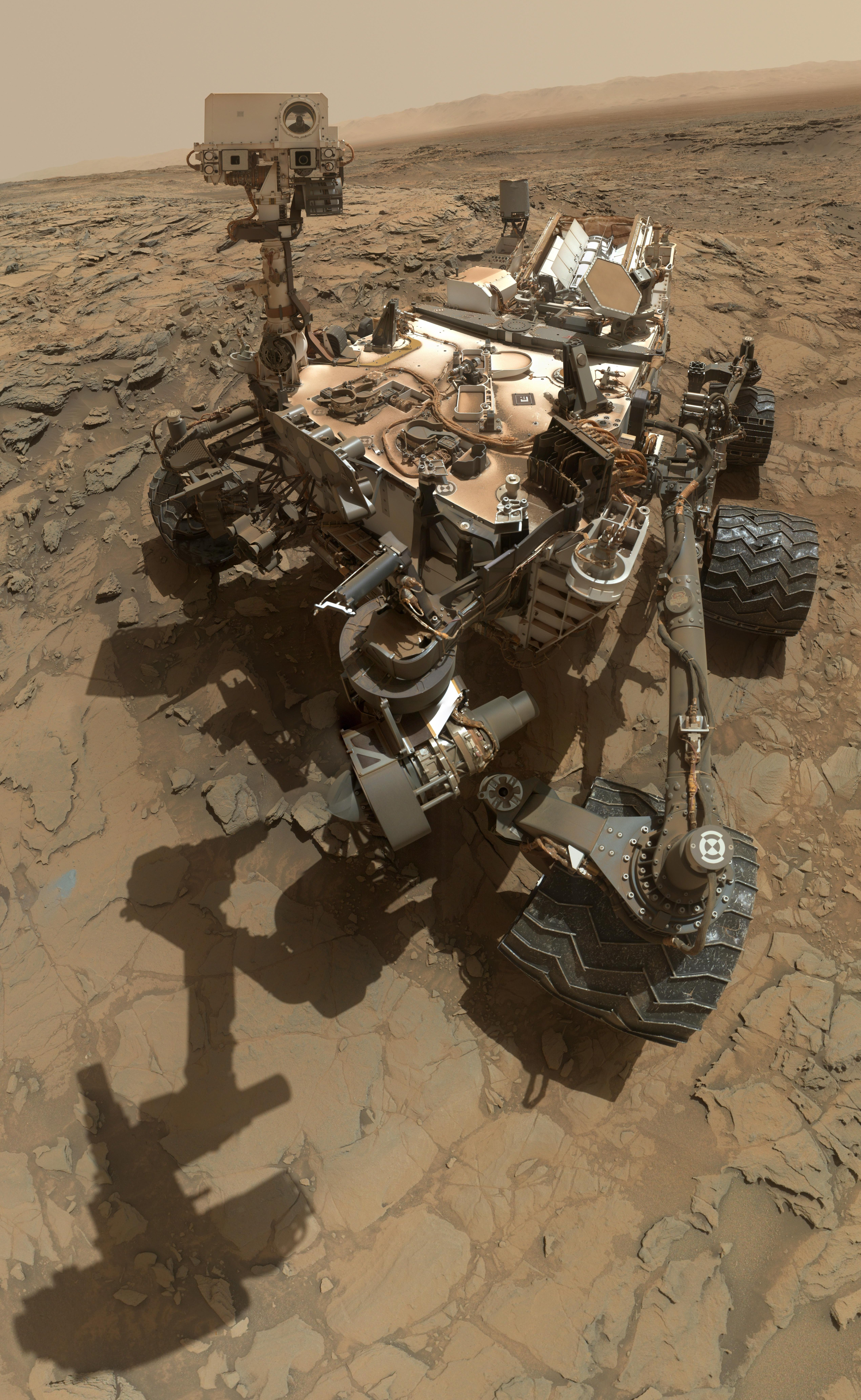
"BigSky"
(Oc2015)

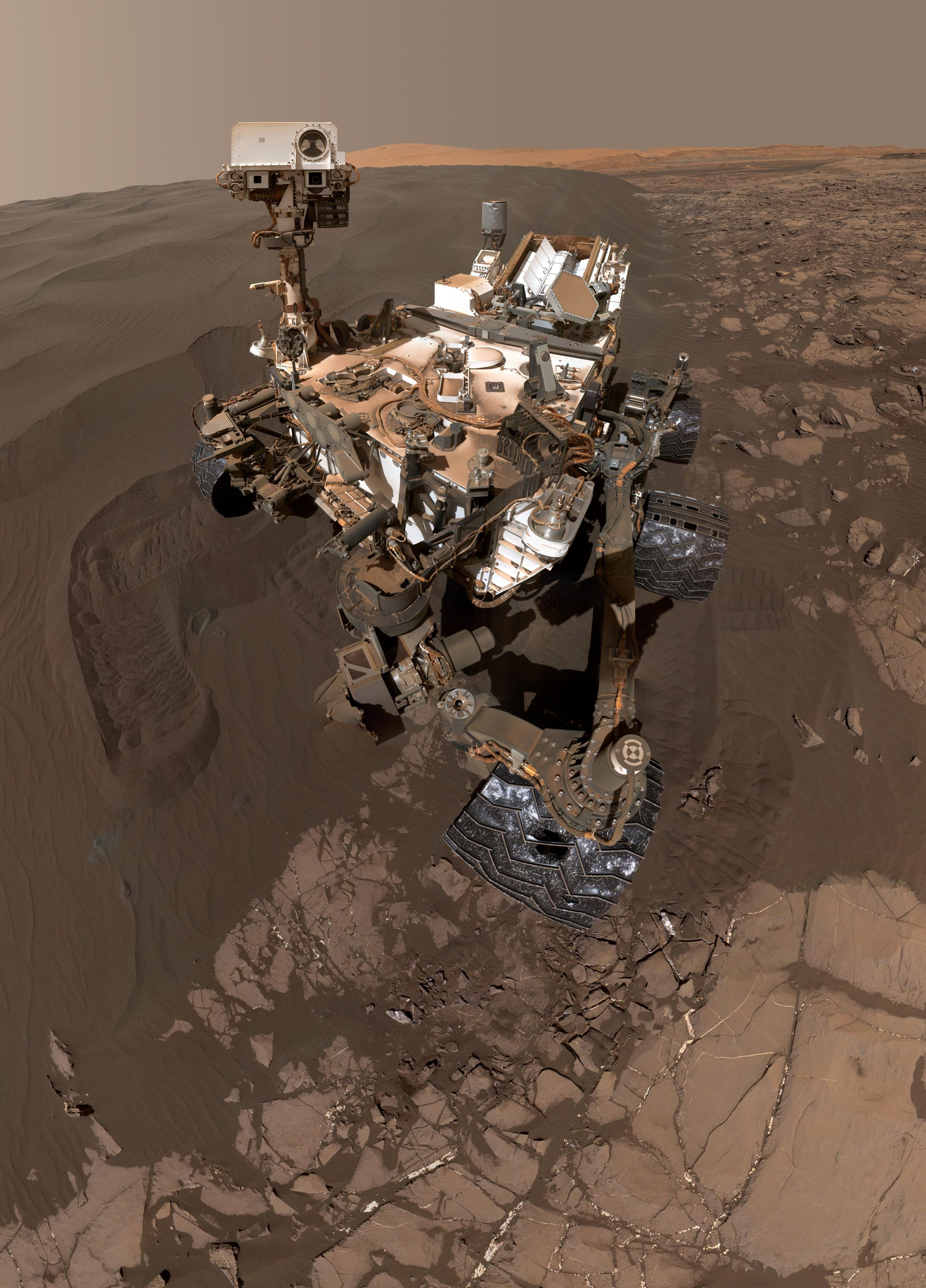
"Namib"
(Ja2016)

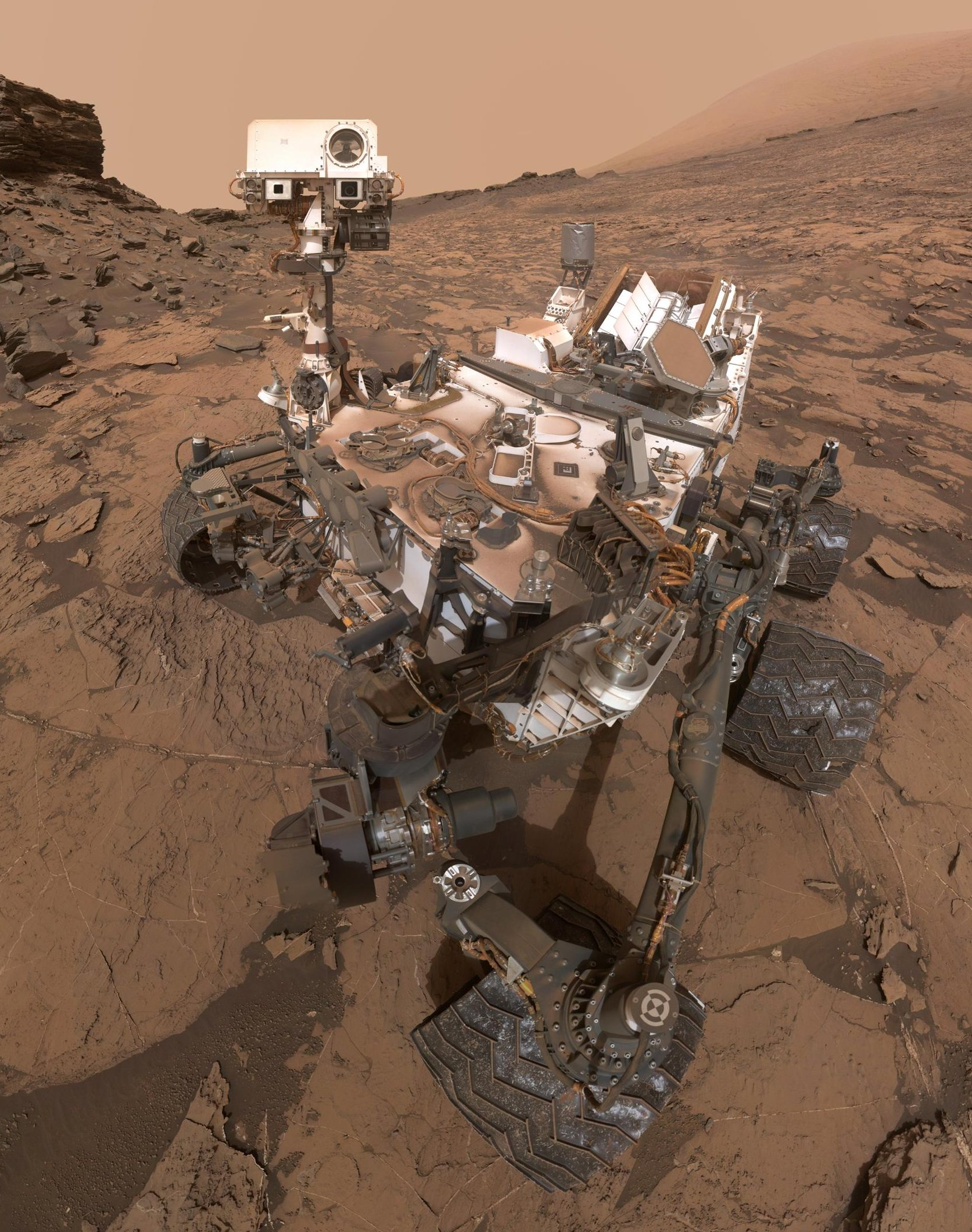
"Murray"
(Se2016)

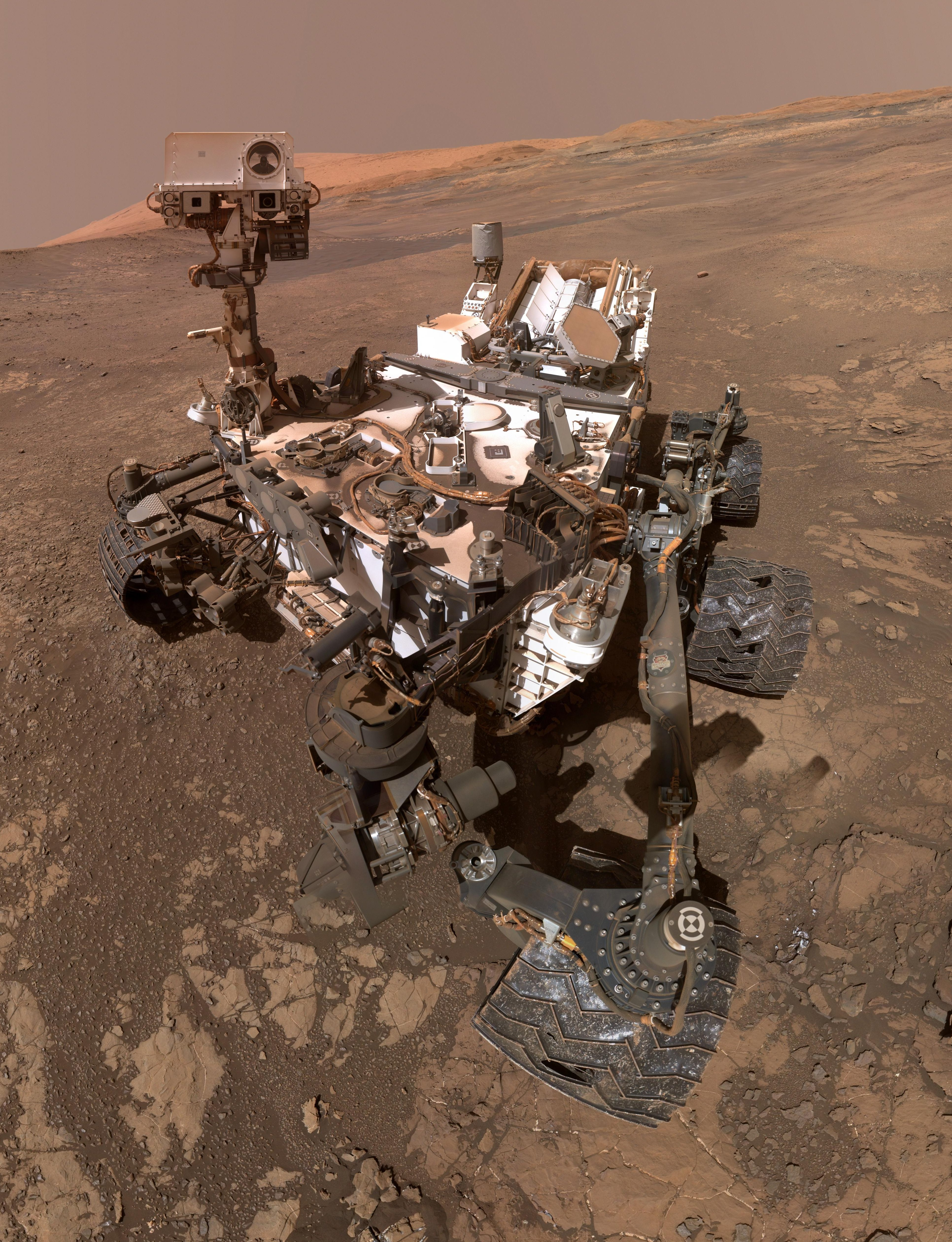
"VeraRub"
(Ja2018)

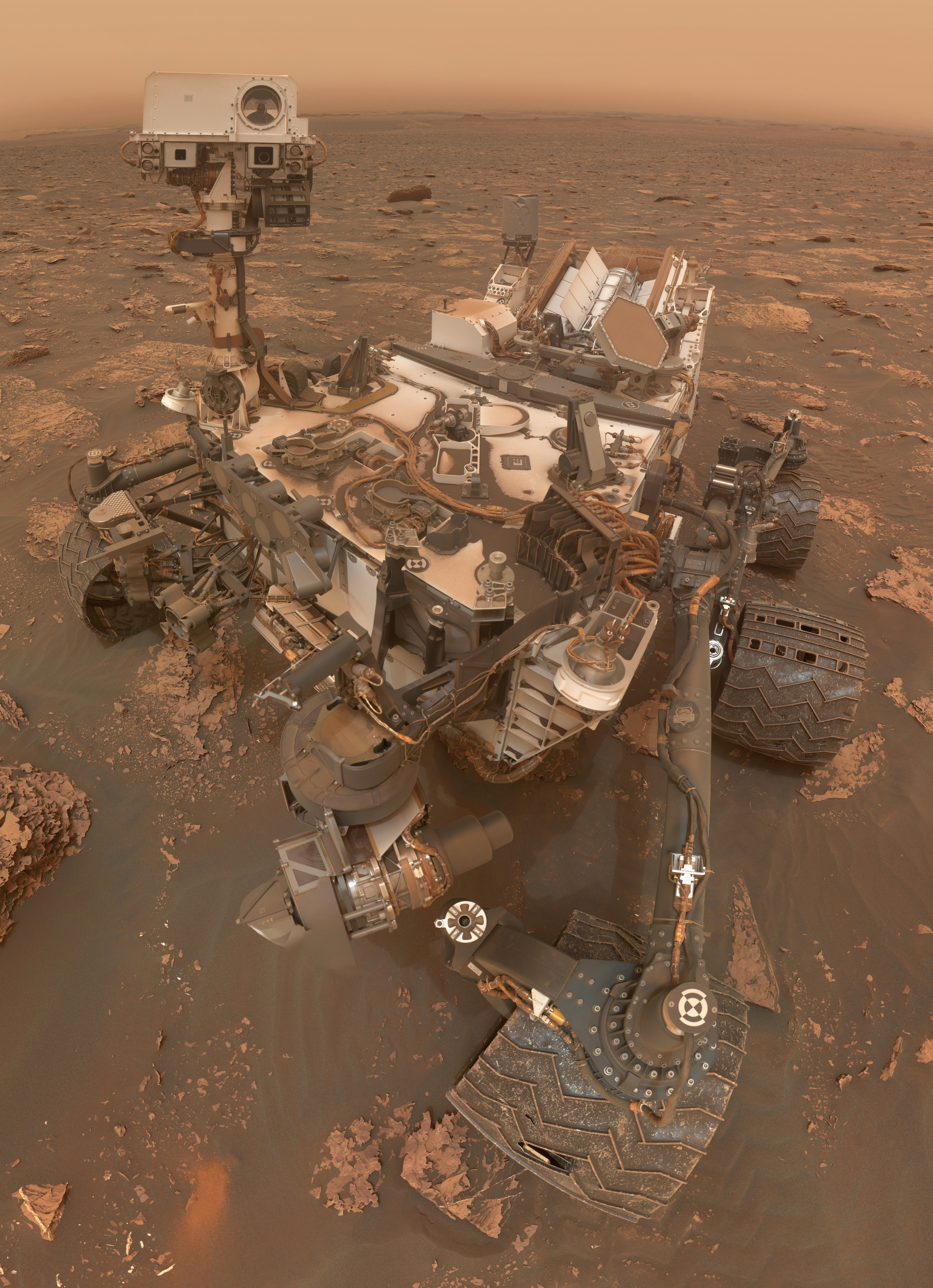
"DustStrm"
(Ju2018)

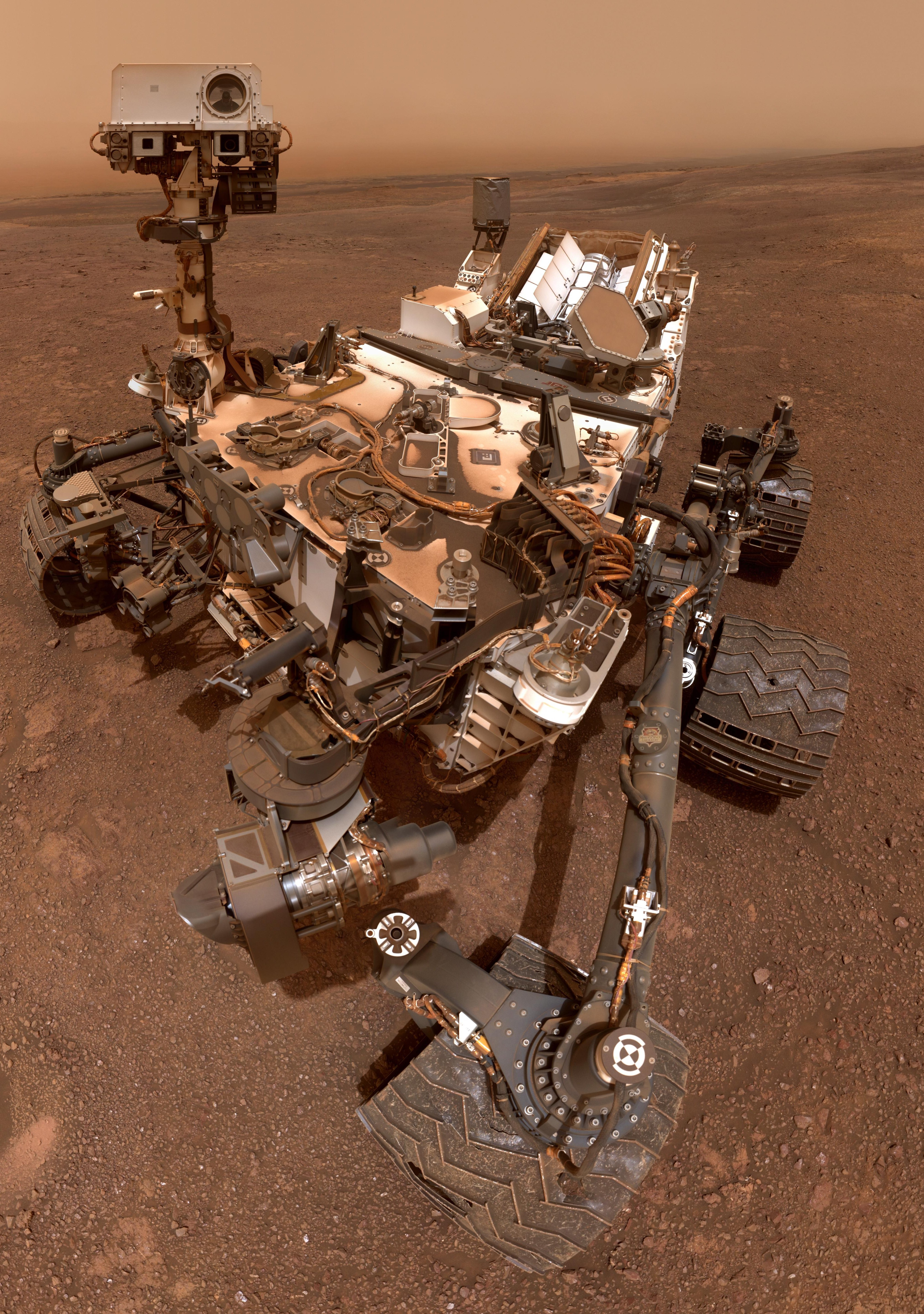
"VeraRub"
(Ja2019)

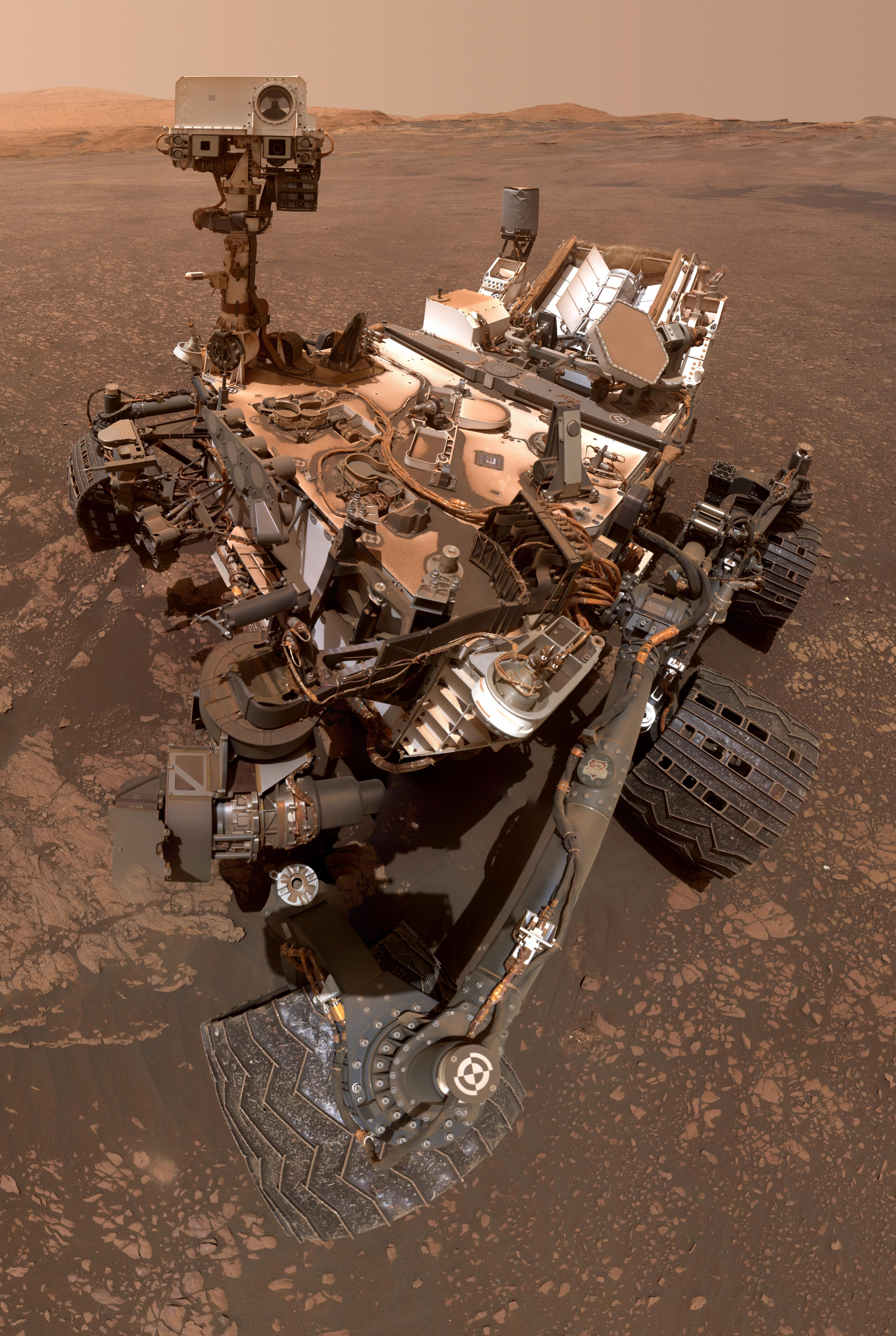
"Aberlady"
(Ma2019)

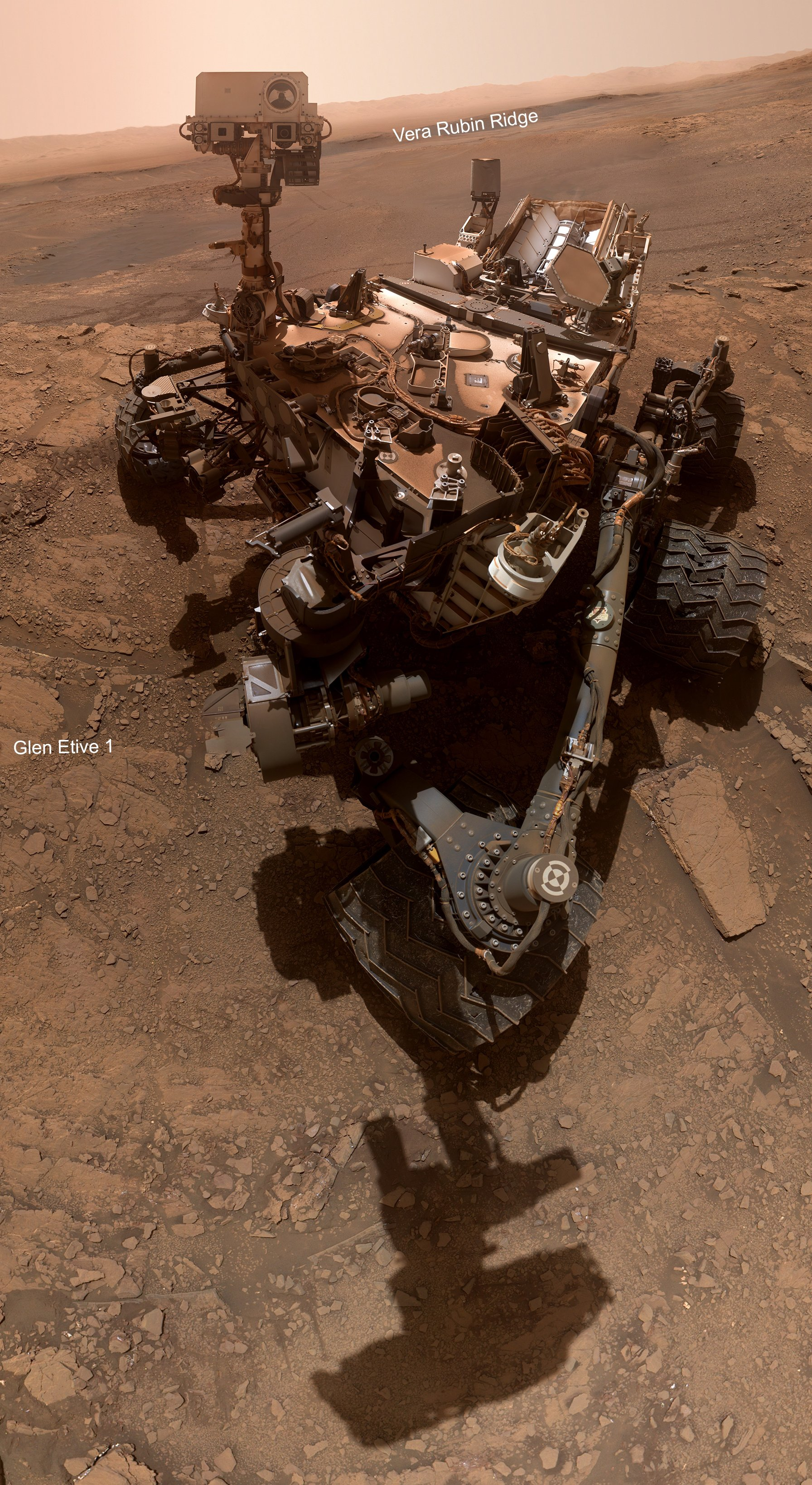
"GlenE"
(Oc2019)

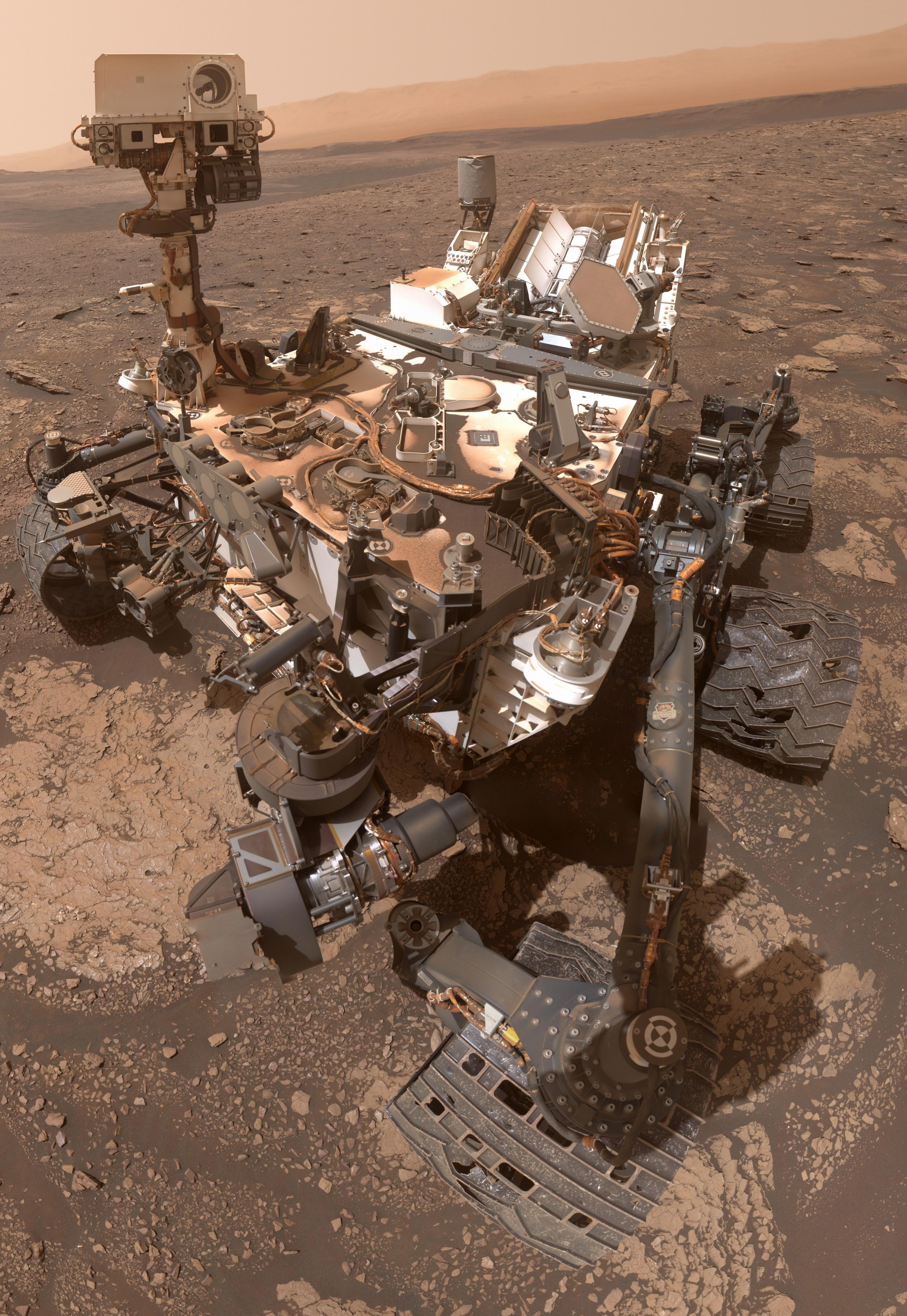
"MaryAnn"
(No2020)

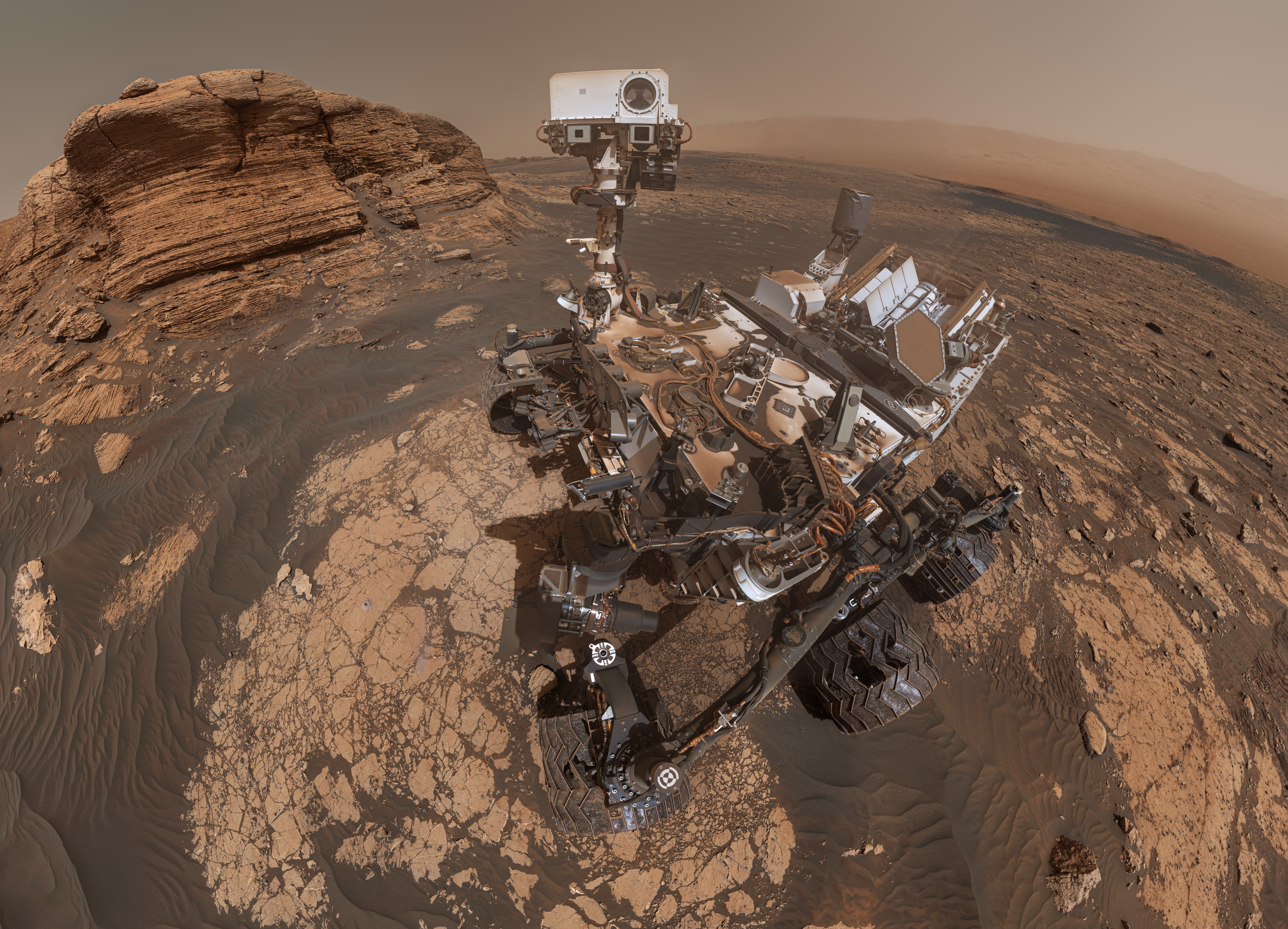
"MtMercou"
(March 2021)

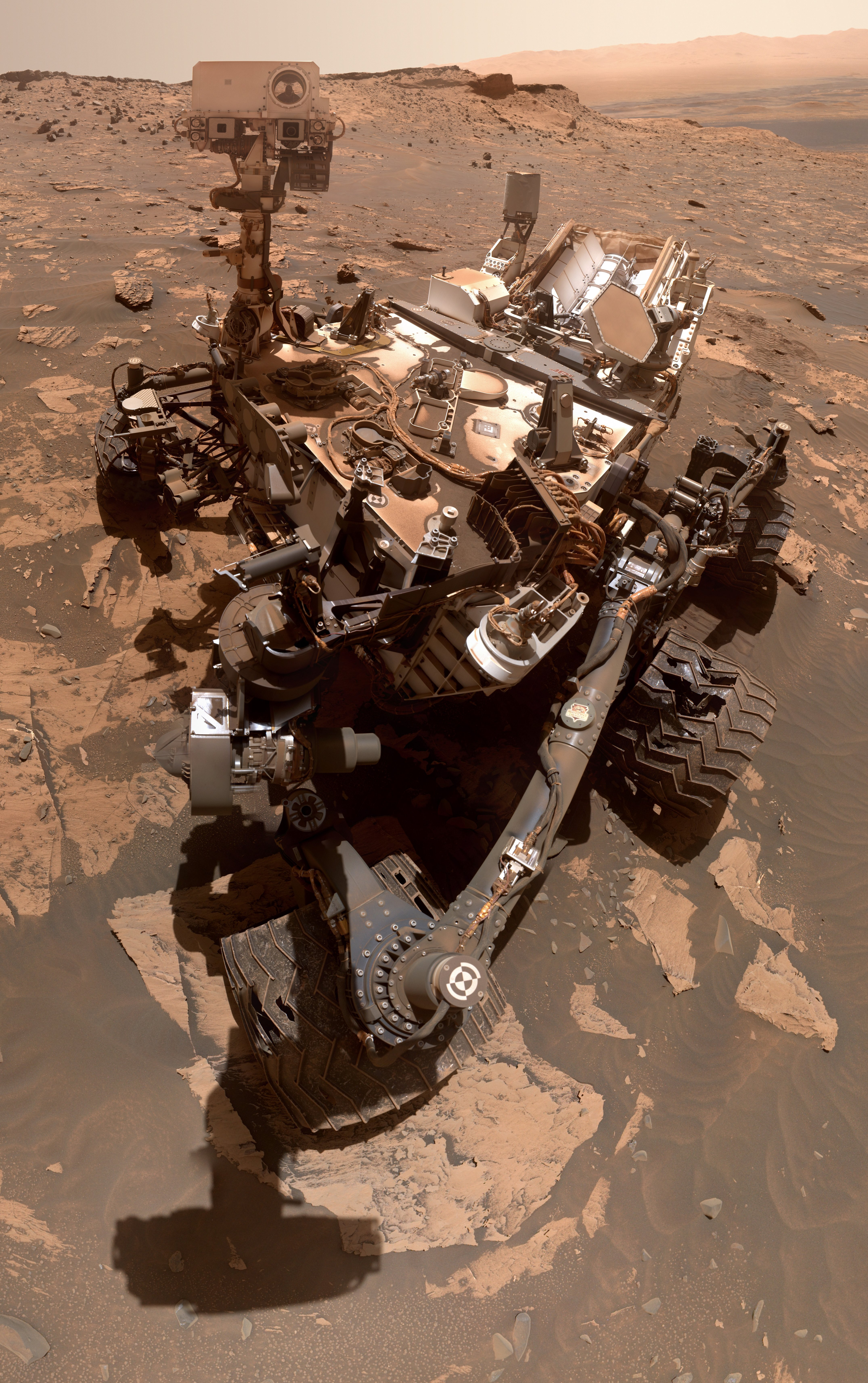
"Greenh"
(No2021)

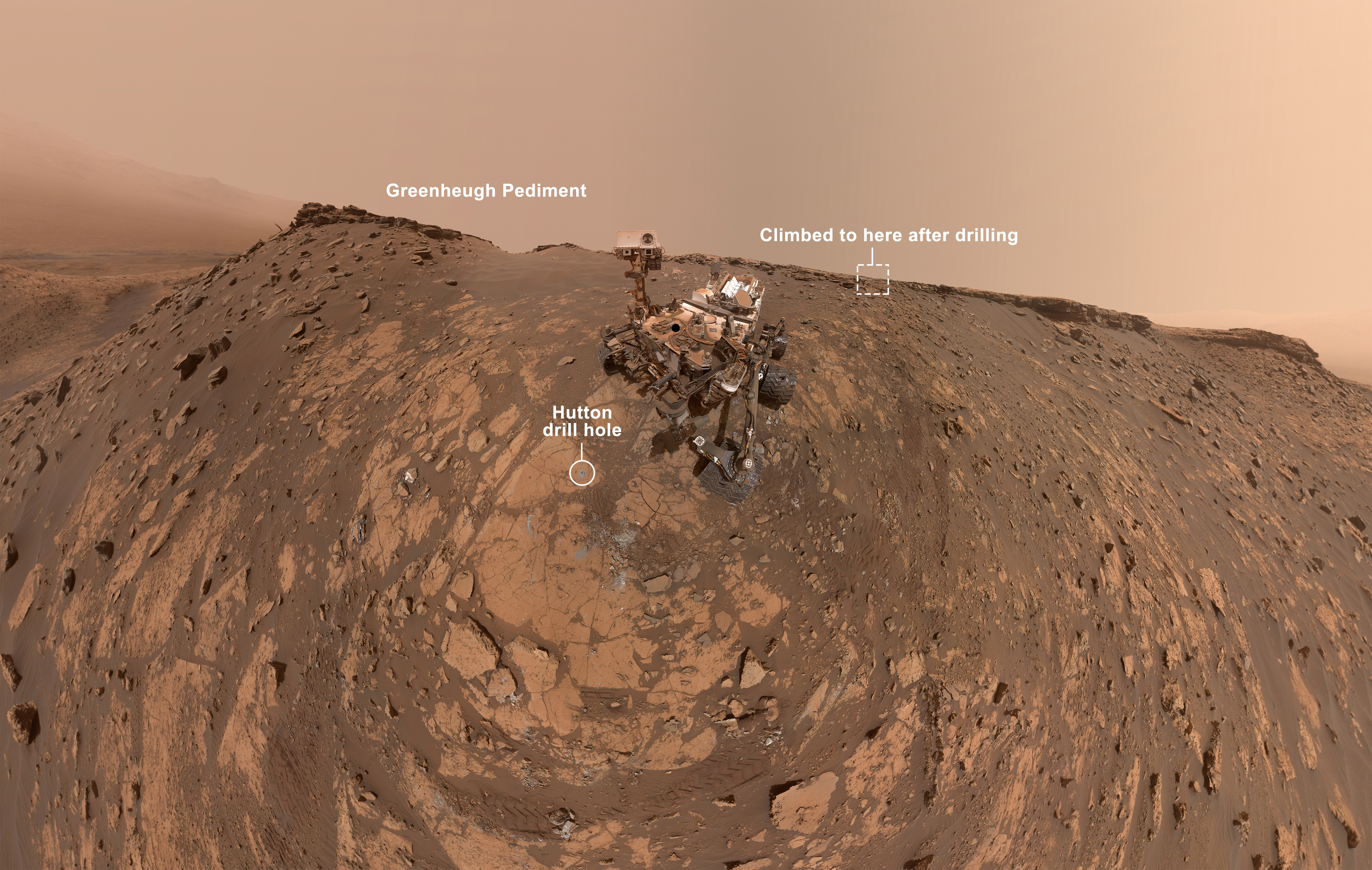
Curiosity rover self-portrait ("Hutton" Drill Site; 26 February 2020)

== Holes Drilled ==
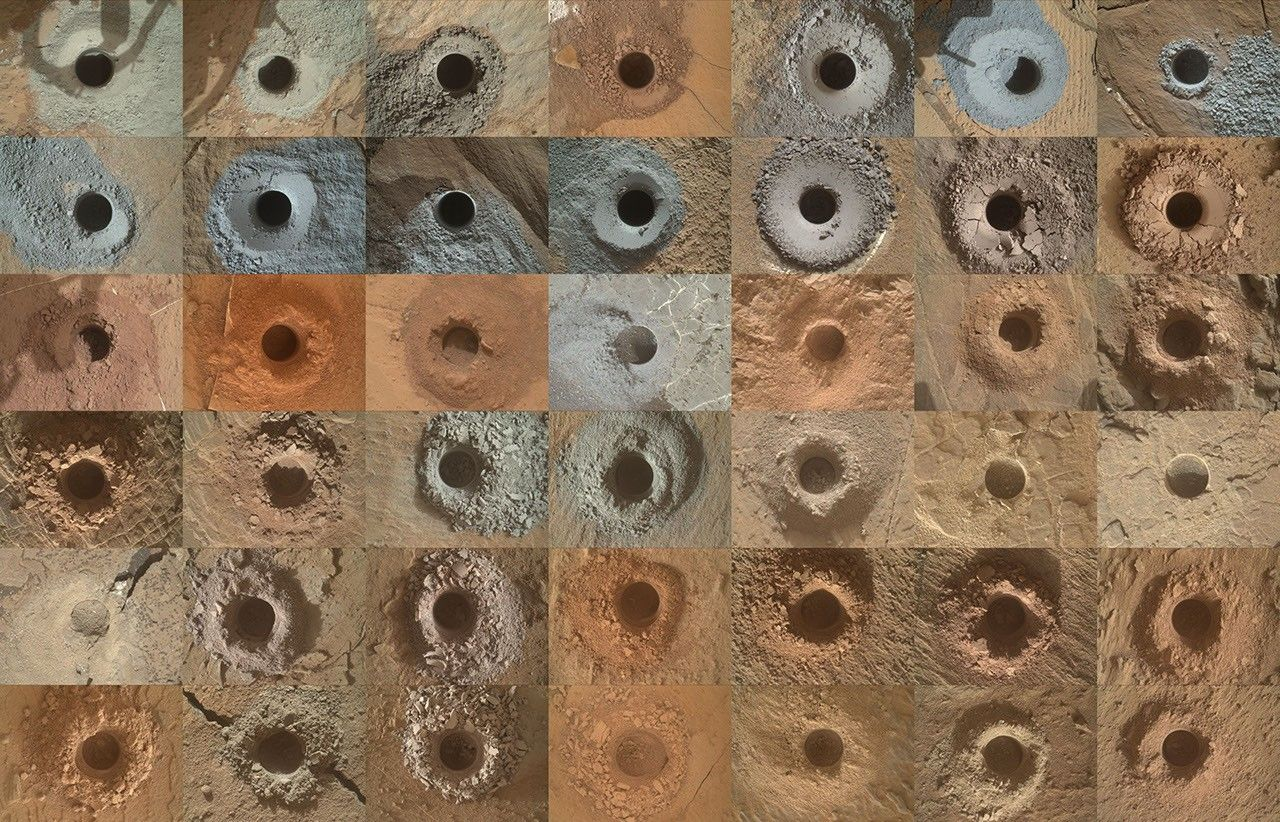
Curiosity's 42 drilled holes as of 2025

== See also ==
- Aeolis quadrangle
- Astrobiology
- Composition of Mars
- ExoMars programme
- Exploration of Mars
- Geography of Mars
- Geology of Mars
- InSight lander
- Life on Mars
- List of missions to Mars
- List of rocks on Mars
- Mars Exploration Rover
- Mars Express orbiter
- Mars Odyssey Orbiter
- Mars Orbiter Mission
- Mars Pathfinder (Sojourner rover)
- Mars Reconnaissance Orbiter
- Mars 2020 rover mission
- MAVEN orbiter
- Moons of Mars
- Phoenix lander
- Robotic spacecraft
- Scientific information from the Mars Exploration Rover mission
- Space exploration
- Timeline of Mars 2020
- U.S. Space Exploration History on U.S. Stamps
- Viking program
- Water on Mars
