= Nora (name) =

- Pronunciation: /ˈnɔːrə/ NOR-ə
- Gender: Female

Origin
- Origin: from Norman, in turn from Latin
- Meaning: "honor"
- Region of origin: Europe

Other names
- Related names: Noora, Noorah, Norma, Eleonora, Eleanor, Norabelle, Nura, Leonora, Honour, Honora, Honorata, Honoria, Annora, Honor

Nora or Norah is a feminine given name. It mainly originates as a short form of Honora (also Honoria), a common Anglo-Norman name, ultimately derived from the Latin word Honor (with that meaning). In Hungary, the name Nóra originates as a short form of Eleonóra.

The Irish Nóra is likewise probably an Irish form of Honora. A diminutive form of Nóra is Nóirín; this name has numerous anglicised forms, such as: Norene and Norine.

Nora has been among the most popular girl names in Norway in the 2000s, topping the list of most popular girl names in 2012.

In Finnish and Arabic there is a given name Noora.

"Bloody Nora", "ruddy Nora" or "flaming Nora" is a British minced oath, not named after any real individual.

== People ==
Notable people with the name include:

- Nora Abolins (born 1992), Canadian-born Latvian football player
- Nora Aceval (born 1953), Algerian writer
- Nora Achahbar (born 1982), Dutch politician and jurist
- Nora Adamian (1910–1992), Soviet-Armenian writer
- Nora Ahlberg (born 1952), Norwegian psychologist
- Norah Aiton, British architect
- Norah Al Faiz (born 1956), Saudi deputy education minister
- Nora Al Matrooshi (born 1993), Emirati astronaut
- Nora Lilian Alcock (1874–1972), British pioneering plant pathologist
- Norah Amsellem, French opera singer
- Norah Ansell (1906–1990), British artist
- Nora Ariffin, Singaporean fashion model and real estate broker
- Nora Armani (born 1956), Egyptian play director
- Nora Arnezeder (born 1989), French actress and singer
- Nora Ashe (1882–1970), Irish teacher, nationalist and Irish language activist
- Nora Aslan (born 1937), Argentine visual artist and photographer
- Nora Astorga (1944–1988), Nicaraguan guerilla, politician, judge, Vice Minister of Justice and ambassador to the United Nations (1986–1988)
- Nora Attal (born 1999), British fashion model
- Nora Aunor (1953–2025), Filipina actress
- Nora Awolowo (born 1999), Nigerian film director, cinematographer, documentary photographer, producer and creative director
- Nora Azmy (born 2000), Egyptian synchronized swimmer
- Nora Azurmendi (born 1995), Spanish handballer
- Nora Bajčíková (1966–2014), Slovak tennis player
- Nora Baldenweg (born 1981), Swiss/Australian female composer
- Norah Balls (1886–1980), British suffragette, women's rights campaigner, magistrate, councillor.
- Norah Baring (1905–1985), English actress
- Nora Barlow (1885–1989), British botanist and geneticist
- Norah Barlow, New Zealand business executive
- Nora Barnacle (1884–1951), wife of author James Joyce
- Nora Stanton Barney (1883–1971), British civil engineer and suffragist
- Nora Barrientos (born 1960), Chilean politician
- Nóra Barta (born 1984), Hungarian diver
- Nora Raleigh Baskin (born 1961), American author of books for children and young adults
- Nora Bayes (1880–1928), American singer and vaudeville performer
- Nora Bayrakdarian, Lebanese Professor of Armenian descent
- Norah Beare (born 1946), Northern Ireland politician
- Nora Beloff (1919–1997), English journalist and politician
- Nora Bennis (1940–2019), Irish housewife and politician
- Nora Holstad Berge (born 1987), Norwegian footballer
- Nora von Bergen (born 1990), Swiss ice dancer
- Nora Bernard (1935–2007), Mi'kmaq activist
- Nora Berra (born 1963), French politician
- Nora Berrah, Algerian physicist
- Nora J. Besansky, American molecular biologist
- Nora Beust (1888–1973), American writer
- Nora Aída Bicet (born 1977), Spanish-Cuban javelin thrower
- Norah Bigirwa-Nyendwoha (born 1968), Ugandan politician
- Nora Francisca Blackburne (1914–2009), British casting director and civil servant
- Nora Brooks Blakely (born 1951), American literary editor
- Norah Blaney (1893–1983), British music hall performer
- Nora Blom (born 1951), Dutch tennis player
- Norah Borges (1901–1998), Argentine artist, art critic and member of the Florida group
- Nora Bossong (born 1982), German writer
- Nora Boustany, Lebanese journalist and educator
- Norah Braden (1901–2001), British artisan potter
- Lady Norah Bradley-Birt (1875–1946), British aristocrat
- Nora Brambilla (born 1964), Italian and German theoretical physicist
- Nora Vagi Brash (1944–2024), Papua New Guinean author
- Nora Bretón, Mexican physicist
- Nora Brockstedt (1923–2015), Norwegian singer
- Nora Brownell (born 1947), American businessman
- Nora Brugman (born 1992), Spanish sailor
- Nora Jean Bruso (born 1956), American singer
- Nora Burglon (1896–1976), American author
- Norah Burke (1907–1976), British novelist and writer
- Norah Burnard (1902–1979), New Zealand school dental supervisor and journal editor
- Nora Calderwood (1896–1985), Scottish mathematician and professor
- Nora Callebout (1895–1995), British track athlete
- Nora Campos (born 1966), American politician
- Nora Cano (born 1994), Mexican actress and singer
- Nora Cardoza (born 1984), Mexican boxer
- Norah Carter (1881–1966), New Zealand photographer
- Nora Cecil (1878–1951), English-American actress
- Nora K. Chadwick (1891–1972), British philologist
- Norah Chambers (1905–1989), British prison of war chorale conductor
- Nora Chesson (1871–1906), English journalist and poet
- Nora Chipaumire (born 1965), choreographer and performer
- Nora Clench (1867–1938), Canadian musician
- Nora Stewart Coleman (1920–2005), First Lady of American Samoa
- Nora Collyer (1898–1979), Canadian modernist painter
- Nora Connolly, British actress
- Nora Conway (1920–2010), Irish badminton player
- Nora Cornolle (born 1989), French mixed martial artist
- Nora Cortiñas (1930–2024), Argentine social psychologist, activist, human rights defender
- Nora Coton-Pélagie (born 1988), French footballer
- Nora Cuevas (born 1959), Chilean politician
- Nora Cullen (1905–1990), Argentine actress
- Nora Cundell (1889–1948), English painter
- Nora Daduut (born 1953), Nigerian academic and politician
- Nora Danish (born 1982), Malaysian actress, singer, host and model
- Nora Dannehy (born 1961), American attorney
- Nora Marks Dauenhauer (1927–2017), Tlingit poet, short-story writer and Tlingit language scholar
- Nora David, Baroness David (1913–2009), British politician and life peer
- Nora Fontaine Davidson (1836–1929), American schoolteacher
- Nora Daza (1928–2013), Filipina chef, restaurateur, socio-civic leader, television host and best-selling cookbook author
- Nora Dean (1944–2016), Jamaican singer
- Nora Decter, Canadian author and university instructor
- Norah Demierre (born 2007), Swiss rhythmic gymnast
- Nora Demleitner (born 1966), American law professor
- Nora Denney (1927–2005), American actress
- Nora Dillon (1888–1984), English Girl Guide leader
- Nora Dimitrova (born 1996), Bulgarian footballer
- Norah Docker (1906–1983), English socialite
- Nora Domínguez, Argentine literary scholar
- Nora Dumas (1890–1979), Hungarian photographer
- Nora Dunblane (1879–19??), American actress and writer
- Nora Dunfee (1915–1994), American actress
- Nora Dunn (born 1952), American actress and comedian
- Norah Dunphy, UK architect and town planner
- Nora Eddington (1924–2001), American actress and socialite
- Nóra Edöcsény (born 1974), Hungarian triathlete
- Nora Lie Eghdami (born 1997), Norwegian footballer
- Nora Ekberg, known as Little Sis Nora (born 1996), Swedish singer
- Nora El Koussour (born 1994), Dutch actress
- Norah Elam (1878–1961), Irish-born British suffragette
- Nora England (1946–2022), American linguist
- Nora England (artist), British artist
- Nora Ephron (1941–2012), American writer
- Nóra Érfalvy (born 1970), Hungarian rhythmic gymnast
- Nora Espinoza, republican member of the New Mexico House of Representatives
- Nora Ezell (1917–2007), African-American quilter
- Nora Fatehi (born 1992), Canadian-Moroccan dancer and actress
- Nora Federici (1910–2001), Italian statistician
- Nora Fernandes (born 1998), Indian footballer
- Nora Fernández (born 1999), Spanish artistic gymnast
- Nora Fingscheidt (born 1983), German film director and screenwriter
- Nora Fischer, several people
- Nora FitzGibbon (1889–1979), New Zealand nurse
- Norah Flatley (born 2000), American artistic gymnast
- Nora Kathleen Fletcher (1880–1976), Australian nurse
- Nora Forster (1942–2023), German-British music promoter
- Nora May French (1881–1907), American poet
- Nora Fridrichová (born 1977), Czech television presenter
- Norah Fry, advocate and campaigner
- Norah Fulcher, English watercolor portrait artist
- Nora Gal (1912–1991), Russian translator
- Nora Ruvalcaba Gámez (born 1967), Mexican politician
- Norah Gaughan (born 1961), American hand knitting pattern designer
- Nora Trueblood Gause (1851–1955), American humanitarian
- Norah Geddes, Scottish landscape architect
- Norah Gibbons (1952–2020), Irish children's advocate and social worker
- Nora Giménez (born 1957), Argentine politician
- Nora Ginzburg (born 1949), Argentine lawyer and politician
- Nora Gjakova (born 1992), Kosovo-Albanian judoka, Olympic champion
- Nora Neset Gjøen (born 1992), Norwegian footballer
- Nora Gomringer (born 1980), German and Swiss poet and writer
- Nóra Görbe (born 1956), Hungarian pop singer and actress
- Nora Gordon (1893–1970), British actress
- Nora I. Goreau (1921–2016), Panamanian marine biologist and teacher
- Norah Gorsen (1931–2020), British actress
- Nora Gould, Canadian poet
- Norah Neilson Gray (1882–1931), Scottish artist
- Nora Greenberg (born 1950), Israeli politician and LGBT rights activist
- Nora Gregor (1901–1949), Austrian actress
- Nora Griffith (1870–1937), Scottish Egyptologist and illustrator
- Nora Groce, British anthropologist
- Nora Grossman, American film producer
- Nora Gubisch (born 1971), French operatic mezzo-soprano
- Nora Guinn (1920–2005), American judge
- Nora Gulbrandsen (1894–1978), Norwegian porcelain designer
- Norah Gurdon (1882–1974), Australian painter
- Nora Guthrie (born 1950), American record producer
- Norah Hamilton (1873–1945), USA artist and educator
- Nora Spencer Hamner (1895–1971), American nurse
- Nora Hamzawi (born 1983), French humorist, comedian and actor
- Nora Harkin (1910–2012), Irish republican socialist and activist
- Nora Heald (1882–1961), British journalist and editor
- Nora Hendrix (1883–1984), African-Canadian vaudeville performer
- Nora Heroum (born 1994), Finnish footballer
- Nora Herting, American artist
- Nora Heysen (1911–2003), Australian artist
- Nora Hirano (born 1978), Japanese comedian
- Nóra Hoffmann (born 1985), Hungarian ice dancer
- Norah M. Holland (1876–1925), writer
- Nora Holt (1885–1974), American critic, composer, singer and pianist
- Nora Hood (c. 1836–1871), Aboriginal Australian religious figure
- Nora Houfová (1924–2024), Austrian actress
- Norah Hoult (1898–1984), Irish writer
- Nora Houston (1883–1942), American painter
- Norah Howard (1900–1968), British actress
- Nora Hsiung Chu, Chinese educator
- Nora Ikstena (1969–2026), Latvian writer and cultural manager
- Nora Illi (1984–2020), Swiss Muslim activist
- Norah Isaac (1914–2003), Welsh author and advocate
- Nora Istrefi (born 1986), Kosovo-Albanian singer
- Nora Iuga (born 1931), Romanian poet, writer and translator
- Nora Ivanova (born 1977), Austrian sprinter
- Nora Foss al-Jabri (born 1996), Norwegian singer
- Nora Jacobson, American filmmaker
- Norah C. James (1896–1979), English novelist
- Nora Jenčušová (born 2002), Slovak road cyclist
- N. K. Jemisin (born 1972), American science fiction and fantasy writer
- Norah Jeruto (born 1995), Kenyan steeplechase runner
- Nora Johnson (1933–2017), American novelist
- Nora Johnston, English carillonneur and inventor
- Norah Jones (born 1979), American singer
- Nora Junco, Spanish politician
- Nora Kaye (1920–1987), American ballet dancer and choreographer
- Nora Okja Keller (born 1966), Korean-American author
- Nora Kelly, several people
- Nora Kerin (1881–1970), British theatre actress and stage beauty
- Nora Khan (born 1983), American art critic, curator and writer
- Nora Kirkpatrick (born 1984), American actress
- Nora Köppel (born 1972), Argentine weightlifter
- Nora Kovach (1931–2009), Hungarian ballerina
- Nora Krug, German-American author and illustrator
- Nora Benjamin Kubie (1899–1988), American writer, artist and amateur archaeologist
- Nora Lafi, French historian
- Nora Lam (1932–2004), Chinese minister
- Nora Lane (1905–1948), American actress
- Norah Lange (1905–1972), Argentine author
- Nora de Leeuw, Welsh computational chemist
- Nora Levin (1916–1989), American historian
- Princess Nora of Liechtenstein (born 1950), Liechtenstein princess
- Nora Lindahl (born 2004), Swedish athlete
- Norah Lindsay (1873–1948), British socialite and garden designer
- Nora Listach (1910–1987), American baseball player
- Nora Lofts (1904–1983), British writer
- Nora Bustamante Luciani (1924–2012), Venezuelan physician, historian, writer and intellectual
- Norah Lunkuse (born 1998), Ugandan netball player
- Nora Lustig (born 1951), American economist
- Nora Hamou Maamar (born 1983), French-Algerian footballer
- Nora MacMunn (1875–1967), British geography educator
- Norah Magero (born 1988), Kenyan mechanical engineer and renewable energy expert
- Nora Magid, Canadian-American writer
- Norah Mahlangu (born 1973), South African politician
- Nora Mandray, French filmmaker
- Nora Margaret Manella (born 1951), American judge
- Nora Marlowe (1915–1977), American actress
- Norah Martin, Australian religious sister and the superior general of the Little Company of Mary
- Norah McCarthy, Canadian figure skater
- Norah McClintock (1952–2017), Canadian writer
- Nora McDermott (1927–2013), Canadian basketball and volleyball player, coach and physical education teacher
- Norah McGuinness (1901–1980), Irish artist
- Nora McInerny, American author
- Nora Fisher McMillan (1908–2003), Irish chronologist, naturalist, botanist and museum curator
- Norah Meade (1888–1954), Irish journalist and humanitarian
- Nora Mebarek (born 1972), French politician
- Nóra Medvegy (born 1977), Hungarian chess player
- Nora Meister (born 2003), Swiss Paralympic swimmer
- Nora Gúnera de Melgar (1942–2021), Honduran politician
- Nora Méndez (born 1969), Salvadoran poet
- Nora Chapa Mendoza (born 1932), American painter
- Nora Miao (born 1952), Hong Kong actress
- Norah Michener (1902–1987), Canadian politician
- Norah Milanesi (born 2003), Cameroonian swimmer
- Nora Miller (1898–1994), Scottish zoologist
- Nora Milnes (1882–1972), British social worker, educator and author
- Nora Mitrani, Bulgarian writer
- Nora Mohler (1898–1984), American physicist
- Nora Monie (born 1997), Cameroonian athlete
- Norah Montgomerie (1909–1998), British folklorist, illustrator and writer
- Nora Mørk (born 1991), Norwegian handball player
- Nora Naranjo Morse, Native American artist and poet
- Norah Munsu (born 1960), Namibian politician
- Nora Nadjarian, Armenian-Cypriot poet and short story writer
- Nóra Nagy-Bujdosó (born 1985), Hungarian basketball player
- Norah Nelson Napaljarri (born 1956), Australian artist
- Nora Andy Napaltjarri, Australian artist
- Nora Nash, activist
- Nora Navas (born 1975), Spanish actress
- Nora Neve, British nurse and medical missionary
- Nora Newcombe (born 1951), Canadian psychologist
- Nora Ney (actress) (1906–2003), Polish film actress
- Nora Ney (1922–2003), Brazilian singer
- Nora Nicholson (1892–1973), British actress
- Nora Noffke, American geo-biologist
- Nora-Jane Noone (born 1984), Irish actress
- Nora Norrish, English table tennis player
- Nora Nouhaili (born 2003), Tunisian footballer
- Nora Nova (1928–2022), Bulgarian-born singer
- Nora Novotny (born 1939), Austrian swimmer
- Nora Connolly O'Brien (1892–1981), Irish politician, activist and writer
- Nora O'Connor (born 1968), American Chicago-based musician
- Nora O'Daly, Irish nationalist, writer and trade unionist
- Norah O'Donnell (born 1974), American journalist
- Nora O'Keeffe, Irish revolutionary and feminist
- Norah Olembo (1941–2021), Kenyan biochemist and policy developer
- Nora Tynan O'Mahony (1866–1954), Irish poet and novelist
- Norah O'Neill (1949–2017), American aviator
- Nora Orlandi (1933–2025), Italian musician and composer
- Nora Owen (born 1945), Irish politician and television presenter
- Norah Patten, Irish aeronautical engineer
- Nora Payne, American singer songwriter
- Norah Lillian Penston (1903–1974), British botanist and academic administrator
- Nora Pierce, American author and academic
- Nora Perry, several people
- Nora Persson (born 1999), Norwegian handball player
- Norah Phillips, Baroness Phillips (1910–1992), British labour politician
- Nora Polley (1894–1988), Indian tennis player
- Nora Poppelwell, former mayoress of Gore
- Nora Pouillon (born 1943), Austrian-American chef and restaurateur
- Nora Pöyhönen (1849–1938), Finnish horticulturist and educator
- Nora En Pure (born 1990), Swiss South African DJ and record producer
- Nora Radcliffe (born 1946), Scottish politician
- Norah Abdul Rahman (born 1958), Malaysian politician
- Nora Reiche (born 1983), German handball player
- Nora Renouf, British pharmaceutical chemist
- Nora Ricci (1924–1976), Italian actress
- Norah Richards (1876–1971), Irish actress and playwright
- Nora Rinne (born 1973), Finnish actress
- Nora Rios (born 1999), Swedish actress
- Nora Roberts (born 1950), American author
- Nora Rocha (born 1967), Mexican long-distance runner
- Nora Rodd (1893–1994), Canadian peace activist
- Nora Tausz Rónai (born 1924), Brazilian holocaust survivor, architect, writer and masters swimmer
- Nora Ross, American trap shooting champion
- Nora Rubashova (1909–1987), Russian Catholic nun
- Norah Runge (1884–1978), British politician
- Nora St. Rose, Trinidadian cricketer
- Nora Salinas (born 1976), Mexican actress
- Nora Samosir, Singaporean actress
- Nora Sanderson (1905–1975), New Zealand romance novelist
- Nora Sayre (1932–2001), American film critic
- Nora Cate Schaeffer, American sociologist and survey statistician
- Nora Schimming-Chase (1940–2018), Namibian politician
- Norah Schuster (1892–1991), British pathologist
- Nora E. Scott (1905–1994), American Egyptologist
- Nora Seitz (born 1984), German politician
- Nora Shanab (born 1987), Israeli footballer
- Nóra Ní Shíndile, Irish singer
- Nóra Simóka (born 1980), Hungarian modern pentathlete
- Nora Simonhjell, Norwegian literary scholar
- Norah Simpson (1895–1974), Australian artist
- Nora Sipos (1900–1988), New Zealand businesswoman, humanitarian and welfare worker
- Nora Slawik (born 1962), American politician
- Norah Smallwood (1909–1984), British publisher
- Nora Smith, several people
- Norah Smyth (1874–1963), British suffragette, photographer and socialist activist
- Nora Somoza (1930–2013), Argentine tennis player
- Nora Sopková, Czech set decorator
- Nora Stapleton (born 1983), Irish rugby union footballer
- Norah Dowell Stearns (1891–1954), American hydrogeologist
- Nora Sterry (1879–1941), American teacher and academic
- Nora Stiasny (1898–1942), Austrian Jewish art collector
- Norah Sharpe Stone (1938–2019), Canadian-born American philanthropist, vintner and collector
- Norah Stoner (born 1945), Canadian politician
- Norah Story (1902–1978), Canadian archivist
- Nora Strømstad (1909–2005), Norwegian alpine skier
- Nora Jane Struthers (born 1983), American singer-songwriter
- Nora Subschinski (born 1988), German diver
- Nora Sumberg, Australian artist
- Nora Sun (1937–2011), American diplomat
- Nora Sundberg (born 2005), Swedish golfer
- Nora Sveaass (born 1949), Norwegian psychologist
- Nora Swinburne (1902–2000), British actress
- Nora Tallus (born 1981), Finnish ice hockey player
- Nora Torulf (1903–1993), Swedish author and politician
- Nora Tschirner (born 1981), German actress
- Nora Turato, Croatian artist
- Nora Twomey (born 1971), Irish animator, director, screenwriter, producer and voice actress
- Nora W. Tyson (born 1956), US Navy admiral
- Nora Valdez (born 1997), Colombian archer
- Nora Valsami (born 1948), Greek actress
- Nora Vargas, American politician
- Nóra Varsányi (born 1991), Hungarian handball player
- Nora Vasconcellos, American skateboarder
- Nora Veryán (1929–1998), Mexican actress
- Norah Vincent (1968–2022), American writer
- Nora Volkow (born 1956), Mexican psychiatrist
- Nora Vynne (1857–1914), British novelist and political activist
- Nora Wagener (born 1989), Luxembourgish writer
- Nora Waldstätten (born 1981), Austrian actress
- Nora Wall, Irish Sisters of Mercy member
- Nora Waln (1895–1964), American writer
- Nora Watkins (1957–2023), New Zealand former footballer
- Nora Wattie (1900–1994), Scottish public health medicine and ante-natal pioneer
- Norah Weinstein, co-CEO of Baby2Baby
- Nora Kate Weston (1880–1965), Australian cabinet-maker
- Nora Wilhelm (born 1993), Swiss activist and social entrepreneur
- Norah Wilson (1901–1971), Australian Aboriginal community worker
- Nora Xu (born 1995), Chinese model
- Nora Young, Canadian broadcaster and writer
- Nora Young (cyclist) (1917–2016), Canadian cyclist
- Nora Yú (born 1954), Mexican politician
- Nora Zaïdi (born 1965), former Member of the European Parliament
- Nora Zehetner (born 1981), American actress
- Nora Zuckerman, American television screenwriter

== Fictional characters ==
- Nora from the video game Fields of Mistria
- Nora from the anime Noragami
- Nora from the film Pete's Dragon
- Nora, character from the anime Witchblade
- Nora Allen from The Flash comic books
- Nora Allen (The Flash), Barry Allen's mother in the TV series The Flash
- Nora West-Allen, Barry and Iris' daughter in the TV series The Flash
- Nora Arendt in Spice and Wolf
- Nora the Arctic Fox Fairy, from the British book series Rainbow Magic (originally published as Anna the Arctic Fox Fairy)
- Nora from Cytus II
- Nora Baker, eldest daughter of 'The Bakers' in the film Cheaper by the Dozen
- Nora Batty, character on the British television series Last of the Summer Wine
- Nora Beady, character from the Barnyard franchise
- Nora Bing, character in Friends
- Nora Braverman, character in the Parenthood TV series
- Nora Charles, character in the Dashiell Hammett novel, The Thin Man
- Nora Carpenter, character in Final Destination 2
- Nora Clitheroe, from the play The Plough and the Stars
- Nora Darhk, character in Arrow and Legends of Tomorrow
- Nora Dershlit, a character from iCarly
- Nora Durst, a character from the American television series The Leftovers
- Nora Estheim, character in the video game Final Fantasy XIII
- Nora Fanshaw, in Marriage Story
- Nora Fries, character in DC Comics
- Nora Gainesborough, a character from True Blood
- Nora Grey, character in the Hush, Hush series of books by Becca Fitzpatrick
- Nora Hanen, character on the American television series One Life to Live
- Nora Harris, character in the video game The Last of Us Part II
  - Nora, character in the television series The Last of Us
- Nora Helmer, character in A Doll's House by Henrik Ibsen
- Nora Holleran, character from the book and film Red, White & Royal Blue
- Nora of Kelmendi, legendary character in the Albanian folklore
- Nora Krank, a character in the film Christmas with the Kranks
- Nora Lewin, character on the American television series Law & Order
- Nora Mae Edwards, character in the movie Graverobbers
- Nora Reid, character on the television series The Wilds
- Noora Amalie Sætre, character in Norwegian TV show SKAM
- Nora Singh, character in the TV series The Muppets Mayhem
- Norah Stoakes, character in the Canadian young adult novel The Sky Is Falling
- Nora Thunderman, character in the TV show The Thundermans
- Nora Valkyrie from the animated web series RWBY
- Nora Wakeman, character in My Life as a Teenage Robot
- Nora Walker, a character in the Netflix series 13 Reasons Why
- Nora Walker, character on the American television series Brothers & Sisters

== Animals ==
- Nora (2004–2024), a cat known for playing piano
- Nora (born 2015), a polar bear at the Oregon Zoo
