= Honor (given name) =

Other names
- Related names: Honour, Honora, Honorata, Honoria, Annora, Nora

Honor is a primarily feminine given name derived from the word "honour", taken from a Latin root word honos, honoris. It was a virtue name in use by the Puritans. It is still in occasional use in England, but is an extremely rare name in the United States, where it has never ranked among the top 1,000 names for girls or boys.

== Variants ==
- Annora (Irish)
- Hanora (Irish)
- Honora (English), (Irish)
- Onorata (Italian)
- Honorata (Polish)
- Honoré (boy) (French)
- Honorée (girl) (French)
- Honorina (Filipino)
- Honorine (French)
- Honour (English)
- Nora (English), (Irish)
- Onóra (Irish)
- Onur (Turkish)
- Onur (Azerbaijani)

== People named Honor ==
- Honor Blackman (1925–2020), English actress
- Honor Cargill-Martin (born 1998), English classicist and author
- Honor Carter (born 1982), field hockey player from New Zealand
- Honor Crowley (1903–1966), Irish politician
- Honor Fell (1900–1986), English biologist and zoologist
- Honor Ford-Smith (born 1951), Jamaican actress, playwright, scholar, and poet
- Honor Fraser (born 1974), Scottish art dealer and former model
- Honor Grenville (c. 1494–1566) a Cornish Lady whose domestic life from 1533 to 1540 during the reign of King Henry VIII is exceptionally well-recorded, due to the survival of the Lisle Papers in the National Archives, the state archives of the UK.
- Honor Harger (born 1975), curator and artist from New Zealand
- Honor Jackson (born 1948), American football player
- Honor Kneafsey (born 2004), British actress
- Honor McKellar (1920–2024), New Zealand mezzo-soprano opera singer and singing teacher
- Honor Moore (born 1945), American writer of poetry, creative nonfiction and plays
- Honor Salmon (née Pitman) (1912–1943), British pilot in the Air Transport Auxiliary during World War Two, one of fifteen women pilots who lost their lives flying in the ATA
- Honor Smith (1908–1995), English neurologist
- Honor Swinton Byrne (born 1997), Scottish actress
- Honor Titus (born 1989), American multi-disciplinary artist and musician
- Honor Tracy (1913–1989), English writer
- Honor Marie Warren (born 2008), daughter of Jessica Alba
- Honor Wyatt (1910–1998), English journalist and radio presenter

== People named Honorata ==
- Honorata of Pavia (died 500), Christian saint
- Honorata Górna (born 1968), Polish ice dancer
- Honorata Kucharska (born 2002), Polish Woman FIDE Master
- Honorata Marcińczak (1930–2022), Polish gymnast
- Honorata Skarbek (born 1992), Polish professional singer, songwriter and fashion blogger

== People named Honour ==
- Honour Gombami (born 1983), Zimbabwean football player

== Fictional characters ==
- Honour Chen-Williams, a fictional character from the British soap opera Hollyoaks.
- Honor Harrington, a fictional character from the Honor Harrington book series.
- Honor Huntzberger, a fictional character from the television series Gilmore Girls.
- Honor Klein, a fictional character from the novel A Severed Head by Iris Murdoch.
- Honorata, a fictional character from Ryse: Son of Rome video game.
