= American Artist =

American Artist can refer to:

- American Artist (artist), a new media artist
- American Artist, a sibling publication of The Artist's Magazine
