= Honora =

Honora may refer to:

- Honora (moth), a genus of snout moths
- Honora, Ontario, a community in Northeastern Manitoulin and the Islands, Canada
- Honora (album), a 2026 album by Red Hot Chili Peppers bassist Flea

== People with the given name ==
- Honora Burke (c. 1675 – 1698), Irish aristocrat
- Honora Denny (died 1614), English courtier
- Honora Enfield (1882–1935), British co-operative activist
- Honora Jenkins, English woman who was part of a 1778 case in English law
- Jane Toppan (born Honora Kelley; 1854–1938), American serial killer and poisoner
- Honora Ornstein (1882–1975), one of the Americans known as Diamond Tooth Lil
- Honora Seymour, Lady Beauchamp (fl. 16th c.), English noblewoman, wife of Edward Seymour
- Honora Seymour (bef. 1594–1620), English noblewoman, wife of Ferdinando Sutton
- Honora Sneyd (1751–1780), English writer
- Kathleen Honora Greatorex (1851–1942), American painter and illustrator

== See also ==
- Onora, a given name
- Honorah Parker
- Honoria (disambiguation)
- Honor (given name)
