= Norma (given name) =

- Pronunciation: /ˈnɔːrmə/ NOR-mə
- Gender: Female

Origin
- Meaning: "precepts", "Norsewoman", "Norn"

Other names
- Related names: Nora

Norma is a female name. It is of Germanic and Romance origin.

A single instance of the name Norma is recorded 1203, where it perhaps derives from the Latin word norma, meaning "precept". The name's general usage seems to be subsequent to the 1831 debut of Vincenzo Bellini's opera Norma whose librettist Felice Romani borrowed the name (and the plot) from the recent tragedy Norma by Alexandre Soumet. Soumet's choice of name for his title character may possibly have been influenced by the name of the Germanic mythological Norns.

The name has fluctuated in popularity over the past 100 years. It is still a very common name in the United States, but the name was most often given to babies in the 1930s, and is now seldom given. More recently Norma has been used as a female equivalent of the name Norman, meaning "Norseman".

== Notable people named Norma ==
- Norma Alarcón (born 1943), Chicana author and publisher in the United States
- Norma Aleandro (born 1936), an Argentine actress
- Norma Alvares, Indian lawyer, social worker and environmental activist
- Norma Amezcua (born 1953) is a Mexican former butterfly, freestyle and medley swimmer
- Norma Andrade, founding member of Mexican non-profit association Nuestras Hijas de Regreso a Casa A.C.
- Norma Andrews, cell biologist and professor
- Norma Argentina (born 1948), Argentine actress
- Norma Ashby (born 1935), television broadcaster
- Norma Jean Baker (born June 1, 1926), born Norma Jean Baker, later changed name to Marylin Monroe
- Norma Chick, New Zealand professor of nursing and midwifery
- Norma Cole (born 1945), a visual artist, translator and American poet
- Norma Moreno Figueroa (1962–1986), Mexican journalist
- Norma Foley (born 1970), Irish politician
- Norma Gyle (born 1942), American politician
- Norma Angélica Ladrón de Guevara (1937–1962), Mexican actress
- Norma Hernandez (born 1990/91), American politician
- Norma Huembes (born 1998), Nicaraguan model, public accountant, and beauty pageant titleholder
- Norma Kamali (born 1945), American fashion designer
- Norma Khouri (born 1970), a Jordanian author
- Norma Klein (1938–1989), an American author
- Norma Kuhling (born 1990), an American actress
- Norma MacMillan (1921–2001), a Canadian voice actress
- Norma Major (born 1942), wife of British Prime Minister John Major
- Norma Abdala de Matarazzo (born 1948), Argentine politician
- Norma Fox Mazer (1931–2009), Jordanian author
- Norma McCorvey (1947–2017), the "Jane Roe" in the "Roe v. Wade" abortion case
- Norma Nolan, a 1962 Miss Universe
- Norma Pujol (born 1988), Catalan politician
- Norma Lizbeth Ramos (2008-2023), Mexican bullying victim
- Norma Shearer (1901–1983), a Canadian-American actress and Hollywood star from 1925 to 1942
- Norma Merrick Sklarek (1926–2012), African-American architect
- Norma Smallwood (1909–1966), a Miss America for 1926
- Norma Stitz, a website entrepreneur and nude model
- Norma Talmadge (1894– 1957), a Hollywood star of the silent era
- Norma Teagarden (1911–1996), American jazz pianist
- Norma Wagner (1928–1998), American civil rights activist
- Norma Waterson (1939–2022), English musician
- Norma Winstone (born 1941), a British jazz singer and musician
- Siti Norma Yaakob (born 1940), Malaysian lawyer and judge
- Norma Yarrow (born 1963), Peruvian politician
- Norma Azucena Rodríguez Zamora, Mexican politician affiliated with the Party of the Democratic Revolution

== Fictional characters ==
- Grammy Norma, a character in the 2012 animated movie The Lorax.
- Norma, a cow villager from the video game series Animal Crossing
- Norma, a minor character from Square's console role-playing game Final Fantasy Mystic Quest
- Norma Arnold, mother of Kevin Arnold in the 1988–1993 television series The Wonder Years
- Norma Bates, a fictional character created by writer Robert Bloch
- Norma Bates, a Passions character
- Norma Cenva, a character from the three prequels to Frank Herbert's Dune novels
- Norma Desmond, a character in the film Sunset Boulevard
- Norma Manders, a character in the 1984 American science fiction horror movie Firestarter
- Norma Natividad, a character in the 2021 video game Psychonauts 2
- Norma Romano, a recurring character in the TV series Orange Is the New Black
- Norma Watson, a character in the novel Carrie by Stephen King and film Carrie (1976)
- Norma Watson, a character in Halloween H20: 20 Years Later, played by Janet Leigh
- Norma Rae Webster, heroine of the film Norma Rae (1979)
- Norma, an NPC seen in Mondstadt, Genshin Impact
- Norma Khan, a character in Dead End: Paranormal Park
- Norma Hollowell, a character in the video game Zenless Zone Zero
