= Yellowknife Bay, Mars =

Geologic formation in Gale Crater on Mars

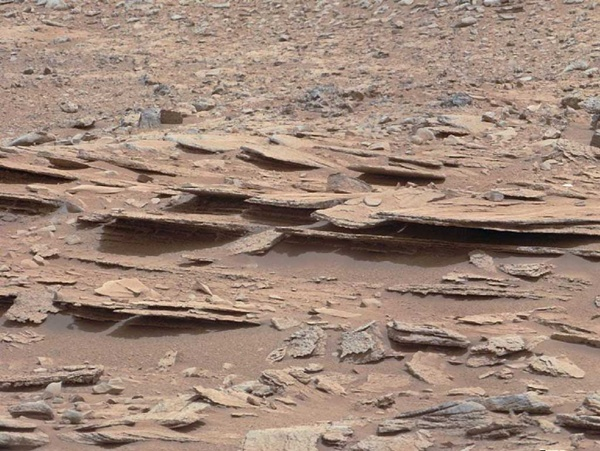
Geologic feature of Yellowknife Bay known as Shaler - the outcrop displays prominent cross-bedding, a feature indicative of water flows

Yellowknife Bay is a geologic formation in Gale Crater on the planet Mars. NASA's Mars Science Laboratory rover, named Curiosity, arrived at the low lying depression on December 17, 2012, 125 sols, or Martian days, into its 668-sol planned mission on the planet. Primary mission goals of the Mars Science Laboratory were to assess the potential habitability of the planet and whether or not the Martian environment is, or has ever been, capable of supporting life.

The site was chosen after much study of the region by previous missions. The Mars Reconnaissance Orbiter observed morphological features created by the presence of liquid water, suggesting the presence of an ancient lake which could have sustained microbial life. The geologic depression takes its name from the city Yellowknife, capital of the Canadian Northwest Territories, in honor of the 4 billion year old rock in the region surrounding the city, which matches the approximate age of the uncovered rock in Gale Crater.

== Gale Crater ==
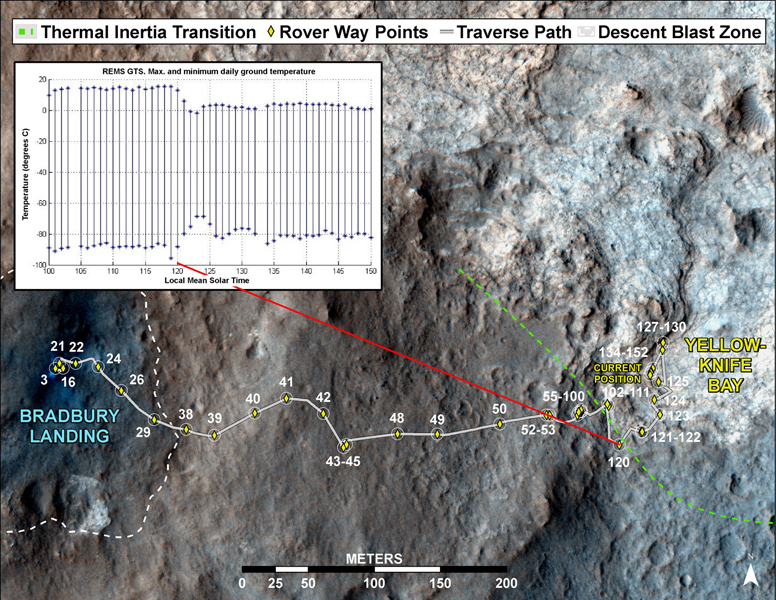
Curiosity's path from Bradbury Landing to Yellowknife Bay and the geologic way-points along the way.

Yellowknife Bay is a 5-meter geologic depression located in the large impact crater known as Gale Crater. The Crater is located on Mars near the northwestern part of the Aeolis quadrangle just south of the planet's equator. The crater's central feature is a 5.5-kilometre-high (18,000 ft) mountain called Aeolis Mons, nicknamed Mount Sharp. Geologic units in the interior of the crater offer a wide range of relative ages of the impact and provide a detailed geologic history of activities within the crater.

Gale Crater is the landing site of the Mars Science Laboratory rover, which was launched from Cape Canaveral on November 26, 2011, and landed at the site designated Bradbury Landing on August 6, 2012. The rover is equipped with a more advanced suite of instruments than has ever landed on an extraterrestrial planet, perfect for assessing the geology of the target regions. From its landing point, Curiosity drove half a kilometer northeast to the low lying depression. A flatter and more lightly colored region than the previous terrain, this region was designated Yellowknife Bay. A top mission priority for the Mars Science Laboratory team was to capture a 360-degree, color panoramic image of this region. This image was then to be used to select drilling locations of the rock samples, John Klein and Cumberland, taken from Yellowknife Bay.

== Habitability ==
Yellowknife Bay - three rock strata: Glenelg Member, Gillespie Lake Member, and Sheepbed Member (Curiosity rover).

Conditions on Mars during its first billion years were dramatically different from the present day. Whether or not the conditions were once habitable depends largely on the volatile content, specifically water (H_{2}O) and carbon dioxide (CO_{2}), of the surface. The greatest source of evidence for the presence of these volatiles comes from observations of surface morphologies. Previous observations of Gale Crater show that the strata exposed at Yellowknife Bay are most likely fan or down slope equivalents, such as lacustrine deposits. Curiosity used its ChemCam and Mastcam instruments to analyze the chemistry and layering of a geological outcrop designated as Shaler. This geologic formation displayed cross-bedding features, clear indicators of past interactions with water flows. Yellowknife Bay was chosen by the Mars Science Laboratory team as the first major site for exploration because the exposed strata was inferred to be a shallow fluvial-lacustrine deposit. These aqueous environments are believed to preserve evidence of paleo-habitability and potentially, Earth-like microorganisms capable of breaking down rocks and minerals for energy, known as chemolithoautotrophs.

Until Curiosity had arrived on Mars, all surface age dating of Mars had been through relative techniques using geomorphology and crater counting methods in order to determine an estimated age of the rock layering. The Mars Science Laboratory team used the rover to collect samples from the mudstone at Yellowknife Bay then, using the mass spectrometer, from the Sample Analysis at Mars (SAM) instrument package measured argon isotopes for an absolute radiometric date of the rock member, and an approximate age of its exposure to the surface. The age of the lake bed rock was dated to 4 billion years old, and exposed by wind erosion between 30 and 110 million years ago, giving us the first absolute age of a rock on another planet. Still, a more ideal location to search for evidence of life on Mars would have been a member exposed more recently, as few as a million years or less, so it could have been better preserved from the harsh surface radiation.

=== Potential evidence of ancient microbes ===
A study by Nora Noffke suggested sandstone beds associated with the Gillespie Lake Member seem similar to microbially induced sedimentary structures (MISS) found on Earth and hypothesised that they may be the result of ancient microbial mats. However the Curiosity science team concluded that the features were non-biological in their origin and were most likely shaped by erosion or abrasion from sand transported in water.

== Yellowknife Bay geology ==
Cross section of three sedimentary beds which compose the Yellowknife Bay formation, as well as drill sites for the John Klein and Cumberland rock samples.

The primary composition of most terrestrial bodies in the Solar System is igneous rock, but it has long been speculated that sedimentary rock exists in great quantity on Mars, as it does on Earth. The Curiosity rover has confirmed the presence of sedimentary rock composed of fine-, medium-, and coarse-grained sandstone basalt. This exposure is about 5.2 m (17 ft) thick and is divided into three unique strata. From bottom to top, these strata have been designated: the Sheepbed Member (1.5 m (4.9 ft) thick), the Gillespie Lake Member (2.0 m (6.6 ft) thick), and the Glenelg Member (1.7 m (5.6 ft) thick); the assemblage of members is known as the Yellowknife Bay formation.

Active erosion, attributed to both aeolian and fluvial events, has caused the Gillespie Lake Member to weather away, revealing the underlying Sheepbed layer and creating a topographic step observable in HiRISE images from the Mars Reconnaissance Orbiter. The Gillespie Lake bed appears massive and is composed of poorly sorted, angular to well-rounded grains, which make up sheetlike sandstone basalt. These characteristics further support a model of fluvial transport and deposition.

It was from the Sheepbed layer that Curiosity took two drilling samples from the mudstone sedimentary rock. These drill samples were named John Klein and Cumberland and were, respectively, the second and third drilling samples Curiosity retrieved from the martian regolith. The first being an eolian deposit, named Rocknest, sampled from an area 60 m (200 ft) to the west of Yellowknife Bay. The two samples were drilled 3 m (9.8 ft) apart and within 10 cm (3.9 in) of the same stratigraphic level.

=== John Klein and Cumberland samples ===
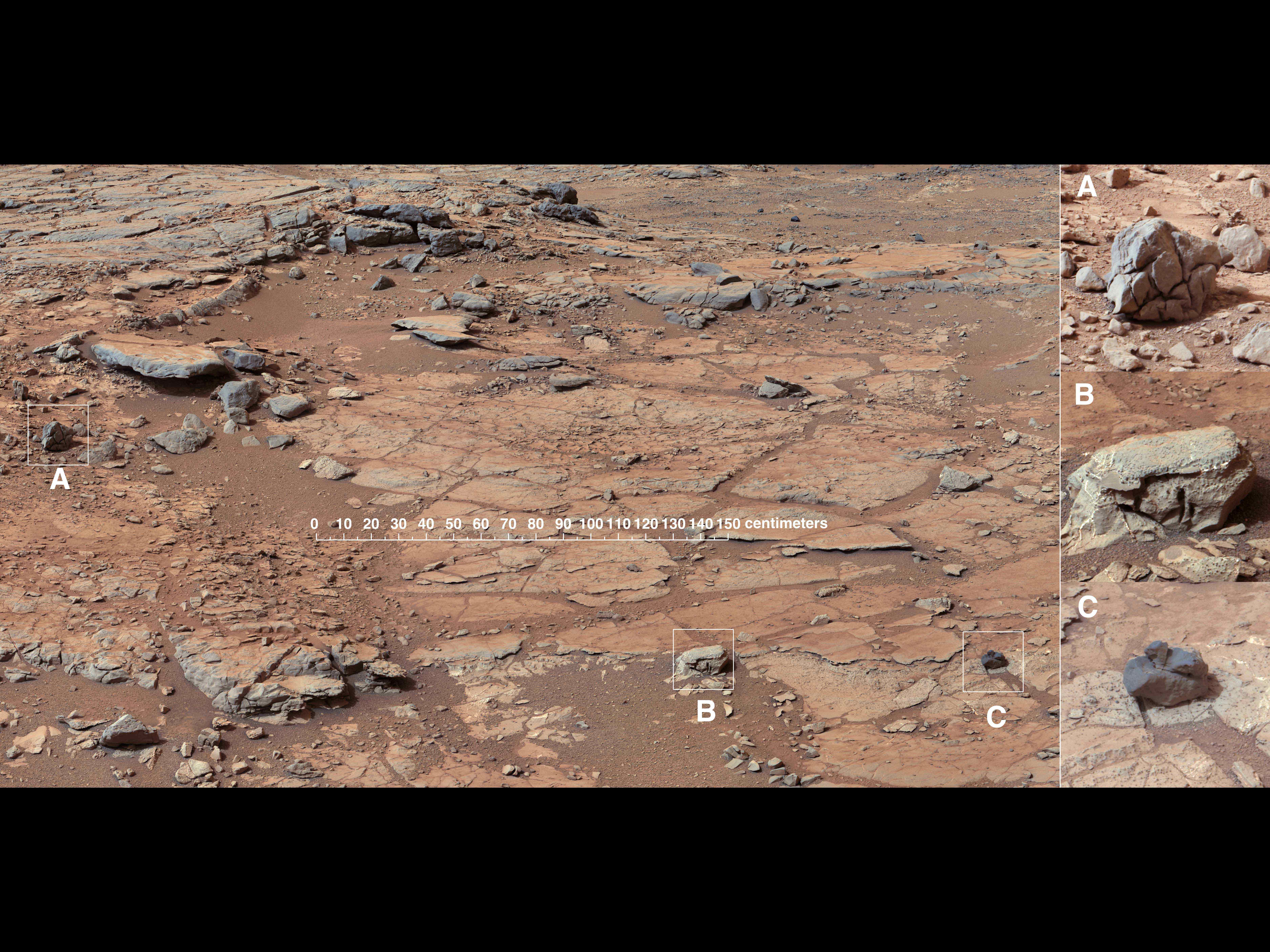
John Klein site chosen for Curiosity's drill sampling.

A number of different instruments were used by Curiosity in attempts to assess the mineralogy of the mudstone sampled from the Sheepbed strata. The CheMin XRD, Mastcam, Chemcam, alpha particle x-ray spectrometer (APXS), and the Mars Hand Lens Imager (MAHLI) were all used to obtain the most complete picture possible of the chemistry and mineralogy of the two samples, which were used to describe the region as a whole.

A large amount of phyllosilicates, clay minerals such as smectite, were found to be major constituents in the two samples. Clay minerals are hydrous aluminum phyllosillicates and form only in the presence of water, further supporting the claim that an ancient crater lake once existed in this region. Other silicates were detected as well, such as the magnesium-rich end-member of olivine called forsterite, pigeonite, plagioclase, augite, clinopyroxene, and orthopyroxene. These detected minerals are all indicative of a potential mafic source for the origin of the deposition.

== After Yellowknife Bay ==
With the Mars Science Laboratory's primary goal of establishing whether a habitable paleo-environment could have existed on Mars accomplished while within Yellowknife Bay, the team of NASA scientists then directed Curiosity out of the Yellowknife Bay formation and toward the original destination of Mount Sharp, which rises 5.5 km (3.4 mi) from the base of Gale Crater. On July 4, 2013, Curiosity drove away from the Glenelg Member and began its 8.0 km (5 mi) journey to Mount Sharp. ASA scientists estimated this drive would take the rover a year to complete.
