= Dunipace =

Coordinates: 56.028°N 03.914°W

Dunipace: Scottish Gaelic: Dùn a' Phais
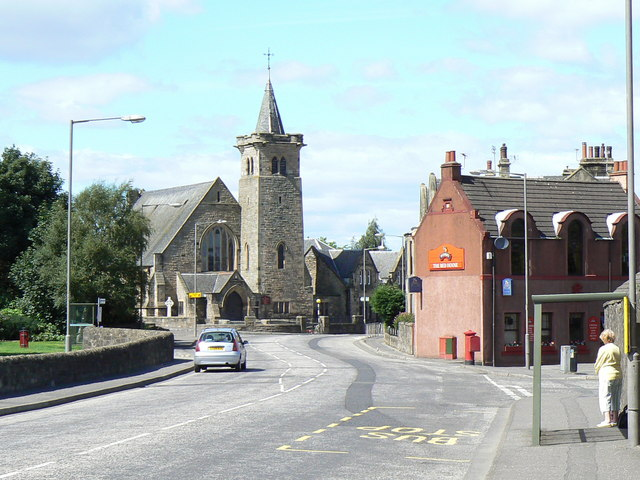
- Dunipace Church

- Location within the Falkirk council area
- Area: 0.24 sq mi (0.62 km^{2})
- Population: 2,460 (2020)
  - Density: 10,250/sq mi (3,960/km^{2})
- OS grid reference: NS807833
  - Edinburgh: 28.6 mi (46.0 km) ESE
  - London: 349 mi (562 km) SSE
- Council area: Falkirk
- Lieutenancy area: Stirling and Falkirk
- Country: Scotland
- Sovereign state: United Kingdom
- Post town: DENNY
- Postcode district: FK6
- Dialling code: 01324
- Police: Scotland
- Fire: Scottish
- Ambulance: Scottish
- UK Parliament: Falkirk
- Scottish Parliament: Falkirk West
- Website: falkirk.gov.uk

Dunipace (Scottish Gaelic: Dùn a' Phais "The hill-fort of the pass") is a village in the west of the Falkirk council area of Scotland. The village is 6.3 miles (10.1 km) south of Stirling and 5.3 miles (8.5 km) north-west of Falkirk. The village is situated on the north bank of the River Carron and adjoins the town of Denny, to the south of the river. Dunipace is part of the historic county of Stirlingshire.

The main road through Dunipace is the A872 road between Denny and Stirling. Based on the 2001 census, Falkirk council reported the population of Dunipace as being 2,444 residents.

== History ==
In 1983 a temporary Roman marching camp was found from aerial photographs just outside the town, north of the Carron. A stone bridge was built between Dunipace and Denny in the 1820s. In 1876 Dunipace was joined with Denny to form the Denny and Dunipace Burgh. This was abolished in 1975 when both areas became part of Falkirk District.

A legend exists that the famous Scottish patriot William Wallace, lived in Dunipace with his uncle, who was a clergyman at the parish church.

Edward the First, King of England, (known as Longshanks), stayed in Dunipace for three weeks in September and October 1301.

== Name ==
Folk etymology explains the name Dunipace as coming from Gaelic Dùn a' Bhàis, 'hill of death' based on a story that the Romans used to crucify Britons on the Hills of Dunipace. However, the name in reality was originally coined in North Brittonic, a language related to Welsh, as either Dyn y Bas, 'fort of the shallow', or Dyn y Pas, 'fort of the pass'.

== Amenities ==
Dunipace is mainly residential, and has a church, a primary school, a few shops (including two hairdressers) and two pubs: The Red Hoose and Bar 209 also an Indian Takeaway (Chilli Hut)

The Red Hoose was used as a filming location for hit Scottish comedy Still Game in the New Year's episode of 2007.

== Sports ==
The local football team is Dunipace F.C. The club was formed in 1888 and is based at Westfield Park. They currently compete in the Lowland League East.

== Notable residents ==
In the First World War 902 men signed up from Denny and Dunipace. Of those 154 were killed in action or died on service. Decorations were earned by 31 men.

- Agnes Eleanora ("Nora") Miller FRSE (1898–1994) zoologist
- Cameron Buchan rower

== See also ==
- List of places in Falkirk council area
