= Onóra =

Onóra is an Irish language feminine given name. It has traditionally been variably anglicised as Honor, Honora, Honoria, Nora, Norah, and Hannah. Its aphesised form Nóra is now more common.

== People ==
- Onóra a' Burc, died 1383
- Onóra Ní Gallchubhair, died 1546
- Onóra Ní Buitiler, died 1577
- Onóra Ní Briain, died 1579
- Onóra Ní Briain, died 1583
- Onóra Ní Bhriain Ara, died 1594
- Onóra Ní Ní Briain, died 1600
- Onora Sylvia O'Neill, Baroness O'Neill of Bengarve, philosopher and member of the House of Lords, born 1941

== See also ==
- List of Irish-language given names
