= American Artist (artist) =

American artist

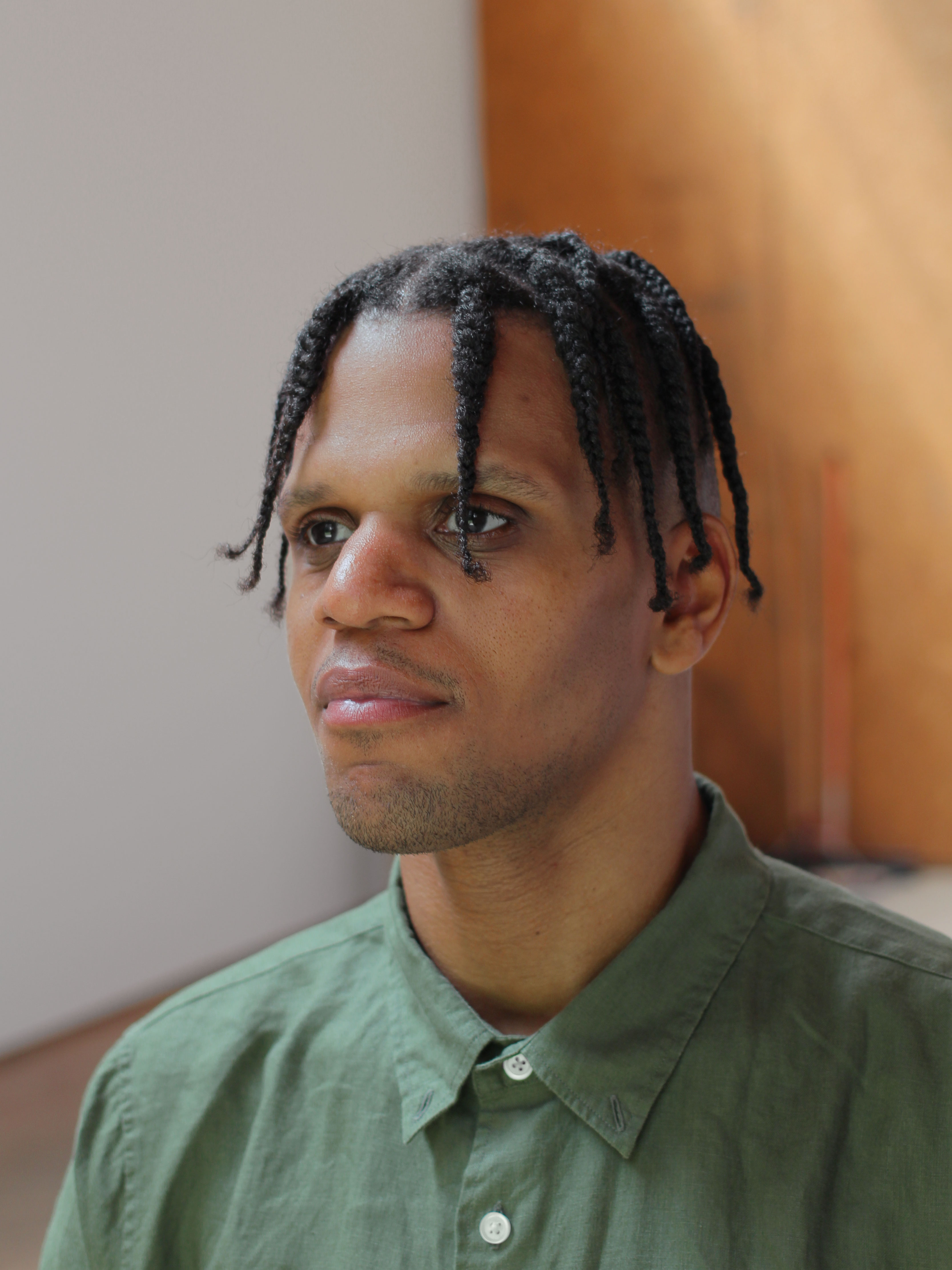
- Born: 1989 (age 36–37); Altadena, California
- Education: Whitney Independent Study program
- Known for: Contemporary Art
- Awards: Guggenheim Fellowship (2026)
- Website: https://americanartist.us

American Artist (born 1989) is a contemporary artist working in new media, video, installation and writing. They legally changed their name to American Artist in 2013, in order to re-contextualize the definition of the term "American artist"—at once taking on the name of an anonymous term while becoming the embodiment of its meaning. Their work, in Artist's words, focuses on themes surrounding "blackness, being, and resistance in the context of networked virtual life." On April 14, 2026, American Artist was named a Guggenheim Fellow.

== Career ==
In a 2022 return to Los Angeles, Artist presented newly commissioned work “Shaper of God” in a solo show at the Roy & Edna Disney CalArts Theatre (REDCAT) to great acclaim.

In 2020, Artist had a solo exhibition at the Queens Museum entitled “My Blue Window,” which included a multi-media installation and app download that enabled viewers to download information on surveillance and predictive policing.

Artist's 2019 solo exhibition "I’m Blue (If I Was █████ I Would Die)" at Koenig & Clinton, New York, transformed the gallery space into a seminar room for six police cadets as a way to simultaneously explore the Blue Lives Matter movement and how this is at odds with black and brown lives.

Their work has a history of addressing police brutality and activism, such as their 2016 piece "Sandy Speaks," in which Artist created a chatbot that imagined Sandra Bland had a means to speak from behind bars, thereby fulfilling her wish posthumously to educate black youth on ways to interact with law enforcement.

Artist's work has been exhibited at the Queens Museum, New York; the Studio Museum in Harlem, New York; the Museum of Contemporary Art, Chicago; Koenig & Clinton, New York; HOUSING, New York; and The 8th Floor, New York. They have participated in group exhibitions including Marking Time: Art in the Age of Mass Incarceration, MoMA PS1, Queens, NY (2020); Parallels and Peripheries, Museum of Contemporary Art Detroit, MI (2019); ICONICITY, Paul W. Zuccaire Gallery, Stony Brook University, NY (2019); A Wild Ass Beyond: ApocalypseRN, Performance Space New York, NY (2018) (a project in collaboration with artists Sondra Perry, Caitlin Cherry and Nora Khan); Geographies of Imagination, SAVVY Contemporary, Berlin, Germany (2018); I Was Raised on the Internet, Museum of Contemporary Art Chicago, IL (2018); Screenscapes, Postmasters, New York, NY (2018); Lack of Location is My Location, Koenig & Clinton, Brooklyn, NY (2017); and Off Pink, The Kitchen, New York, NY (2015).

Artist was named one of the "30 Young Artists to Watch in 2019" by Cultured Mag

== Education ==
Artist received a B.F.A. in Graphic Design from California State Polytechnic University, Pomona in 2011. Then an M.F.A. in Fine Arts from Parsons School of Design in 2015. In 2017, they participated in the Independent Study Program at the Whitney Museum of American Art.
