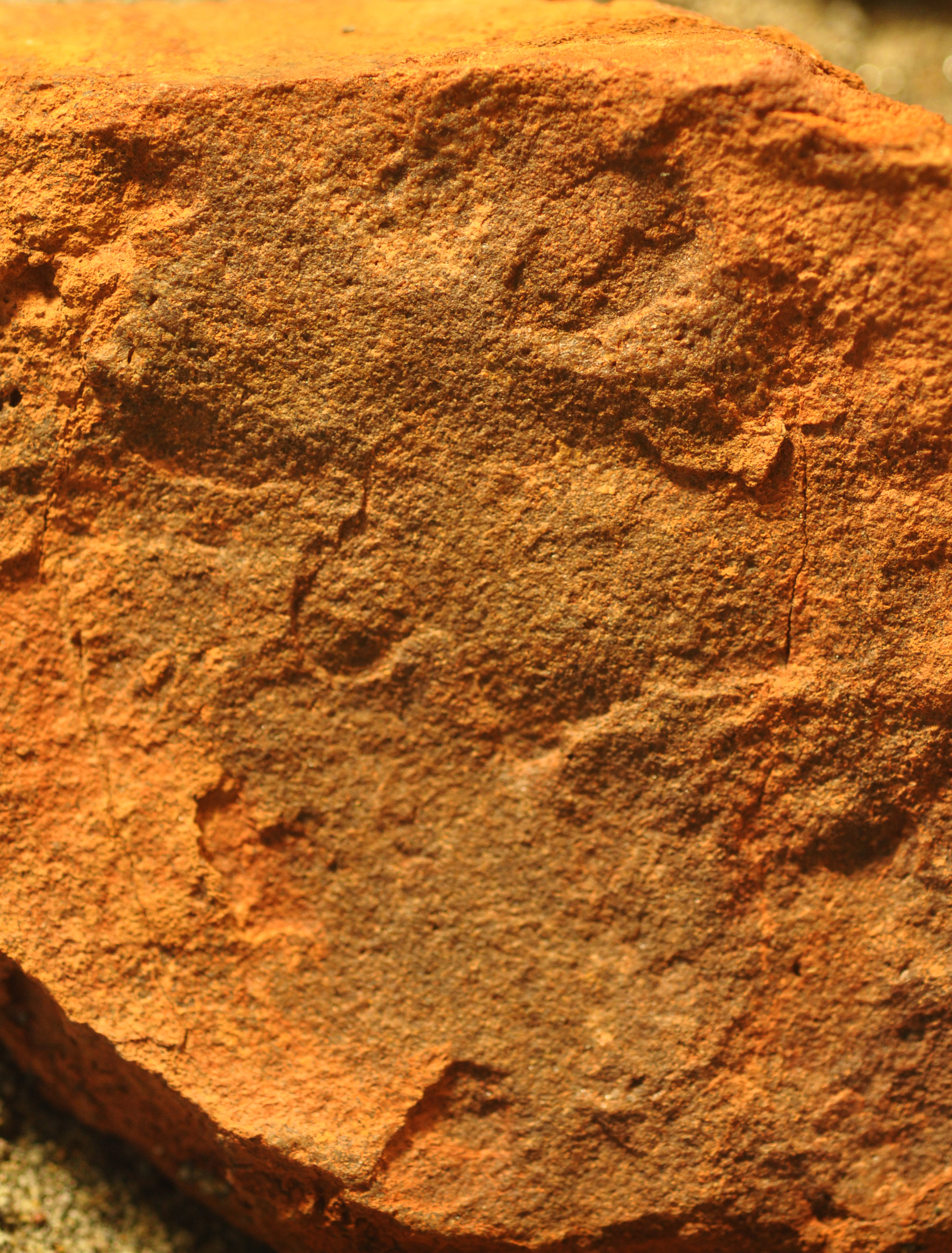
- Holotype of Noffkarkys storaaslii, from Ediacaran Grant Bluff Formation, Central Mount Stuart, Australia

Scientific classification
- Kingdom: incertae sedis
- Genus: †Noffkarkys; Retallack and Broz (2020)

Type species
- †Noffkarkys storaaslii Retallack and Broz (2020)

= Noffkarkys =

Noffkarkys Temporal range: Late Ediacaran, 567–550 Ma

Extinct genus of plants

Noffkarkys ("net of Noffke") is a genus of problematic fossil first found in the Ediacaran (550 million years old) Grant Bluff Formation of Central Mount Stuart, Northern Territory, Australia, and another prostrate frond-like fossil. The genus was named in honor of Nora Noffke.

Thin section across thallus of Noffkarkys storaasli

== Description ==
Noffkarkys is an Ediacaran fossil frond with a fine pattern of rhombic quilts radiating from the base which does not include a rounded holdfast. Like other Ediacaran frond such as Trepassia which also lacks a holdfast, Noffkarkys may have lived prone on the substrate. The fine quilting extends deep into the matrix from the upper side as seen in petrographic thin sections.

== Biological affinities ==
Noffkarkys is a problematic fossil like many Ediacaran genera, and is one of the few vendobionts that persisted into the Cambrian Affinities may be with sea pens or lichens.
