= Cameron Buchan =

Scottish rower

Personal information
- Nationality: British
- Born: 3 December 1992 (age 33) Dunipace, Scotland, United Kingdom
- Height: 204 cm (6 ft 8 in)

Sport
- Country: Scotland UK
- Sport: Rowing
- Event: Eight
- Club: Edinburgh University BC
Medal record
World Rowing Cup Regattas
Bronze medal – third place	2017 Poznań	Eight
Silver medal – second place	2017 Belgrade	Eight

Cameron Buchan (born 3 December 1992) is a British rower. He competes around the world and documents his journey on his Youtube channel. He competed for British Rowing at the 2017 Poznań, Belgrade and Lucerne World Cups as well as the World Championships in the same year.

== Rowing career ==
Originally played basketball for the Great Britain U20 squad, after attending Kent School, CT, to increase his exposure to US university coaches. It was at Kent that he discovered rowing and found his talents growing quickly under the high quality coaching at the prestigious school. Before the rowing season was finished he received a scholarship offer from Northeastern University. At Northeastern he was an integral part of the top eights contributing to some of the best results NU had seen in years. Post university Buchan travelled back to the UK to train, where he won British Rowing April trials, the Ladies Plate at Henley Royal Regatta and FISU world championships in the eight. He was invited onto the British Rowing team after this successful year.

In 2017, Buchan represented Great Britain at Poznań and Belgrade in the World Rowing Cups. On both occasions he competed in the Eight, and placed 3rd and 2nd respectively. He also competed at the 2017 World Rowing championships at Sarasota-Bradenton, where he competed in the Eight, and came first in the B final. On Buchan's second year on the team he pushed harder than before to help improve the results of the previous year. Although having successful internal results Buchan was cut from the team after contracting glandular fever.

On September 14, 2024, Buchan became world champion in the mixed quadruple sculls event at the 2024 Beach sprint World Championships as part of the British national team.

== Personal life ==
Buchan was born in Dunipace, Scotland on 3 December 1992. He attended Denny High School and Kent School. While attending Northeastern University, he majored in business.

Buchan is the founder of the Yamsquad, originally started to embrace the community behind social media. After a while the Yamsquad has evolved into a thriving business and has taken many turns, from creating custom rowing clothing to coaching multiple athletes to world records and world championships. He has a rowing-themed YouTube channel, and is known for his sayings "Food is Fuel", "Aww Yeah", and "Variation is one of the keys to motivation".
