= Noora (given name) =

Noora is a female given name in Finnish and Arabic, which is derived from Nora.

Notable people with the name include:

== Finnish ==
- Noora Hautakangas (born 1984), Finnish model
- Piia-Noora Kauppi (born 1975), Finnish director
- Noora Laukkanen (born 1993), Finnish swimmer
- Noora Louhimo (born 1988), Finnish singer
- Noora Räty (born 1989), Finnish ice hockey goaltender
- Noora Ruskola (born 1994), Finnish sailor
- Noora Tamminen (born 1990), Finnish golfer
- Noora Tulus (born 1995), Finnish ice hockey player

== Arabic ==
- Noora bint Hathal Al Dosari, Qatari princess
- Noora Salem Jasim (born 1996), Bahraini athlete
- Noora Naraghi (born 1988), Iranian motocross racer
- Noora Niasari (Persian نورا نیاسری; born 1989), Iranian-Australian filmmaker

== Nickname and others ==
- Noora Noor (born 1979), Somalian-Norwegian singer

== See also ==
- Noor (name), a common Arabic unisex name
- Noura
- All pages beginning with "Noora"
- All pages with a title containing Noora
