= Microbially induced sedimentary structure =

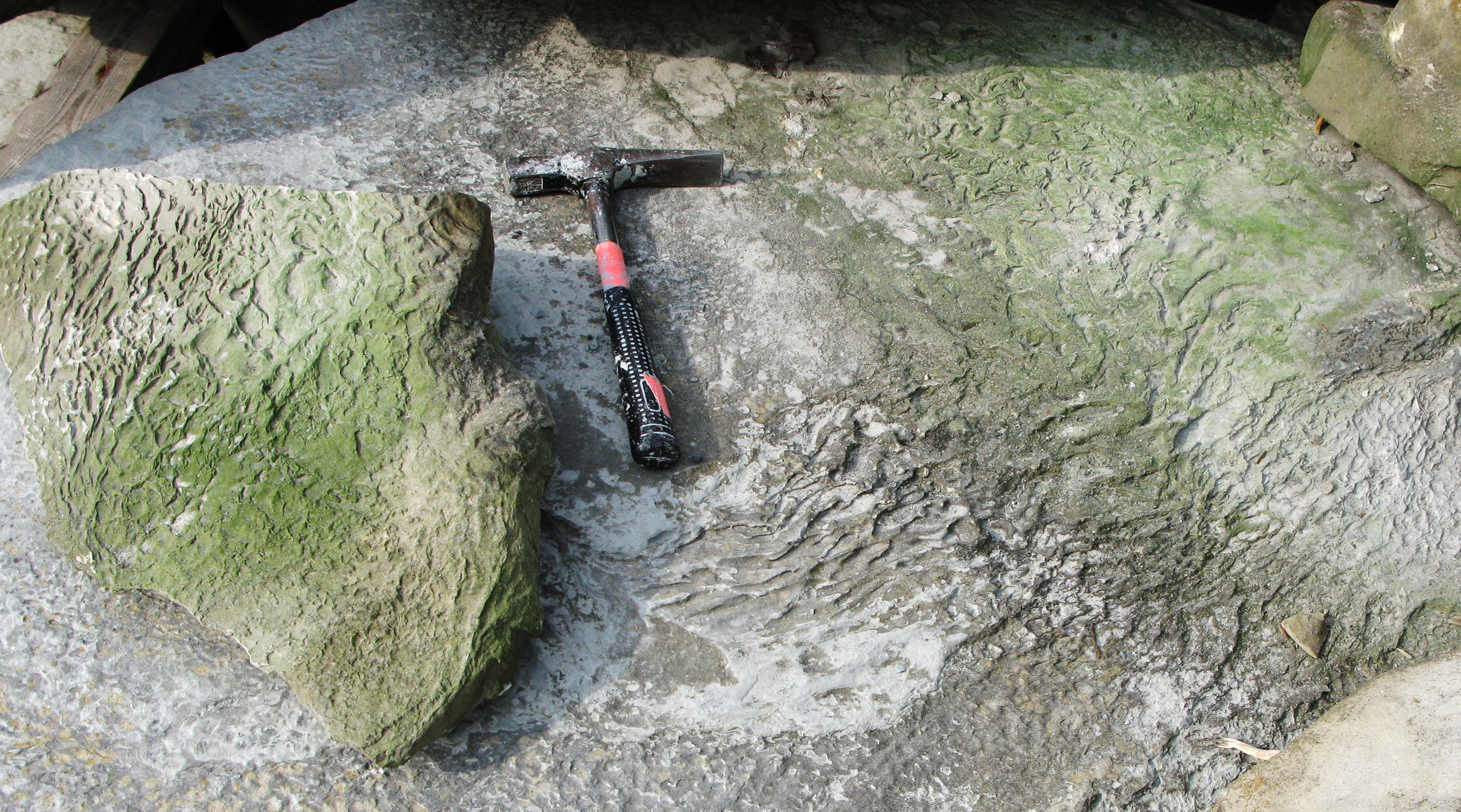
This wrinkled "elephant skin" texture is a feature formed from a non-stromatolite microbial mat. The image shows the location, in the Burgsvik beds of Sweden, where the texture was first identified as evidence of a microbial mat.

Microbially induced sedimentary structures (MISS) are primary sedimentary structures formed by the interaction of microbes with sediment and physical agents of erosion, deposition, and transportation. The structures commonly form when microbial mats (which may comprise bacteria, fungi, protozoans, archaea or algae) are preserved in the sedimentary geological record. There are 17 main types of macroscopic and microscopic MISS. Of those, wrinkle structures and microbial mat chips are the most abundant in the fossil record. Other MISS include sinoidal structures, polygonal oscillation cracks, multidirected ripple marks, erosional remnants and pockets, or gas domes.

Although these structures have only recently been named and systematically described, links between microbes and distinctive structures in sediments and sedimentary rocks have been suggested by several early workers. MISS have been identified in beds formed 3,480 million years ago in the Archean and may be the oldest complete fossils on Earth. In the Ediacaran period, they are often associated with the preservation of fossils of the Ediacara biota; subsequent to this point their prevalence declines as a result of the Agronomic revolution.

A number of criteria have been proposed for recognising genuinely biological structures, and discriminating them from similar-looking features that can arise through geological processes. These relate to the extent of metamorphism to which the rocks have been subjected; their stratigraphic position with respect to sea-level; their depositional environment; their relationship to ancient hydraulics; and their texture.

Individual studies on microbial mat-induced sedimentary structures are summarized and illustrated in several recent books, including Atlas of microbial mat features preserved in the siliciclastic rock record and Microbial Mats in Siliciclastic Depositional Systems Through Time.

According to a study on the planet Mars, there may be sandstone beds, associated with the Gillespie Lake Member of Yellowknife Bay, visited by the Curiosity rover, that are similar to MISS on Earth.

== See also ==
- Cotham Marble
