= Oscar Edward Meinzer =

American hydrogeologist (1876–1948)

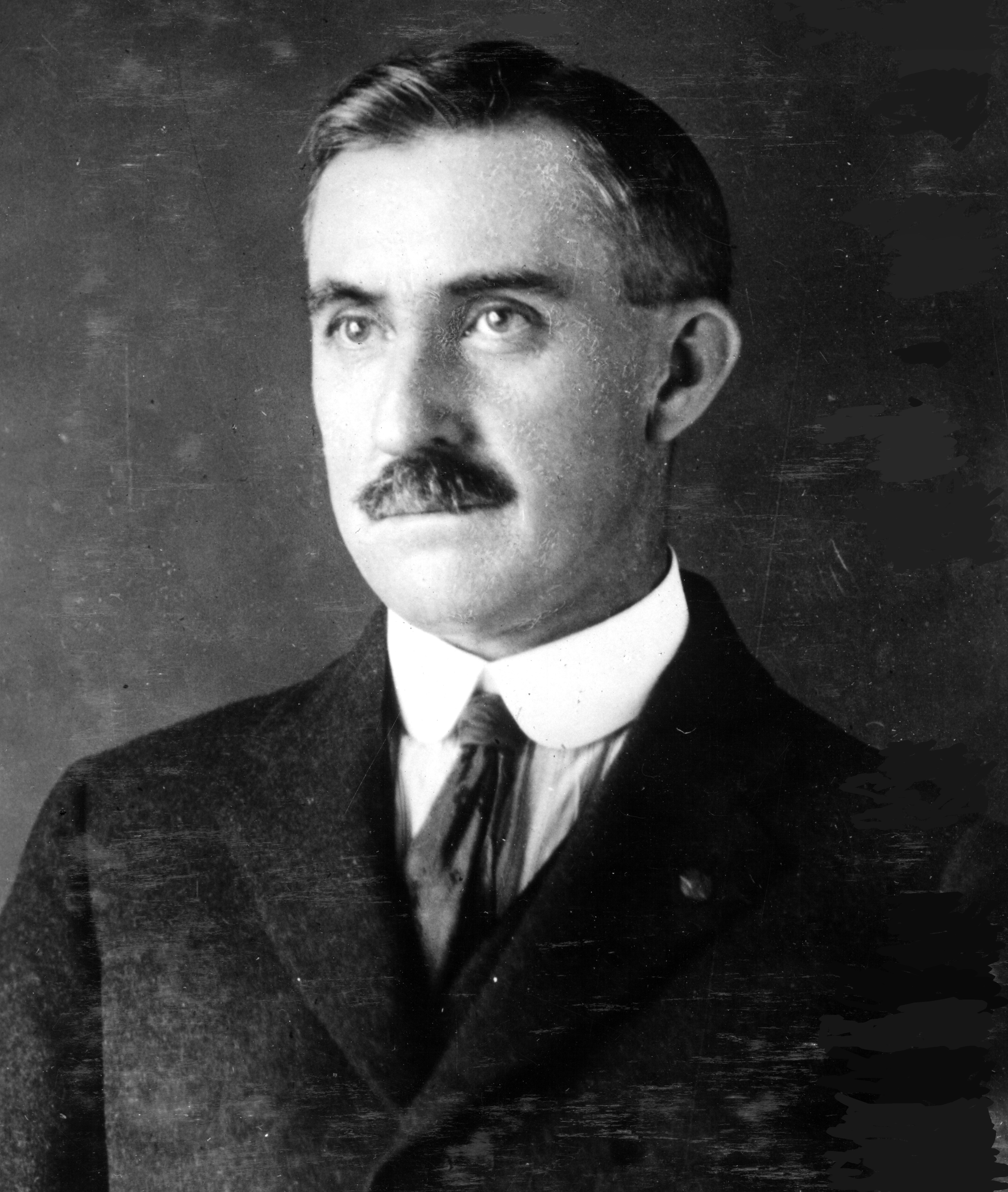
- Meinzer in 1916
- Born: November 28, 1876; Davis, Illinois
- Died: June 14, 1948 (aged 71); Washington, D.C.
- Education: University of Chicago
- Known for: Father of groundwater hydrology
- Spouse: Alice Breckenridge Crawford
- Children: Robert William Meinzer and Roy Crawford Meinzer
- Awards: William Bowie Medal
- Scientific career
- Workplaces: United States Geological Survey
- Thesis: The occurrence of ground water in the United States, with a discussion of principles (1922)

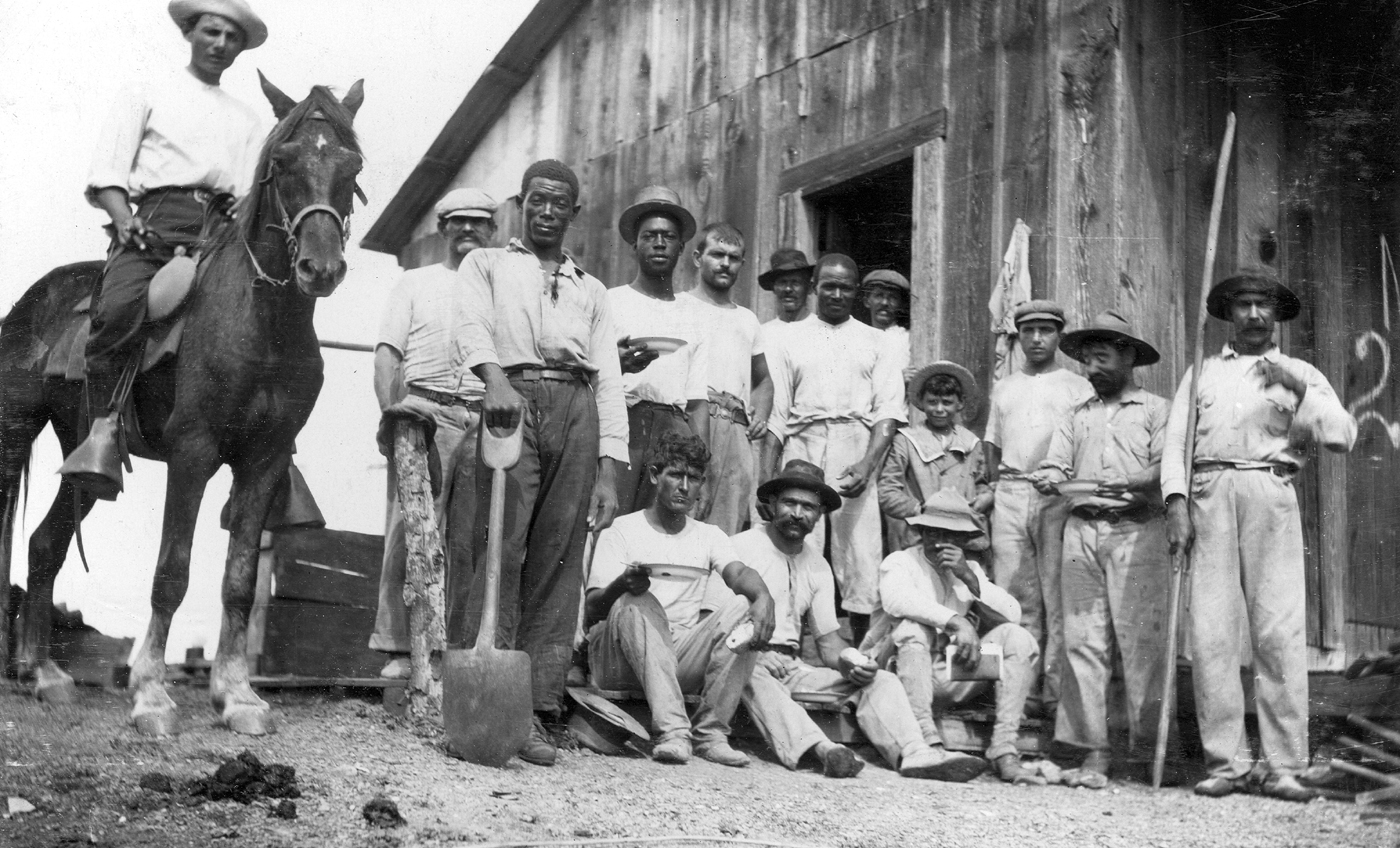
Cuban well diggers at Guantanamo Base in 1920

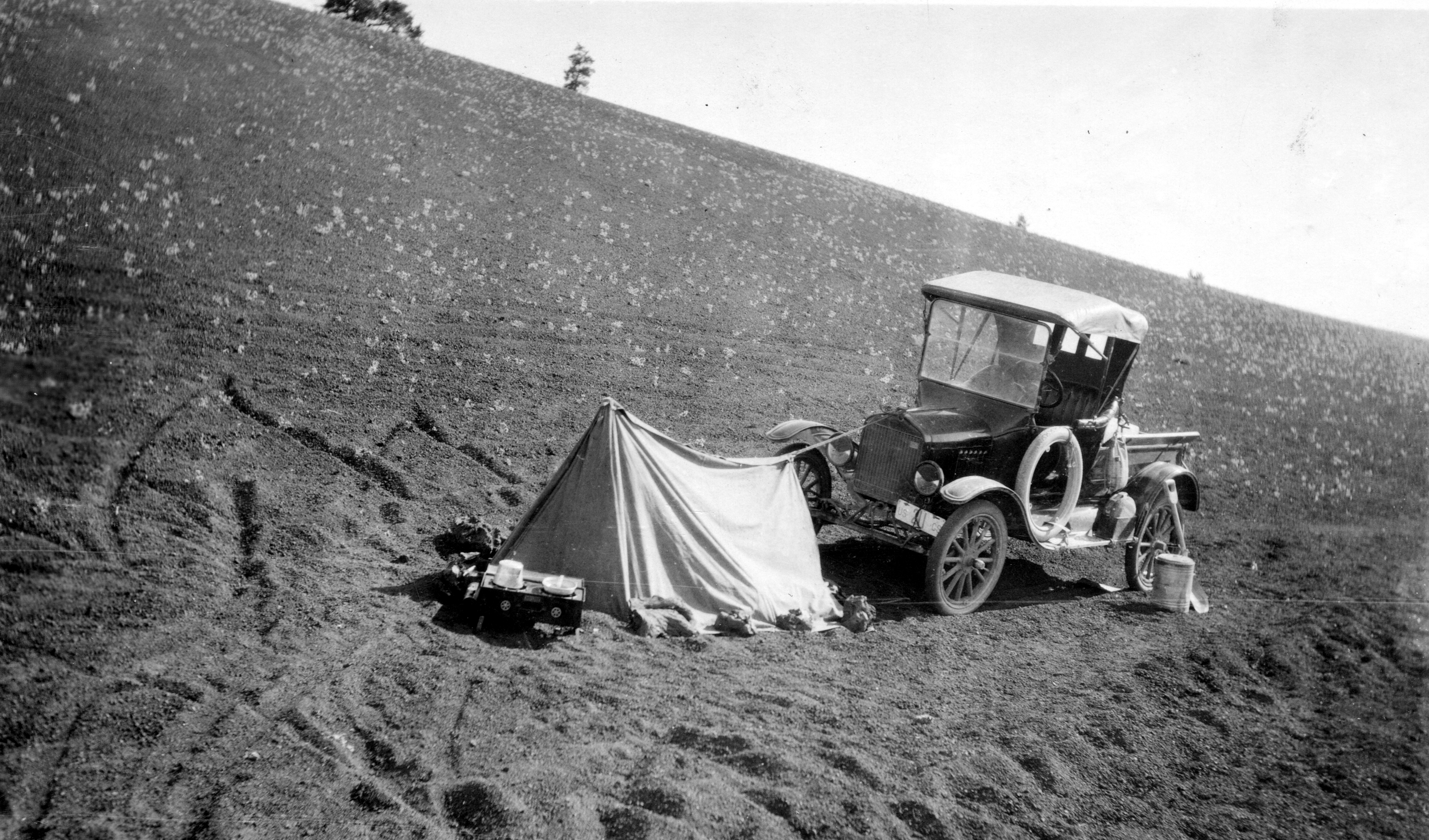
Camp in Craters of the Moon National Monument, 1921 photo by Meinzer.

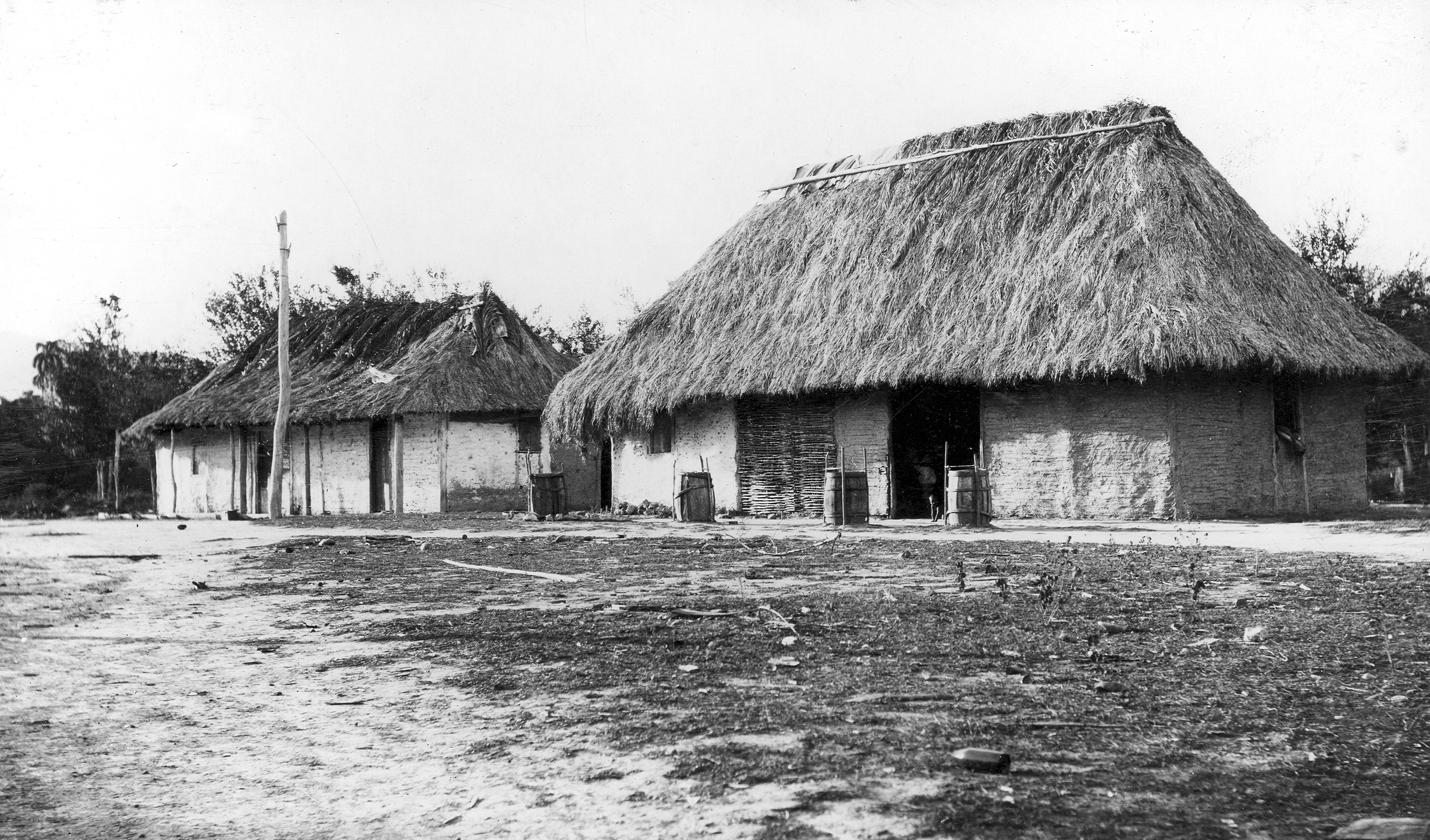
Casa Techo in San Antonio, Cuba (1920)

Oscar Edward Meinzer (November 28, 1876 – June 14, 1948) was an American hydrogeologist who has been called the "father of modern groundwater hydrology". He was awarded the William Bowie Medal in 1943. The O. E. Meinzer award is named after him. He collaborated with Norah Dowell Stearns, one of the first women hydrogeologists.

== Selected works ==
- — (1923). The occurrence of ground water in the United States, with a discussion of principles (PDF) (Report). Water Supply Paper 489. United States Geological Survey.
- — (1923). Outline of ground-water hydrology, with definitions (PDF) (Report). Water Supply Paper 494. United States Geological Survey.
- —; Hard, Herbert A (1925). The artesian water supply of the Dakota sandstone in North Dakota, with special reference to the Edgeley quadrangle (PDF) (Report). Water Supply Paper 520. United States Geological Survey.
- — (1927). Plants as indicators of ground water (PDF) (Report). Water Supply Paper 577. United States Geological Survey.
- — (1928). "Compressibility and elasticity of artesian aquifers". Economic Geology. 23 (3): 263–291. Bibcode:1928EcGeo..23..263M. doi:10.2113/gsecongeo.23.3.263.
- — (1929). A study of ground water in the Pomperaug Basin, Connecticut : with special reference to intake and discharge (PDF) (Report). Water Supply Paper 597-B. United States Geological Survey.
- —; Stearns, Norah Dowell (1929). Problems of the soft-water supply of the Dakota sandstone, with special reference to the conditions at Canton, South Dakota (PDF) (Report). Water Supply Paper 597-C. United States Geological Survey.
- — (1932). Outline of methods for estimating ground-water supplies (PDF) (Report). Water Supply Paper 638. United States Geological Survey.
- —; Fishel, V. C (1934). "Tests of permeability with low hydraulic gradients". Transactions, American Geophysical Union. 15 (2): 405. Bibcode:1934TrAGU..15..405M. doi:10.1029/TR015i002p00405.
- —, ed. (1942). Hydrology. McGraw-Hill.
