= Nora Kelly =

Nora Kelly may refer to:

- Nora Kelly (writer) (born 1945), American-born Canadian mystery writer
- Nora Kelly (journalist), New Zealand-born Australian journalist, poet and playwright, who wrote as Nora McAuliffe
- Jane Toppan (1857–1938), born Honora Kelley, American serial killer
