= Nora Dillon =

English Girl Guide leader

Nora Dillon MBE
- Dillon from a 2001 newspaper article
- Born: Nora Grace Dillon; 25 January 1888; Putney, England
- Died: 11 December 1984 (aged 96); Chester, England
- Website: Dillon House, Seaham

Nora Dillon MBE (25 January 1888 - 11 December 1984) was an English Girl Guide member and executive. She has been "hailed as playing one of the outstanding roles in Guiding in the United Kingdom and beyond." She formed an early Guide company in Seaham, County Durham in 1911 and received the Silver Fish Award, Girl Guiding's highest adult honour, in 1936. Dillon House, Durham Girl Guide headquarters, was named after her in 1975.

== Personal life ==
Dillon was born to Malcolm Henry Dillon and Clara Elizabeth Dillon, née Palmer, in 1888. She had one brother, Malcolm. In 1915, during WWI, Dillon served with the Volunteer Ambulance Drivers in Etaples, France. She returned to Sunderland in 1916, becoming commandant of the 13th Durham Voluntary Aid Detachment Hospital at Seaham Harbour, a post she held until at least 1917. In November 1919 she was invited to Buckingham Palace to receive the Royal Red Cross for her service in England and France.

She received an MBE for public service in 1958.

In 1974, while president of Sunderland's National Society for Prevention of Cruelty to Children, she unsuccessfully petitioned the government to "bring back the birch" and for the age of responsibility to be lowered to eight years. This was in part the result of regular vandalism of her home and garden by young children, about which she said, "these hooligans make me sick and I'm convinced that bringing back the birch is the only answer."

Dillon died in a nursing home.

== Girl Guides ==
Dillon established Seaham's first Girl Guide company in 1911. Her subsequent roles within Girl Guiding included:

- District commissioner of Sunderland
- Durham County commissioner from 1927 until 1948
- Durham County president

In the 1930s she joined three cruises "designed to link youngsters from across the world" where she visited countries where Guiding and Scouting was in operation, including Holland, Poland, Latvia, Finland, Sweden, Iceland and Malta. In 1932 she was presented with the County standard "in affectionate recognition of her work." In 1936 Dillon received the Silver Fish Award for service to the Girl Guide movement, awarded by the co-founder of the movement, Lord Baden Powell.

In 1975 "Dillon House", Durham Girl Guides' headquarters, was opened and named in her honour. In her will Dillon left £2,000 to Durham Girl Guides Association and £500 to support Dillon House.

== Other ==
Other roles Dillon held included:

- Sunderland Royal Infirmary, board of management, member
- Sunderland Royal Infirmary League of Friends, chair
- YWCA, president
- Women's Branch of Sunderland Conservative Association, president
- St John Ambulance Brigade, county officer
- Junior Imperial League, president
- National Society for the Prevention of Cruelty to Children, Sunderland branch, chair

She was awarded the Order of St John of Jerusalem.
