= Nora Nash =

Activist

Nora Nash is a Sister of St. Francis of Philadelphia and shareholder activist. She is a member of the Philadelphia Coalition for Responsible Investment as well as the Interfaith Center on Corporate Responsibility (ICCR). Nash is also a speaker at Neumann University and other universities on justice and advocacy.

== Early life ==
Nash grew up in Limerick County, Ireland. In her early life, Nash dreamed of becoming a missionary in Africa, but in 1959, she arrived in Pennsylvania to join the Sisters of St. Francis, an order founded in 1855 by Mother Francis Bachmann, a Bavarian immigrant focused on social justice. Nash took her Franciscan vows of chastity, poverty, and obedience two years later, in 1961.

== Shareholder advocacy ==
Nash is the director of corporate responsibility for the Sisters of St. Francis of Philadelphia.

=== Wells Fargo ===
On April 24, 2017, Mercury news reported that Nash was a co-filer of a resolution that demanded that Wells Fargo's board order a comprehensive report about the root causes of the bank's fraudulent activity in a September 2016 scandal involving unauthorized cross-selling and the creation of fake accounts, and the steps taken to improve risk management and control processes.

=== Exxon Mobil ===
Nash was part of a group of investors, who in 2017, put forth a historic climate-change resolution at ExxonMobil which was passed with 62 percent of shareholders voting "yes". ExxonMobil board had recommended voting against the resolution.

== Awards and recognition ==
Nash has been recognized by the Interfaith Center on Corporate Responsibility as well as in a November 12, 2011 profile in the New York Times which referred to Nash as "one of the most surprising" corporate activists for her shareholder advocacy work.
