= Nora Perry =

Nora Perry may refer to:

- Nora Perry (writer) (1831–1896), American poet and writer
- Nora Perry (badminton) (born 1954), English former badminton player
