= Nora Smith =

Nora Smith may refer to:

- Nora Archibald Smith (1859–1934), American children's author
- Nora Lawrence Smith (1885–1971), American newspaper publisher and activist
