= Nora Torulf =

Swedish author and politician (1903–1993)

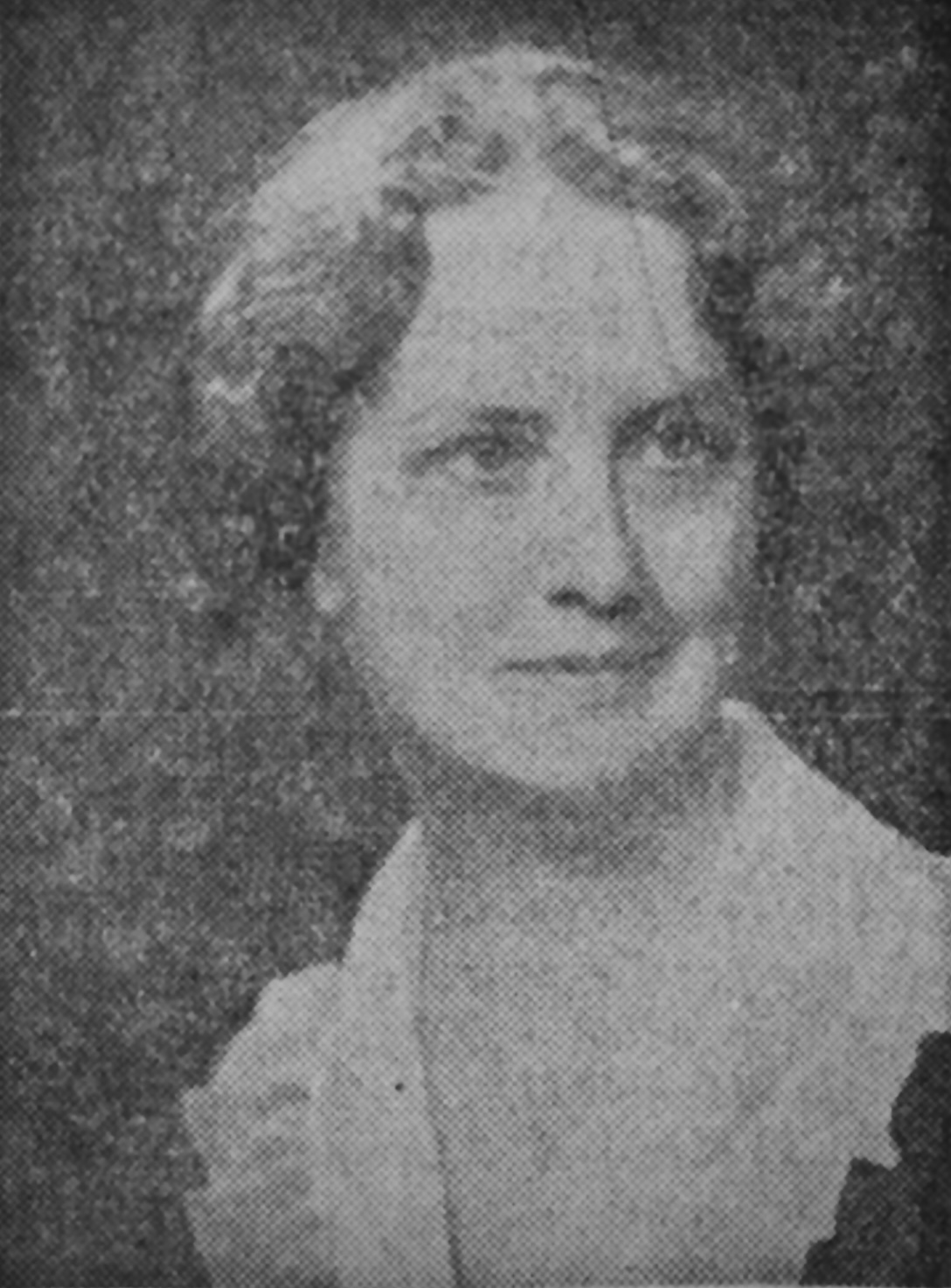
- 1939
- Born: 1903
- Died: 1993 (aged 89–90)
- Occupations: Writer; Journalist

Nora Torulf (1903–1993) was a Swedish nationalist politician and author. She was one of the leading figures of the Sweden's right wing movement. She served as the chair of an association targeting nationalist women between 1939 and 1942.

== Biography ==
Torulf was born in 1903. In 1937 she visited Nazi Germany and published her notes on the role of women in the Nazi administration in a newspaper. Based on her observations she designed a pilot labor camp targeting Swedish women in 1938 which was regarded as a success by the right wing figures and by nearly all political parties except for the communists. Liberal politician Bertil Ohlin was among the supporters of her initiative. In March 1939 the National Association of Female Civil Service (Swedish: Riksförbundet Kvinnlig Samhällstjänst) was established in Stockholm based on Torulf's experimental activity, and she was appointed chair of its executive committee. She held the post until 1942. During her term the association did not manage to get the financial aid from the state due to her obvious Nazi leaning. Torulf was among the founders of the organization entitled Aid Committee for the Children of Germany (Swedish: Hjälpkommittén för Tysklands Barn) which was established in 1945.

Torulf published many political books. She was married, and as of 1945 she was residing in Norrköping. She died in 1993.
