= Norah Dowell Stearns =

American hydrogeologist

- Born: Norah Dowell; 1891
- Died: Unknown
- Spouse: Harold T. Stearns
- Scientific career
- Fields: Hydrogeology
- Institutions: United States Geological Survey

Norah Dowell Stearns (1891–unknown) was an American hydrogeologist from Providence, Rhode Island. She was one of the earliest-known women to contribute to hydrogeology.

== Biography ==
In the early 20th century, she published without co-authors,. Her work continued to be cited in the later 20th century.

She frequently collaborated with her husband, Harold Thornton Stearns, who was also a geologist. Although there are few records about her education, she is referred to as Dr. Norah D. Stearns, suggesting that she received a PhD.

She was an American hydrogeologist and one of the first women to contribute to the field of hydrogeology. Norah Stearns was born on June 14, 1891, in the city of Providence of Rhode Island. She got her undergraduate degree in 1913 from Browns University. Later in 1916, she would obtain a pHD in geography from the same university. Starting in 1924, Norah Stearns would work for the United States Geological Survey (specifically the Groundwater Division which was directed by Oscar Edward Meinzer).

Norah Stearns married Harold Thornton Stearns, a geoscientist, in 1925. It is speculated that they met while working at the Groundwater Division Project Together they would have two children. The oldest being Stanley Stearns (1926-2013) and a younger daughter, Dorothy E. Stearns (1927-?). Together, they would travel through the United States for work.

After Norah and Harold divorced in 1938, she moved to Seattle with her children. Vincent believes that she then started working for the Office of Strategic Services, a precursor to the CIA, and worked there until 1962. Although little is known about her later life, it is evident that she was an overlooked but accomplished geologist.

In the early 20th century, she published without co-authors. Her work continued to be cited in the later 20th century.

She frequently collaborated with her husband, Harold Thornton Stearns who was also a geologist

Her sister Dorothy was one of the Hopevale Martyrs.

Norah Stearn worked on papers with Harold. T Stearns but the credit was only given to her husband, it is suggested that she could have contributed to other pieces of work but did not receive credit for them.

== Education ==
- 1913, Undergraduate degree from Browns University
- 1916, pHD in geography from Browns University

== Career and accomplishments ==
- One of the earliest known women to contribute to the study of hydrogeology
- Part of the Groundwater division
- Worked closely with the notable Oscar Edward Mainzer who is considered the "father of modern groundwater hydrology"
- Worked on three papers with Mainzer. He supervised part of her work for her first paper in 1927
- Between 1927 and 1938, Norah Stearns authored and co authored at least 13 scientific publications
- Focused on geology, hydrogeology, and the formation of the Hawaiian Islands and Guam.
- Co-authored Thermal Springs in the United States with Harold T. Stearns and Gerald A. Waring
- Made an appearance with her husband in the Mauna Loa Volcano Hawaii- 1930's eruption.
- Mentioned but not always cited as a co author in two other pieces of work: "Geology of reservoir and dam sites- geology of the Owyhee irrigation project" and "The Theim method for determining permeability of water bearing materials and its application to the determination of specific yield: results of investigations in the Platte River Valley. Nebraska.
- From 1938 to 1962, she worked for the Office of Strategic Services

== Bibliography ==
- Meinzer, Oscar E. and Stearns, Norah D. A study of groundwater in the Pomperaug Basin, Connecticut. US Geological Survey Water Supply Paper, 1927/1929, vol. 2309. 597-B, p. 73-146.
- Stearns, Norah Dowell. Laboratory tests on physical properties of water-bearing materials. 1927. US Geological Survey Water Supply Paper, 596
- Stearns, Norah D. (1935). "Annotated Bibliography and Index of Geology and Water Supply of the Island of Oahu, Hawaii (Bulletin 3)".
- Stearns, Norah D.(1935). An island is born; Oahu roars up from the deep to claim its place in the Hawaiian group of Polynesia; a story of geological genesis. Honolulu, Hawaii: Honolulu Star-Bulletin Co.
- Stearns, Norah D.; Stearns, Harold Thornton; Waring, Gerald Ashley (1937). Thermal Springs in the United States. U.S. Government Printing Office.
