= Nora Wilhelm =

Swiss activist and social entrepreneur

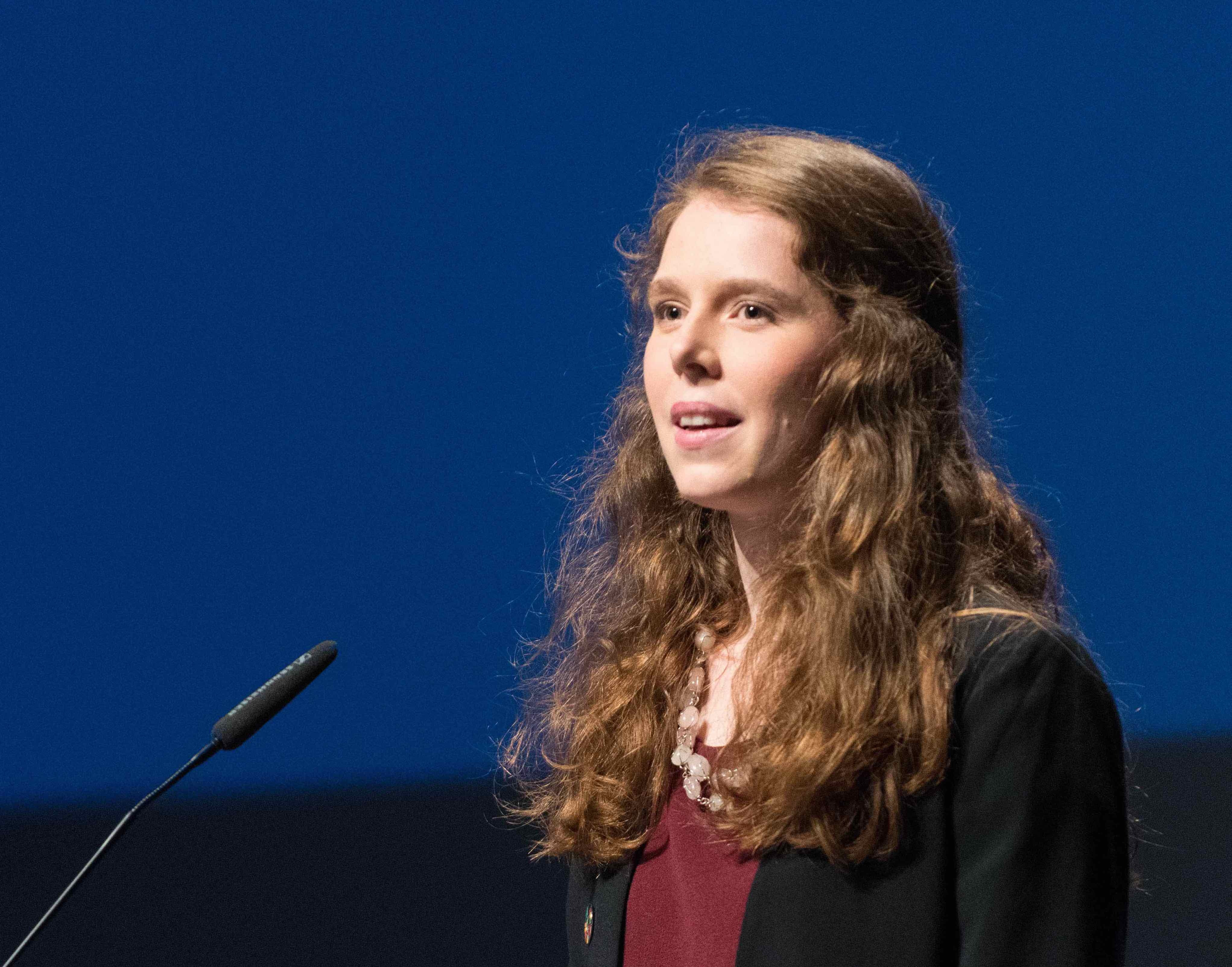
Nora Wilhelm (2019)

Nora Wilhelm (born May 25, 1993, in Aarau) is a Swiss activist and social entrepreneur for the goals of the 2030 Agenda. She is a co-founder of the "collaboratio helvetica" initiative and has been honoured as Young Leader by UNESCO.

== Biography ==
Nora Wilhelm completed her education in Meyrin. In her youth, in addition to her work as an activist, volunteer and intern for development NGOs, she took part in UN Youth conferences and was involved in the European Youth Parliament (EYP)... She presided over the EYP Switzerland from 2014 to 2016 and took over the project management of an International Session (Laax 2016) under the patronage of Federal Councillor Didier Burkhalter. She criticises the politics of fighting the symptoms and the lack of focus on the root causes of the societal challenges of our times and advocates for stronger systematic thinking.

She studied International relations at the University of St. Gallen and is currently pursuing a master's degree in Social innovation at the University of Cambridge. She lives in Bern (as of 2020).

== Impact ==
As Co-founder and Catalyst of "collaboratio helvetica", she has been connecting and supporting actors who are working towards the 17 goals of the United Nations (UN) 2030 Agenda for Sustainable Development (SDGs) in Switzerland since 2017. Through various forms of collaboration and social innovation, they aim to foster systems change towards more environmental sustainability, humanity and common good in Switzerland. Nora Wilhelm acts as a catalyst, facilitator and speaker at universities, in the public and private sector.

- Nora Wilhelm was the keynote speaker opening the first SDG Lecture Series at ETH Zurich
- She was a keynote speaker at the annual 2019 Swiss Cooperation Development Conference hosted by the Swiss Agency for Development and Cooperation (SDC)
- At TEDx Lucerne she spoke about "The Hidden Variable of Societal Transformation"

== Honours ==
The jury of Forbes 30 Under 30 selected Nora Wilhelm as one of 30 extraordinary Swiss People under 30 in 2020.

Nora Wilhelm is one of 35 finalists for the "Young Champions of the Earth" Award 2020 by the United Nations Environment Programme (UNEP).

In 2019, the Junior Chamber International Switzerland (JCIS) recognised Nora Wilhelm for her efforts in the Environment and Ethics category.

In 2018, Nora Wilhelm was recognised by the International Youth Foundation as one of 20 Young Global Leaders.

In 2018, the magazine annabelle recognised Nora Wilhelm as one of Switzerland's 80 Female Doers
