= Norma Wagner =

American civil rights activist

- Born: Norma Jean English; April 22, 1928; Morris, Pennsylvania, U.S.
- Died: September 20, 1998 (aged 70); New York, U.S.
- Other names: Norma Meminger
- Occupation: Civil rights activist

Norma Jean English Wagner Meminger (April 22, 1928 – September 20, 1998) was an American civil rights activist. She was one of the white Freedom Riders arrested in the American South in 1961.

== Early life and education ==
English was born in Morris, Pennsylvania and raised in Avon, New York and Exeter, New York, the daughter of Kenneth F. and Alma Frances Northrup English. In 1947, she graduated from the New York State School for the Blind in Batavia.

== Career ==
Wagner hoped to become a teacher, but blind people were barred from teaching in New York public schools at the time. Hoping to change the law, she was legislative chair of the Empire State Association of the Blind in 1958, and lobbied in Albany.

Wagner became a Freedom Rider in 1961, trained in non-violent resistance by the Congress of Racial Equality (CORE). She traveled to bus terminals in the American South, to desegregate waiting rooms and lunch counters. In Jackson, Mississippi, other members of her group were arrested, but police declined to arrest her, as they were "wary of bad publicity". At the same protest, they declined to arrest an Indonesian man, because they were unsure of his racial status under Jim Crow laws.

On a second trip to Jackson, Wagner and Earl Bohannon Jr., a young Black man from Chicago, sat together smoking and drinking milkshakes at the bus depot for several hours, then continued on to New Orleans, where they also succeeded in having coffee together with another Black activist, Alice Thompson, at the city's main bus depot. However she was "finally arrested" in New Orleans the next day, for distributing leaflets without a permit. She was released on bail, and given parole.

Wagner's activism for racial justice continued at home in Rochester, New York. She co-chaired the Action Council and the housing committee of CORE, and protested United States involvement in the Vietnam War, school segregation, and housing discrimination. "Are we granting Negroes the privilege of living on our neighborhood? No, it is their right to live here. It has always been their right to live here," she wrote in 1962. In 1964 she attended the American Council of the Blind meeting in Niagara Falls.

== Publications ==
Wagner was a staff correspondent for The Rochester Voice, a local civil rights newspaper.

- "Rochester North or South" (1962)
- "Commentary: Ode to a Neighborhood" (1962)

== Personal life ==
Norma English married Milton Wagner in 1949. They were both members of Temple B'rith Kodesh. He died in 1980; she remarried in 1983, to widowed Vietnam War veteran Bill Meminger. They were both members of the Church of Jesus Christ of Latter-day Saints. She died in 1998, at the age of 70, survived by her second husband and four sons.
