= Nora Young (cyclist) =

Canadian cyclist

Nora Young (athlete)
Personal information
- Born: September 8, 1917 Middlesbrough, Yorkshire, England
- Died: 26 March 2016 (aged 98) Bowmanville, Ontario, Canada

Cycling career
- Sport: Cycling
- Discipline: Early era athlete who rose to prominence as one of the top female road cyclists in Canada

Amateur team
- 1930s & 1940s (aged 17 to 35): Individual

Professional team
- 1985 to 1999 (aged 68 to 82): World Master’s Games; U.S National Senior Olympics,

Major wins
- First place in the (unofficial) Women's race held during the 1936 Olympic Cycling (men only) tryouts event in Toronto, Ontario, Canada (source: Toronto Daily Star, June 29, 1936)
Medal record
Representing Canada
Senior Women’s Cycling
Bronze medal – third place	{{{2}}}

Nora Young (1917-2016) was a competitive Canadian cyclist who was inducted posthumously into the Canadian Cycling Hall of Fame on September 30, 2018.

Young was one of the top Canadian female cyclists in the 1930s and 1940s.

She also competed in a number of other sports such as softball, hockey, basketball, and others. She continued to win medals into her 70s and 80s.

== Early career ==
Nora Young was born in Middlesbrough, Yorkshire, England (September 8, 1917), the youngest of ten children, and her family immigrated to Fort William (now Thunder Bay) when she was two years old. She grew up playing hockey on Lake Superior and in backyard rinks, with Eaton's catalogues under her wool socks for shin pads, always the only girl on the ice. As she grew older, she began to play for girls’ hockey teams in the area such as the Port Arthur Maroons. In the late 1920s, when Young was about 10, her family moved to Toronto so her father could find work as the Great Depression began. They settled first in Cabbagetown, and then moved to Parkdale.

In her teens, Young began participating in organized sports in the city, starting with softball at age 11. At the time, women were beginning to participate in organized sports at a mass level in the 1920s and 30s, a phenomenon colloquially referred as the Golden Age of Women's Sports in North America, Young being a paradigm of the era.

== The Golden Age ==
A national champion in three sports (cycling, javelin, basketball), Young competed in top venues all over North America during the Golden Age, in front of the likes of William Randolph Hearst and Mary Pickford. She was a natural athlete and a rare “all-rounder” who excelled in multiple sports. For example:

She was an ace player at Sunnyside Stadium (famous across North America for women's softball) where she was coached by legendary athlete Bobbie Rosenfeld.

She was a basketball player who helped her Toronto team to capture the national championship (Underwood trophy) in 1948.

She was a member of the Toronto Ladies hockey team when it was invited to demonstrate the sport at Madison Square Gardens in New York, and then participate in a “barnstorming” tour, playing games across the United States.

== Cycling career ==
She competed constantly in the cycling competitions of her day, starting in the early 1930s, and usually winning or placing near the top of the weekly women's races on dirt tracks the Canadian National Exhibition (where the top female cyclists of the time competed). Often Young was racing on her women's coaster bike – because that's what she had – except in cases where she borrowed a professional bike from one of her male colleagues. It was at the CNE that she set a national record in the ¼ mile time trial in the 1930s, winning the Corcoran trophy.

She also distinguished herself at major long-distance road races in Toronto (sometimes as the only female competitor) and at a historically significant women's demonstration held as part of a Six-Day Race at Maple Leaf Gardens. This event will be featured in "Undeniably Young: Nora Young and the Six-Day Race", an animated film in progress.

== The 1950s and beyond ==
Outside of her sporting career, Young also had a career in the workforce. She was employed in a variety of jobs during her peak years as an athlete, from domestic servant (in her teens) to lab technician . She served in Europe in WWII in the Canadian Women's Army Corps as a jeep driver and canteen operator. In 1959, Young bought a house in the Danforth area of Toronto on her own (a rare thing for a woman in those days). She retired from her job early, in her 50s, as she was beginning to experience arthritis that affected her work. She also stopped cycling for a while, but missed it, and began racing training again in the 1970s.

== Later life ==
In the 1980s, she began competing in masters athletic tournaments. As a masters athlete, she participated in cycling and other sports in Canada, the United States, and Australia, where she set records and won medals in various age categories.

In 2005, Young moved from Toronto to Newcastle, Ontario, where she lived independently during her final years; she finally gave up bike riding at the age of 92. She died in Bowmanville on March 26, 2016, at 98.
