= Nora Sumberg =

Australian artist

- Born: 1956 (age 69–70); Bairnsdale, Victoria, Australia
- Education: Caulfield Institute of Technology, New York Studio School, Monash University
- Known for: Artist, painter
- Notable work: Oil on canvas/linen/panel

Nora Sumberg (born 1956) is an Australian landscape painter whose work has over time become increasingly lyrical, abstract, and atmospheric. Her art is characterized by intense, floating swathes of colour, impressionistic and ambiguous terrain, and glowing, multi-directional light sources. Examples of Sumberg's art are held in The National Gallery of Victoria, The Queensland Art Gallery, The Heide Museum of Modern Art and the Smorgon Collection.

Sumberg is the granddaughter of Voldemar Sumberg, the Minister for Social Affairs under the Otto Tief Government in Estonia. Estonian culture is important to Sumberg and she has an artist residency in Tallinn in 2011.

== Early life ==
Sumberg was born in Bairnsdale, Victoria, Australia. She completed a diploma in fine arts (painting) at Caulfield Institute of Technology in Chisholm (now Monash University) in 1976.

This was followed by postgraduate studies at the New York Studio School in New York in 1978. She received a diploma in education at Melbourne State College in 1979. She attained a Master Arts in fine arts at Monash University in 1996.

== Career ==
=== Formative years ===
Sumberg's early paintings were figurative and somewhat indebted to pop art and the milieu she was part of, with areas of bold, flat colour and schematic, heavily out-lined drawing, done in enamel on Masonite. Australian artist and critic Robert Rooney wrote of these works, "The best are boldly painted and ambitiously constructed, often with the aid of fish-eye lens distortion...Surfaces are smooth, with an occasional drip on a tuxedo in Dijon Waiter or a wrinkled skin in Model Lisa No. 6. Flat areas and images are outlined in black."

=== Maturity ===
What's the matter, 2004 oil on canvas.

Sumberg's shift into landscape included the introduction of architectural elements and props, frequently depicting expressive, labyrinthine mazes or Italian villa garden features such as topiaries, gazebos, statues, and columns. Sumberg's construction of space is unconventional and complex, with multiple or hidden horizons and the cropping and over-lapping of contradictory, slightly tilted perspectives (often the result of separately painted panels joined together), giving a subjective account of wandering through the many windings and turnings of such gardens.

These works followed a residency at the Australia Council's Besozzo Studio, where Sumberg studied 19th-century Italian villa gardens. These paintings were typically large, multi-panel works. Australian poet and art critic, Gary Catalano, wrote, "Too little of the art I see forces my eye to change gear, and I like Sumberg's paintings for just this reason".

Jenny Zimmer reviewed the 1990 exhibition "Purely Painting" at Michael Wardell Gallery, writing that Sumberg: "transforms sun and cloud and the effects of each on the other into bursts of sensation. Though infused with the nature worship of European romanticism, Sumberg's effects are modern".

== Awards and prizes ==
- 1978 Visual Arts Board, Australia Council, Peter Brown Memorial Scholarship, New York Studio School, United States
- 1982 Visual Arts Board, Australia Council, Besozzo Studio, Italy
- 1988 Visual Arts Board, Australia Council, Project Grant
- 1989 St Kilda City Council Acquisition Drawing Prize, Melbourne
- 2000 Artist in Residence, Bundanon, The Arthur & Yvonne Boyd Program for the Arts, Shoalhaven, New South Wales
- 2003 Artist in Residence, The Tower Studio, Victorian Trades Hall Council, Melbourne
- 2004 Artist in Residence, St Vincent's Hospital, Melbourne
- 2005 Artist in Residence, Queensland College of Art, Griffith University, Brisbane
- 2007 Artist in Residence, Red Gate Gallery, Beijing, China

== Collections ==
- Artbank, Sydney
- The Arthur and Yvonne Boyd Centre for the Arts
- Baillieu Myer Collection
- Heide Museum of Modern Art
- Monash University
- Museum of Contemporary Art, Sydney
- National Gallery of Victoria, Melbourne
- Queensland Art Gallery, Brisbane
- Smorgan Collection
