= Nora Greenberg =

Israeli politician and LGBT rights activist

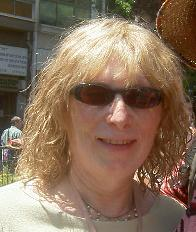
Nora Greenberg

Nora Greenberg (Hebrew: נורה גרינברג) is an Israeli politician and LGBT rights activist. Her advocacy is particularly focused on the rights of transgender people.

From 2001 until 2004, Greenberg was The Agudah National Board's representative for transgender people and went on to become the Chairperson of the Task Force.

Greenberg collaborated on and jointly served a petition to the High Court with attorney Ronit Liran. The petition, written by attorney Hisham Shveita, called for the Interior Ministry to allow people to change their gender on identity cards without the requirement to have undergone gender-affirming surgery. She has also called for the Ministry to allow transgender people to change their name on their identity card.
