= Nora Pierce =

American author and academic

Nora Pierce is an American author and academic based in California. She has taught creative writing at Stanford University and is the author of The Insufficiency of Maps (2007).

== Career ==
Pierce studied creative writing at Stanford University, and was awarded a Wallace Stegner Fellowship in Creative Writing. She was then a lecturer and teacher of creative writing at Stanford. She has been a Rosenthal Fellow in the PEN Center Emerging Voices program.

Pierce had several writer's residencies, including at Cité Internationale des Arts, in Paris, at Headlands Center for the Arts in 2004, and at The Vermont Studio Center. In 2003 she was part of the Community of Writers, annual writing conference.

Her work appeared in Barcelona Review.

== Personal life ==
Pierce is of Native American and Lebanese descent. She is married and has one child.

== The Insufficiency of Maps ==
Pierce's debut novel, The Insufficiency of Maps was published April 1, 2007. It is a coming-of-age tale that grapples with issues of contemporary Native American experience. It describes the progress (and gradual realisations) of Alice, the daughter of a schizophrenic and alcoholic mother, beginning with her early life in a trailer on a reservation, and transitioning into a chaotic existence between cultures, after she runs away from a foster care placement in a white suburban family.

Janet Fitch, author of White Oleander, stated that the novel explores "fundamental human experiences - love, dependence, marginality, madness".

The novel was called a "promising" and "forceful debut". In a mixed review, the Sarasota Herald-Tribune's Susan Rife proffered a more mixed review. Rife criticized the novel's metaphors and noted that the novel was slow to start, though concluded it is "filled with graceful images and a heart-rending story."

The Insufficiency of Maps was a finalist for the Northern California Independent Booksellers Association Book of the Year award in 2008.
