= Honor Titus =

American artist

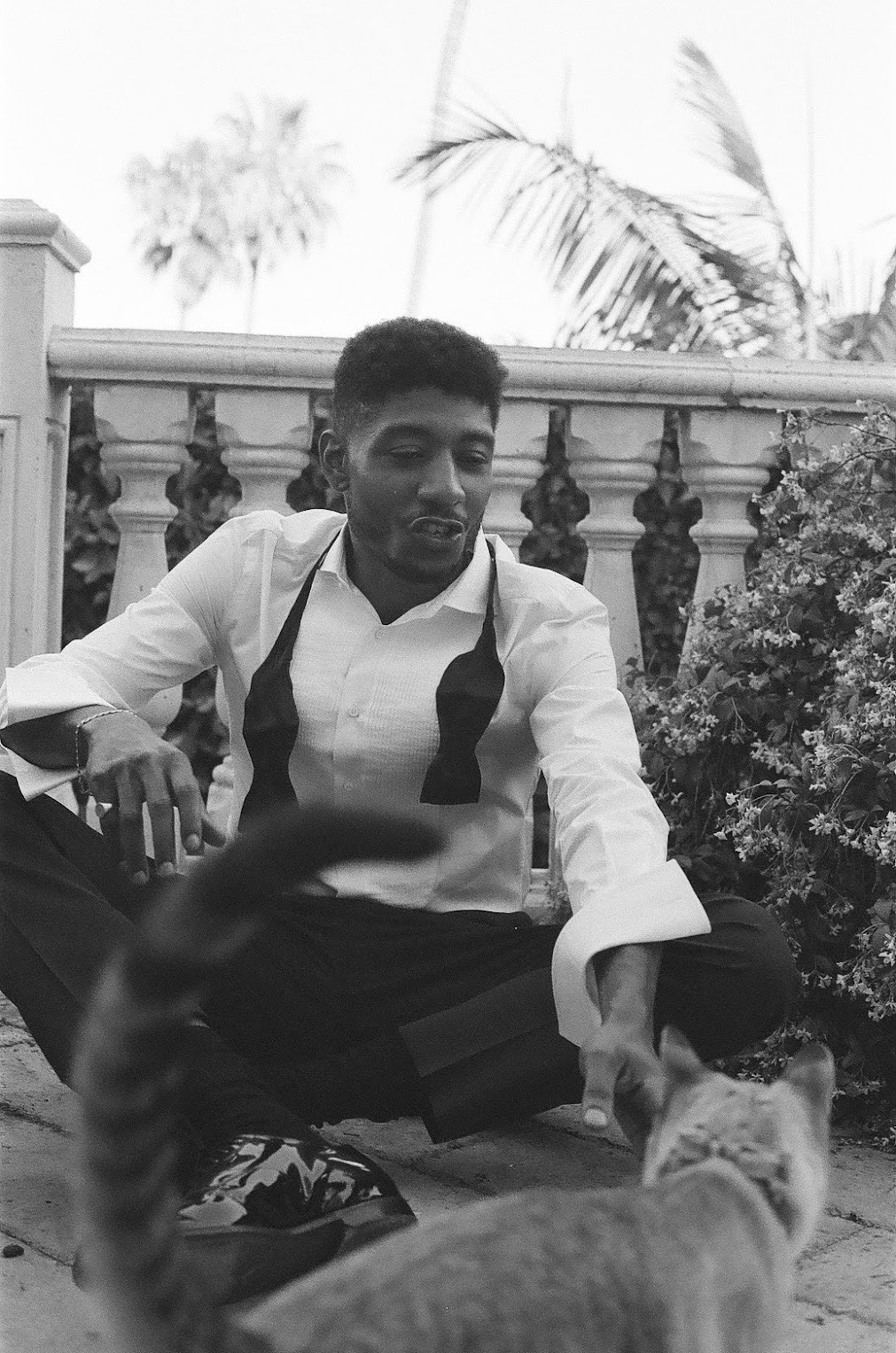
- Titus in Hollywood
- Born: July 18, 1989 (age 37); Brooklyn, New York, United States
- Known for: Painting
- Website: honortitus.com

Honor Titus (born July 18, 1989) is an American artist based in Los Angeles. His figurative paintings explore leisure, social ritual, class, and the relationship between public appearances and private experience. Drawing on European painting, American portraiture, and literature, his work depicts tennis players, dancers, debutantes, and solitary figures in settings shaped by formal dress, decorative architecture, and conventions of social belonging.

Titus has held solo exhibitions at Timothy Taylor in New York and London, Gagosian in Beverly Hills, and the Longlati Foundation in Shanghai. His painting Portable Prince entered the Nasher Museum of Art's collection in 2023. That year, he also participated in the royal commission Windrush: Portraits of a Pioneering Generation. In 2025, the Queens Museum presented a monumental reproduction of his painting Louis Malle Practice on its façade.

== Early life and artistic development ==
Titus was born in Brooklyn, New York, and grew up in Canarsie. Before concentrating on painting, he was the vocalist of the punk band Cerebral Ballzy. His early involvement with visual art included working with Raymond Pettibon and Dan Colen. A self-taught painter, he subsequently developed a friendship and mentorship with Henry Taylor.

He moved to Los Angeles in 2016. In 2020, Taylor presented Titus's solo exhibition Goodness Gracious at his former Chinatown studio. Titus began working with Timothy Taylor in 2021, when the gallery presented For Heaven's Sake, his first New York solo exhibition.

== Work and influences ==
Titus's paintings combine expanses of saturated colour with patterned surfaces and carefully observed gestures, clothing, and posture. Figures appear within compositions that move between recognisable settings and flattened, semi-abstract arrangements. The Queens Museum has identified his attention to movement and attire, alongside his use of rhythmic pattern, as defining characteristics of his work.

His influences include Pierre Bonnard, Édouard Vuillard, and Félix Vallotton, members of Les Nabis whose work challenged distinctions between painting and decoration. In his essay "Honor Titus's Moral Imaginations", curator Klaus Ottmann also identifies Edward Hopper, Alex Katz, and Kehinde Wiley among Titus's acknowledged influences. Ottmann connects the paintings' intimate atmosphere and scenes of leisure to questions of longing, emotional experience, and the moral possibilities of the imagination.

In a 2021 conversation with Henry Taylor for Interview, Titus also identified Andy Warhol as an inspiration, citing Warhol's openness to different ways of thinking and his emphasis on beauty and visual appeal.

Literature provides another framework for Titus's approach to character and social observation. The Nasher Museum identifies F. Scott Fitzgerald, Evelyn Waugh, and J. D. Salinger as significant influences. Discussing Bourgeoisie in Bloom, Titus likened his perspective to that of the observant outsider in fiction, citing Nick Carraway in The Great Gatsby and Charles Ryder in Brideshead Revisited. This interest informs paintings in which figures occupy the margins of festivities or appear absorbed in private thought within elaborately organised social environments.

Class and racial representation recur throughout the work. His paintings place Black figures within settings associated with inherited privilege, including formal dances and sporting environments. Titus has also emphasised his interest in creating an inclusive vision of beauty and pleasure. In a 2024 interview with Frieze, he described class, social structure, leisure, and beauty as continuing concerns, while identifying an increasingly graphic and abstract direction in his compositions.

== Exhibitions and institutional projects ==
In 2022, the FLAG Art Foundation featured Thy Margent Green in its Spotlight series, accompanied by a conversation between Titus and Derek Blasberg. Later that year, Bourgeoisie in Bloom opened at Timothy Taylor in London. The exhibition examined debutante and cotillion culture through scenes of anticipation, ceremony, and solitude. Works including Central Park West, My Baby's Breath, and Shimmering Jubilee situated individual figures within the visual language of parties, formal interiors, and evening dress.

Advantage In, Titus's first exhibition with Gagosian, opened in Beverly Hills in July 2023 and included new paintings and an installation. Tennis supplied the exhibition's central subject. Titus described his interest in the sport through its associations with leisure and class, as well as the psychological demands of playing.

Later in 2023, the Longlati Foundation presented Ornamental Distance in Shanghai, comprising thirteen oil paintings. The exhibition examined the decorative fence as both an architectural motif and a mechanism of exclusion. Ornamental barriers were incorporated into the installation, extending the paintings' questions about access, spectatorship, and distance into the gallery itself.

Titus painted Delisser Bernard for the King's Windrush portrait project. The commission brought together ten artists to honour members of the Windrush generation; the portraits were subsequently displayed at the National Portrait Gallery in London.

In 2025, the Queens Museum, the Armory Show, and Gagosian collaborated to present an enlarged reproduction of Louis Malle Practice on the museum's exterior during the US Open. The project commemorated the seventy-fifth anniversary of Althea Gibson breaking the colour barrier at the US Nationals. The painting depicts a tennis player watching an unseen match, and its title references the French filmmaker Louis Malle.

== Collections ==
Titus's work is held in museum, foundation, and private collections, including:

- Museum of Contemporary Art, Los Angeles
- Dallas Museum of Art
- Pérez Art Museum Miami
- Nasher Museum of Art at Duke University, Durham, North Carolina
- Flint Institute of Arts, Michigan
- Royal Collection, United Kingdom
- FLAG Art Foundation, New York
- Longlati Foundation, Shanghai
- Rennie Collection, Vancouver
- The Bunker Artspace, Beth Rudin DeWoody Collection, West Palm Beach, Florida
- David and Indre Roberts Collection, London

== Publications ==
The first monograph devoted to Titus's painting, Honor Titus, was published in 2023 by Anomie Publishing and Timothy Taylor. It includes a foreword by Henry Taylor and essays by Durga Chew-Bose and Klaus Ottmann, with reproductions of twenty-three paintings. Ottmann's contribution places Titus's work in dialogue with the history of decorative painting and interprets its depictions of social acceptance alongside the exclusions embedded in those traditions.
