= Nora Miller =

Scottish zoologist

Nora Miller FRSE
- Born: Agnes Eleanora Miller; 7 September 1898; Dunipace, Falkirk, Scotland
- Died: 23 March 1994 (aged 95)
- Education: Westbourne School; Skerry's College
- Alma mater: University of Glasgow

Agnes Eleanora Miller FRSE (7 September 1898 – 23 March 1994) was a Scottish zoologist and Fellow of the Royal Society of Edinburgh.

== Life ==
She was born in Dunipace in central Scotland on 7 September 1898, the eldest daughter of William Douglas Miller and his wife Agnes Cameron Adam, a singer and pianist who studied under Sir Hubert Parry. In 1906, the family moved to 57 Kirklee Road in Glasgow.

She was educated at Westbourne School for Girls, Glasgow and then attended Skerry's College for a year. She then attended the University of Glasgow, originally studying medicine but changing to Zoology under the influence of John Graham Kerr, graduating with a Master's degree in 1920. She became Kerr's Demonstrator in 1924, and began lecturing in Zoology in 1929.

In 1954 she was elected a Fellow of the Royal Society of Edinburgh. Her proposers were Sir Maurice Yonge, Sir John Graham Kerr, Harry Slack and Sheina Marshall.

She waited until the end of career before submitting her PhD thesis, and was awarded her doctorate by the University of Glasgow in 1962.

In 1963, she retired and left the family home to live with her widowed sister, Betty Gordon, in Crieff. She died in a nursing home on 23 March 1994 at the age of 95.

== Publications ==
- Studies in Dipnoan Structure
