= Nora Fischer =

Nora Fischer may refer to:

- Nora Barry Fischer, American judge
- Nora Fischer (singer)
- Nora Fischer (Austrian cyclist), Austrian cyclo-cross cyclist
