= Nora Kate Weston =

Australian cabinet-maker and woodcarver

- Born: 18 June 1880; Parramatta, New South Wales, Australia
- Died: 16 August 1965 (aged 85); Berrima, New South Wales, Australia
- Other name: "Chips" Weston
- Education: School of Art Wood-Carving, South Kensington
- Occupation: Cabinet-maker

Nora Kate Weston (June 18, 1880 – August 16, 1965), also known as "Chips" Weston, was an Australian cabinet-maker who taught woodcarving, carpentry and leatherwork. She was influential in the arts and crafts movement in Australia.

== Early life ==
Nora Kate Weston was born on 18 June 1880 at Parramatta in New South Wales. Her parents were Frederick Weston and Mary Ann Elliott. She had eight brothers and sisters.

== Career ==
Weston studied in London at the School of Art Wood-Carving, South Kensington.

Weston opened Sydney studios which offered art classes, lessons in woodcarving, carpentry and leatherwork. Together with her partner Eirene Mort, and artists Dorothea Adams and Beatrice Pearson, she gave private lessons to adults and groups of children at their studio.

The studio became a professional design and Australian art centre which operated for more than 30 years. They promoted Australian products and design, designing and manufacturing furniture, wood carving, metalwork, bookbinding and leatherwork, using their own designs.

Weston was an early member of the Society of Arts and Crafts of New South Wales.

Weston taught crafts to wounded soldiers in various hospitals in World War I and in World War II.

== Personal life ==
Weston died on 16 August 1965 at Berrima.
