= Nora Khan =

American art critic, curator and writer

Norah Nahid Khan
- Born: October 23, 1983 (age 42); Warwick, Rhode Island
- Education: BA, English Literature, Harvard University (2005) MFA, Fiction, Iowa Writers' Workshop, University of Iowa (2008)
- Occupations: Art critic, curator, and writer
- Website: https://noranahidkhan.com/

Nora Nahid Khan is a Warwick, Rhode Island-born American art critic, curator, and writer of fiction, non-fiction, and literary criticism. Khan has served on the Faculty of the University of California, Riverside, and at the Rhode Island School of Design. She was the executive director of the Project X Foundation for Art & Criticism from 2022 to 2023. In 2022 Nora Khan was appointed the first Editor-in-Residence of Topical Cream.

== Early life and education ==
Born 23 October 1983 in Warwick, Rhode Island, Khan went on to study English literature at Harvard University, graduating in 2005. She was awarded the Thomas T. Hoopes, Class of 1919, Prize, which recognizes top senior theses, as well as the Edgar Eager Memorial Fund Prize. Khan continued her higher education with an M.F.A. in Fiction at the Iowa Writers’ Workshop at the University of Iowa under an Iowa Arts Fellow scholarship from 2006 until she graduated 2008.

== Writing ==
Khan has published in Rhizome, Art in America, The California Sunday Magazine, Eyebeam, Longform.org and The Village Voice. She has exhibited or worked on exhibits at Koenig Gallery and avant.org. She has published two books on media culture, including Fear Indexing the X-Files (Primary Information, 2017) and Seeing, Naming, Knowing (Brooklyn Rail, 2017). Forthcoming books on digital art and machine learning include No Context: AI Art, Machine Learning, and the Stakes for Art Criticism (Lund Humphries) and The Artificial and the Real, published (Art Metropole).

== Curating ==
Khan has organized and curated numerous exhibitions on the subjects of media art and digital art. In 2018, Khan co-organized the exhibition "A Wild Ass Beyond: ApocalypseRN" at Performance Space New York. In 2019, she curated the group exhibition "Manual Override" at The Shed, which notably featured the work of Lynn Hershman Leeson. In 2023, she was the co-curator of the Biennale de l’Image en Mouvement.

== Awards and recognition ==
Khan's fiction has been recognized by numerous authorities in the genre. American writer, Katherine Vaz, for example, judged Khan the winner of the Hunger Mountain, Howard Frank Mosher Short Fiction Prize in 2008 for her story The Quarry. The following year, in 2009, she was nominated for the Pushcart Prize and was a finalist in the Best Short Story Award for New Writers Competition. In 2010, her short story Gunn, was judged runner-up in the American Literary Review Fiction Contest.

In 2016, Khan was the winner of a US$20,000 Arts Writing Award in Digital Art for an Emerging Writer, awarded by the Carl & Marilynn Thoma Art Foundation. Later that year, she was announced as one of the new cohorts of research residents at Eyebeam, a center for art and technology in New York City. Khan's research and writing at Eyebeam focused on the history of computerized poetry, bots, and simulations.

== Other work ==
Since September 2015, Khan has been a contributing critic at the Solomon R. Guggenheim Museum as well as a contributing editor at Rhizome., a not-for-profit arts organization that supports and provides a platform for new media art and artists and is based out of The New Museum of Contemporary Art in Manhattan. In October 2016, she teamed up with curator Aria Dean and activist Grace Dunham to develop the Open Score art and technology symposium at the New Museum.

Khan was published in the debut edition of Kill Screen magazine; Kill Screen Issue One: The No Fun Issue in 2010 and again in 2011 in the magazine's 3rd edition, Kill Screen #3: The Intimacy Issue. Khan's work has been published in a number of other printed and online forms, including the following titles by the Harvard Business School: Oprah Winfrey (TN), Bono and U2 (TN), and Gary Hirshberg and Stonyfield Farm. She has contributed to exhibition and artist catalogs, such as the 2016 publication Dawn Mission, edited by Bettina Steinbrügge, about the artwork of Katja Novitskova, published by Mousse Publishing to coincide with an exhibition at the Kunstverein in Hamburg

In November 2016, she joined Christiane Paul (curator) and artist Ian Cheng at the Whitney Museum of American Art in a public discussion about digital art criticism. In February 2017, she spoke at Transmediale in Berlin as part of the media art festival's 30th anniversary. She spoke on a panel called The Alien Middle with German artist, designer, and writer Sascha Pohflepp as well as Dulling Down - The Obsolescence of Intelligence with curator and theorist Inke Arns and Dutch conceptual artist Constant Dullaart. Her speaking appointments in Berlin coincided with the release of the Transmediale exhibition catalog, Alien Matter, to which Khan contributed an essay. Khan was also a guest speaker at the parallel CTM Festival, where she presented her original research Fear Indexing the X-Files with artist Steven Warwick

Khan is currently working on a series of long-form essays that address the questions of how AI and bots will affect human and artistic creativity.
