= Nora Noffke =

American geobiologist

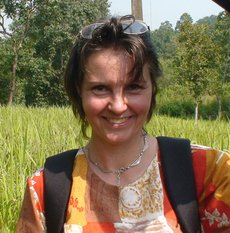
Noffke

Nora Noffke is a German geologist who is a professor in the Department of Ocean and Earth Sciences, Old Dominion University in Norfolk, Virginia, USA. Noffke's research focuses on the sedimentology of biofilm forming sedimentary structures in modern aquatic environments, where clastic deposits dominate. Such structures occur in the fossil record as well. Her studies are interdisciplinary combining sedimentology with microbiology, geochemistry, and mineralogy.

== Early life ==
Noffke's interest in fossils originated from her early years when she would spend time hiking with her parents on the Schwaebische Alb, a mountain chain in Germany. The area was rich in fossils, paving the way for her lifelong career in the field of paleontology and geology.

== Education ==
Noffke received a Bachelor of Science and a Master of Sciences (Diploma) in geology-paleontology from the University of Tübingen, Germany. Her diploma thesis advisor was Dolf Seilacher. Together they carried out research on trace fossils including Daedalus halli from the Lower Arenigian, Montagne Noire, France. Noffke did her Ph.D. in Geomicrobiology at the University of Oldenburg, Germany where she worked alongside Gisela Gerdes, a microbiologist who conducted research in the field of modern microbial mats in siliciclastic deposits. In 2000, Noffke migrated to the US, where she was a postdoctoral researcher at the Department of Organismic Biology and Evolution, at Harvard University, as a guest of Andy Knoll. Shortly thereafter, she became professor for sedimentology at the Department of Ocean and Earth Sciences at Old Dominion University, Norfolk, Virginia.

== Career and research ==
Noffke is known for her work on microbial mats causing microbially induced sedimentary structures (MISS) in sandy deposits. Her work employs the actuopaleontological approach in the examination of the Earth's past. MISS allow insight into past prokaryote and single-celled benthos, and the paleoenvironment and paleoclimate. Noffke discovered 17 different types of MISS that result from microbial growth and EPS-production, trapping, biostabilization, baffling, and binding. The Dresser Formation, Pilbara, Western Australia, includes some of the oldest MISS. The fossil microbial mats covered clastic tidal flats, channels and pools. MISS at Dinosaur Ridge, added knowledge on paleoenvironmental conditions under which the Upper Crustaceous "J" Sandstone formed, and broadened insight of track sites development.

In collaboration with Gerdes, Thomas Klenke, and Wolfgang E. Krumbein, Noffke suggested a new, fifth group to Pettijohn and Potter's classification of primary sedimentary structures. They called the group bedding modified by microbial mats and biofilms, and divided it into two classes: one for those on bedding planes, and the second for those within beds. The first class includes microbial wrinkle structures, mat/sand chips, erosional remnants and pockets, palimpsest/multidirectional ripple marks, shrinkage cracks and mat curls. The second class, within beds, includes biolaminites, gas domes, sponge pore fabrics and fenestrae structures, as well as "microbially induced sedimentary textures (MIST) such as oriented grains, sinoidal laminae, and mat-layer-bound grain sizes.

Noffke's work on microbially induced sedimentary structures (MISS) in sandy deposits is summarized in a textbook. The book describes MISS as biosignatures valuable for the exploration extraterrestrial life.

Noffke is Acting Chair of the Subcommission on Precambrian Stratigraphy of the International Stratigraphic Commission, and is the editor for the volume Prokaryota of the Treatise of Invertebrate Paleontology. Noffke has organized the SEPM Field Conference on Siliciclastic Microbial Mats 2010, and together with John Stolz has established the Gordon Research Conference: Geobiology. She was one of the early chairs of the Division for Geobiology and Geomicrobiology of the Geological Society of America (GSA).

In honor of Noffke's service to the science community, a 550 million year old fossil group from the Ediacaran Grant Bluff Formation, Australia, was named after her: Noffkarkys storaaslii ('net of Noffke')

Noffke was named a fellow of the American Association for the advancement of Science (AAAS). This award is the equivalent of an Oscar for an actor. The AAAS cited her for her work.

"seminal contributions to the field of geobiology, particularly for elucidation of the previously unrecognized 3.5 billion year fossil record of microbially induced sedimentary structures".

Recently, she was elected president of the geological society of Washington, D.C.

== Publications ==
- Noffke, Nora (2010). Geobiology. doi:10.1007/978-3-642-12772-4. ISBN 978-3-642-12771-7.
- Noffke, N., ed. (2005). Geobiology: Objectives, Concepts, Perspectives. doi:10.1016/C2009-0-06348-X. ISBN 978-0-444-52019-7.
- Noffke, N.; Gerdes, G.; Klenke, T.; Krumbein, W. E. (September 2001). "Microbially Induced Sedimentary Structures: A New Category within the Classification of Primary Sedimentary Structures". Journal of Sedimentary Research. 71 (5): 649–656. Bibcode:2001JSedR..71..649N. doi:10.1306/2DC4095D-0E47-11D7-8643000102C1865D.
- Gerdes, Gisela; Klenke, Thomas; Noffke, Nora (April 2000). "Microbial signatures in peritidal siliciclastic sediments: a catalogue". Sedimentology. 47 (2): 279–308. Bibcode:2000Sedim..47..279G. doi:10.1046/j.1365-3091.2000.00284.x.
- Noffke, Nora; Christian, Daniel; Wacey, David; Hazen, Robert M. (December 2013). "Microbially Induced Sedimentary Structures Recording an Ancient Ecosystem in the ca. 3.48 Billion-Year-Old Dresser Formation, Pilbara, Western Australia". Astrobiology. 13 (12): 1103–1124. Bibcode:2013AsBio..13.1103N. doi:10.1089/ast.2013.1030. PMC 3870916. PMID 24205812.

== Awards and honors ==
- 2007: SEPM James Lee Wilson Award for Excellence in Sedimentary Geology by a Young Scientist
- 2007: Fellow of the Geological Society of America
- 2010: Outstanding Contributions to Geobiology, GSA Division for Geobiology
- 2014: Fellow of the American Association for the Advancement of Science (AAAS)
- 2020: College of Science Distinguished Teaching Award, Old Dominion University
