= Honoria (disambiguation) =

Justa Grata Honoria was a granddaughter of the Western Roman Emperor Theodosius I.

Honoria may also refer to:

== Places ==
- Honoria District, Puerto Inca, Peru
- 236 Honoria, main belt asteroid

== People and fictional characters ==
- Honoria Acosta-Sison (1888–1970), Filipina doctor
- Honoria Conway (1815–1892), one of the founders of the Sisters of Charity of the Immaculate Conception Catholic order
- Honoria Somerville Keer (1883–1969), British surgeon during World War I
- Honoria Winchester, sister of Charles Emerson Winchester III on the TV series M*A*S*H
- Honoria Glossop, a fictional character in the Jeeves stories by P. G. Wodehouse
- the title character of Honoria and Mammon, a 1659 stage play

== See also ==
- Honorias, late Roman province of Asia Minor
