= Stimson Formation =

Mudstone ridge slope in Gale Crater, Mars

- Stratigraphic range: Amazonian
- Sandstones of the Stimson Formation on Mount Sharp
- Type: Geological formation
- Unit of: Siccar Point Group
- Underlies: Unnamed formation
- Overlies: (Unconformably) Unnamed formation; (Unconformably) Murray Formation
- Area: 20 km^{2} (7.7 mi^{2})
- Thickness: 0.5–10 m (1.6–32.8 ft)

Lithology
- Primary: Sandstone

Location
- Region: Gale Crater

Type section
- Named by: Grotzinger et al.
- Year defined: 2015

The Stimson Formation is the name given to a distinctive aeolian-bearing sandstone geologic formation studied by the Mars Science Laboratory (MSL) Curiosity at the Gale Crater, Mars.

== Stratigraphy ==
The stratigraphy of Gale Cater, including the Stimson Formation

The Stimson Formation can be found outcropping in Gale Crater, Mars in multiple areas, such as Emerson plateau, Naukluft plateau, and Murray Buttes, were it is unconformably underlain by the mudstone units of the Murray Formation, and is the only known formation of the wider Siccar Point Group so far encountered, and thus the youngest informally named unit found so far by Curiosity. Although, an additional unnamed formation is known overlying the Stimson Formation, whilst there is another unconformably underlying the formation in the Mount Sharp Group.

The formation itself covers an area of roughly 20km^{2}, where it is dominated by massive, cross-bedded, dark-grey sandstones. At Emerson Plateau, the sandstones get up to 7 m (23 ft) in thickness, and bear simple ripple cross-sets, ranging between 0.3–1 m (0.98–3.28 ft) in thickness, which are formed of cross-laminations that are uniform in thickness, measuring in at 4 mm (0.16 in) in width. Meanwhile, at Naukluft Plateau, the sandstones here instead range between 0.5–10 m (1.6–32.8 ft) in thickness, although this time they are trough-cross bedded. There can also be found imbedded concretions with diameters roughly up to 10 mm (0.39 in), and which go from either being sparsely distributed within a singular cross-set to completely covering sediments facies.

== Palaeoenvironment ==
The overall deposition environment of the Stimson Formation was an arid environment, with many ancient aeolian dunes present, primarily inferred from the lack of fine-grained inter-dune and fluvial facies deposits such as laminated mudstone or conglomerate beds. From this, is had been inferred that the dunes of the Stimson Formation were likely deposited after a warm and wet period on Mars, signalling the start of the cold and dry period Mars is in today, being similar to the dark-grey Bagnold Dunes which sit near the formation.
