= Murray Formation =

Mudstone ridge slope in Gale Crater, Mars

- Stratigraphic range: Late Noachian – Early Hesperian; ~3800 - 3600 Ma
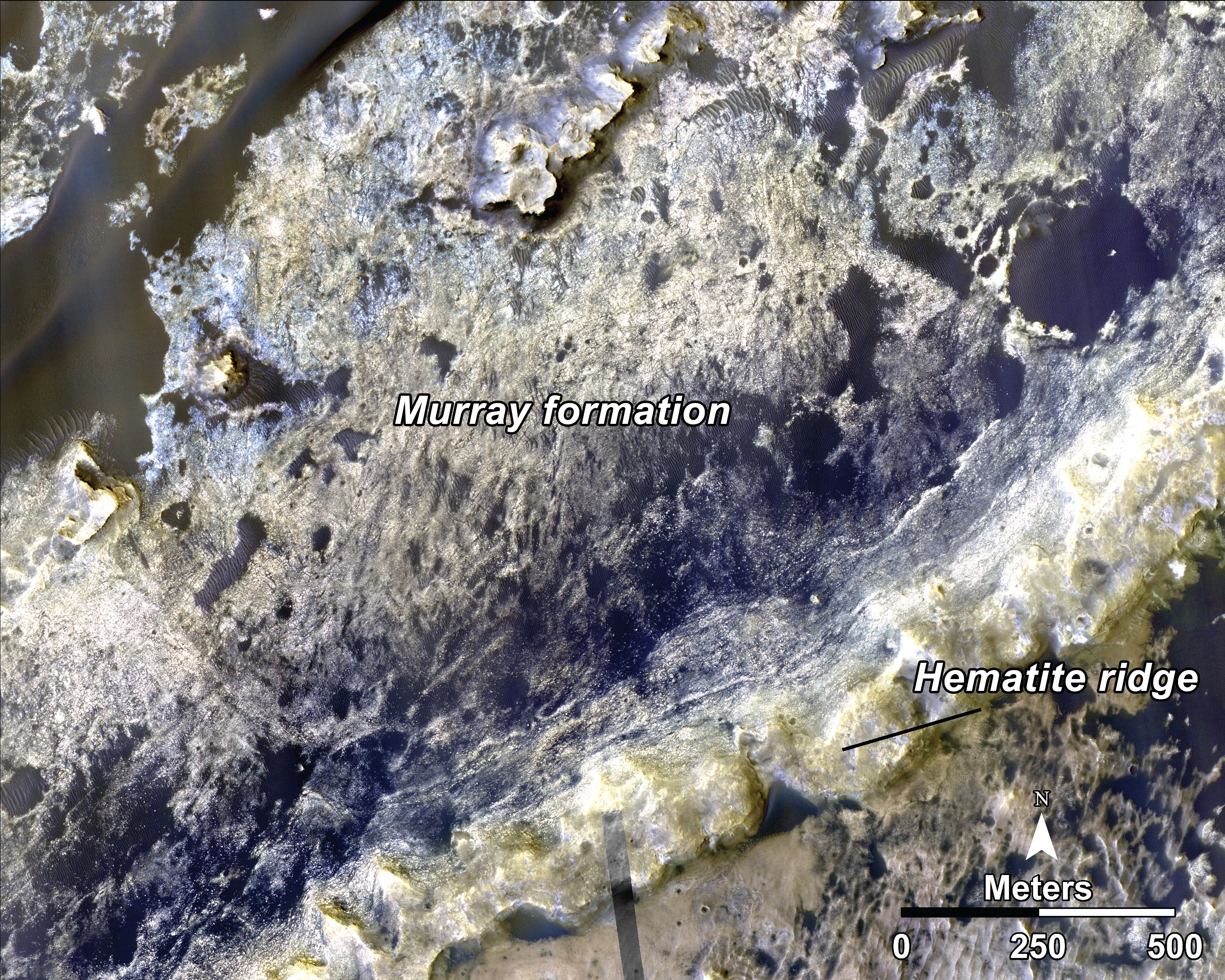
- Geology map - Murray Formation and Aeolis Mons slopes (September 11, 2014)
- Type: Geological formation
- Unit of: Mount Sharp Group
- Sub-units: See: Members
- Underlies: (Unconformably) Stimson Formation
- Overlies: (Inter-fingers) Bradbury Group
- Thickness: 300 m (980 ft)

Lithology
- Primary: heterolithic Mudstone
- Other: Sandstone, Clay

Location
- Region: Gale Crater

Type section
- Named by: Grotzinger et al.
- Year defined: 2015

The Murray Formation is the name given to a distinctive mudstone geologic formation studied by the Mars Science Laboratory (MSL) Curiosity at the Gale Crater, Mars.

== History and naming ==
Before its formal naming, the rocks of the formation, and the wider Gale Crater, were first noted to be of great significance in 2010 by Milliken et al., being referred to as the "Lower Formation", and containing a transition of minerals from clays/sulfates to sulfates/oxides, based on data collected by the Mars Reconnaissance Orbiter using the High Resolution Imaging Science Experiment (HiRISE) and Compact Reconnaissance Imaging Spectrometer for Mars (CRISM). Once Curiosity landed in Gale Crater in 2012, a more precise study could be undertaken as part of the Mars Science Laboratory's (MSL) main mission. Once Curiosity reached the designated area in 2014, John P. Grotzinger et al. were able to confirm that the sediments of Gale Crater were deposited within ancient lakes. The rocks of this formation would be named the "Murray Foramtion" by Grotzinger et al. in 2015.

== Stratigraphy ==
The stratigraphy of Gale Cater, including the Murray Formation

The Murray Formation can found outcropping within Gale Crater, Mars, were it is unconformably overlain by the sandstone units of the Stimson Formation, and is a part of the wider Mount Sharp Group which inter-fingers with units of the Bradbury Group. The formation itself is noted to attain a thickness of rough 300 m (980 ft), and is composed of five members and three distinct facies.

=== Members ===
The Murray Formation is composed of five formal members, which are as follows, in ascending stratigraphic order (lowest to highest):

- Pahrump Hills Member: This member, which attains a thickness of 25 m (82 ft), is where Facies 1 is best preserved, being primarily composed of gray, thinly laminated fine-grained rocks.
- Hartmann's Valley Member: This member, which attains a thickness of 25 m (82 ft), is where Facies 2 is best preserved, being composed of meter-scale trough cross-bedding with steep foresets, with fine-grained rocks.
- Karasburg Member: This member, which attains a thickness of 37 m (121 ft), is where a variant of Facies 1 can be found, being composed of purple, thinly laminated fine-grained rocks, which itseld contains cm-scale concretions.
- Sutton Island Member: This member, which attains a thickness of 98 m (322 ft), is where Facies 3 is best preserved, being predominately composed of heterolithic mudstones and sandstones. The mustones are maroon-colored and finely laminated, whilst the sandstones are composed of cross-laminated with cm-scale ripples and dm-scale cross-stratified sediments.
- Vera Rubin Ridge Member: This member is the thickest, getting up to roughly 100 m (330 ft), although it is not know what facies can be found here. It is primarily composed of fine-grained, thinly laminated rocks, similar to what is seen in Facies 1. In the lower layers, the rocks here are cross-cut by abundant veins of calcium sulfate, with mm-scale nodules are found throughout.

The formation is also composed mostly of basaltic minerals plus clays, though an intermediate horizon contains tridymite, cristobalite, quartz and opal.

== Palaeoenvironment ==
The environment of the Murrary Formation at the time of its deposition was likely that of a lake basin, with abundant fluvial input from the outer crater margins, which permitted the level of the lake to remain stable and exceed evaporation, similar to lake basins on Earth. The lake itself, alongside others on the surface of Mars at the time, were likely stable for 100 to 10,000 years, with lakes coming and going over a period of 10,000 to 10,000,000 years, building up the sediments seen in Gale Crater today.

== Significance ==
The Murray Formation is the target of multiple compelling hints of ancient Martian microbial life. The region contains veins of boron and "halos" of silica likely formed by groundwater flows late in the crater's geologic history and high levels of manganese oxide suggesting Earth-like oxygen levels early in Mars' history.
