= Gale (crater) =

Martian crater

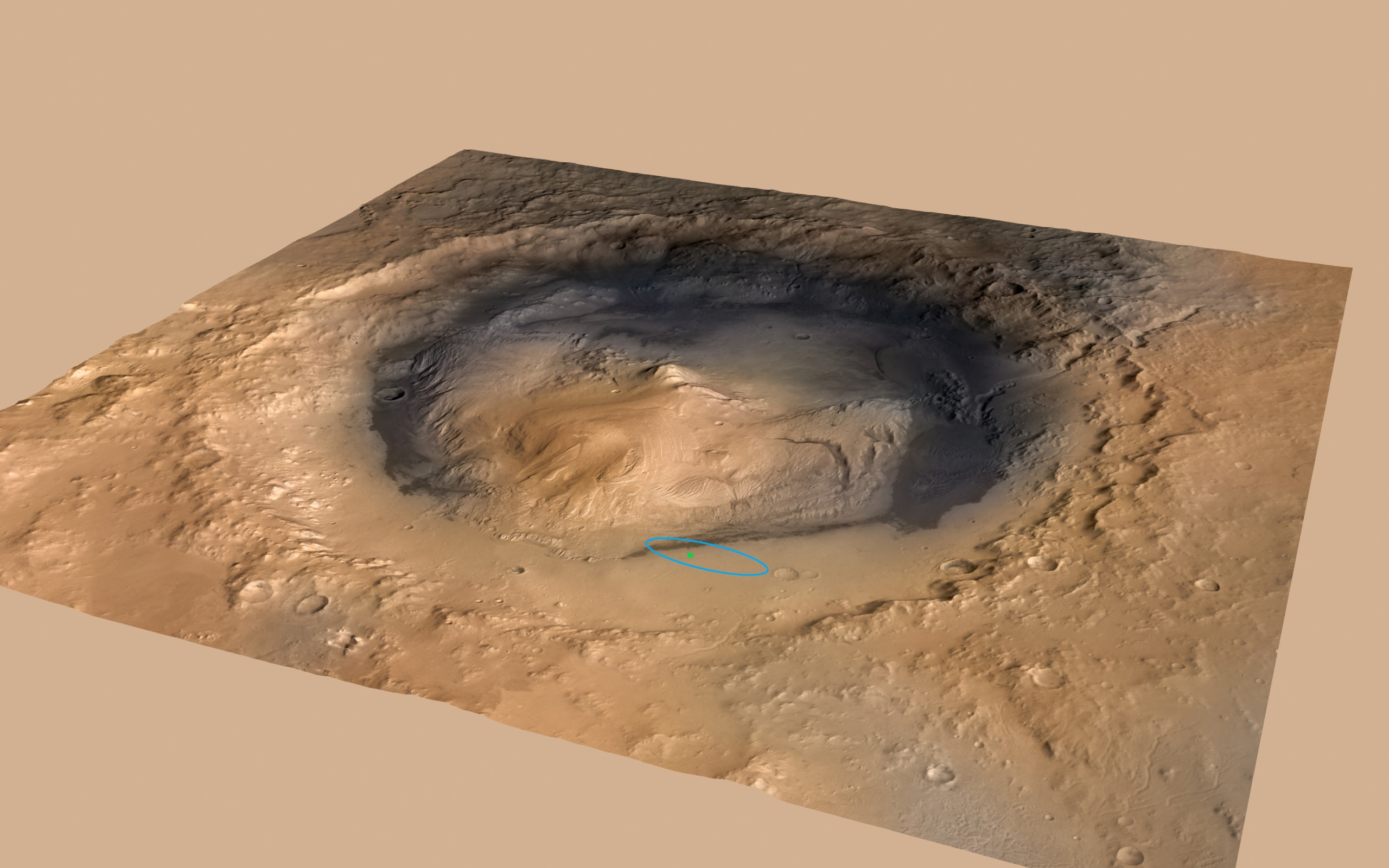
- Mount Sharp rises from the middle of the crater - the green dot marks Bradbury Landing, the Curiosity rover landing site in Aeolis Palus (click the image to expand, the dot is barely visible at this scale.) North is down in this image.
- Planet: Mars
- Coordinates: 5.4°S 137.8°E
- Quadrangle: Aeolis
- Diameter: 154 km (96 mi)
- Eponym: Walter Frederick Gale

Gale is a crater, and probable dry lake, at 5.4°S 137.8°E in the northwestern part of the Aeolis quadrangle on Mars. It is 154 km (96 mi) in diameter and estimated to be about 3.5–3.8 billion years old. The crater was named after Walter Frederick Gale, an amateur astronomer from Sydney, Australia, who observed Mars in the late 19th century. Aeolis Mons, also known as Mount Sharp, is a mountain in the center of Gale and rises 5.5 km (18,000 ft) high. Aeolis Palus is the plain between the northern wall of Gale and the northern foothills of Aeolis Mons. Peace Vallis, a nearby outflow channel, 'flows' down from the hills to the Aeolis Palus below and seems to have been carved by flowing water. Several lines of evidence suggest that a lake existed inside Gale shortly after the formation of the crater.

The NASA Mars rover Curiosity, of the Mars Science Laboratory (MSL) mission, landed in "Yellowknife" Quad 51 of Aeolis Palus in Gale at 05:32 UTC August 6, 2012. NASA named the landing location Bradbury Landing on August 22, 2012. Curiosity is exploring Aeolis Mons and surrounding areas.

== Description ==
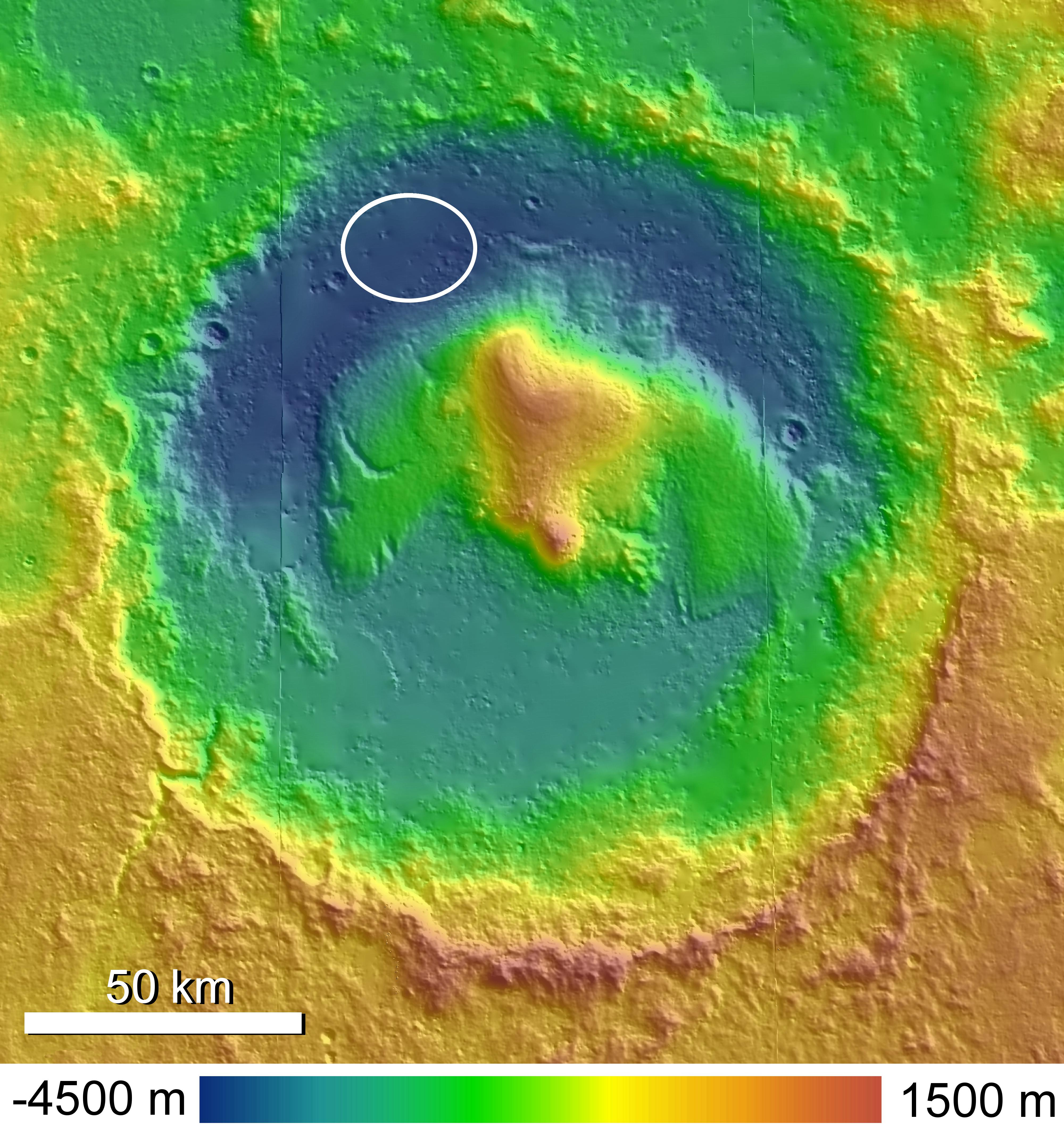
Colorized shaded relief map of the crater Gale. The general landing area for Curiosity on the northwestern crater floor, named Aeolis Palus, is circled. (HRSC data)

Gale, named for Walter F. Gale (1865–1945), an amateur astronomer from Australia, spans 154 km (96 mi) in diameter and holds a mountain, Aeolis Mons (informally named "Mount Sharp" to pay tribute to geologist Robert P. Sharp) rising 18,000 ft (5,500 m) from the crater floor, higher than Mount Rainier rises above Seattle. Gale is roughly the size of Connecticut and Rhode Island.

The crater formed when an asteroid or comet hit Mars in its early history, about 3.5 to 3.8 billion years ago. The impactor punched a hole in the terrain, and the subsequent explosion ejected rocks and soil that landed around the crater. Layering in the central mound (Aeolis Mons) suggests it is the surviving remnant of an extensive sequence of deposits. Some scientists believe the crater filled in with sediments and, over time, the relentless Martian winds carved Aeolis Mons, which today rises about 5.5 km (3.4 mi) above the floor of Gale—three times higher than the Grand Canyon is deep.

At 10:32 p.m. PDT on August 5, 2012 (1:32 a.m. EDT on August 6, 2012), the Mars Science Laboratory rover Curiosity landed on Mars at 4.5°S 137.4°E, at the foot of the layered mountain inside Gale. Curiosity landed within a landing ellipse approximately 7 km (4.3 mi) by 20 km (12 mi). The landing ellipse is about 4,400 m (14,400 ft) below Martian "sea level" (defined as the average elevation around the equator). The expected near-surface atmospheric temperatures at the landing site during Curiosity's primary mission (1 Martian year or 687 Earth days) are from −90 to 0 °C (−130 to 32 °F).

Scientists chose Gale as the landing site for Curiosity because it has many signs that water was present over its history. The crater's geology is notable for containing both clays and sulfate minerals, which form in water under different conditions and may also preserve signs of past life. The history of water at Gale, as recorded in its rocks, is giving Curiosity many clues to study as it pieces together whether Mars ever could have been a habitat for microbes. Gale contains a number of fans and deltas that provide information about lake levels in the past, including: Pancake Delta, Western Delta, Farah Vallis delta and the Peace Vallis Fan.

== Geology ==
Orbital THEMIS and topography data, plus visible and near-infrared images, were used to make a geological map of the crater. CRISM data indicated the lower bench unit was composed of interstratified clay and sulfates. Curiosity explored the stratigraphy of the crater consisting of the Bradbury Group and the overlying Mount Sharp Group. Formations within the Bradbury Group include the Yellowknife and Kimberley, while the Murray Formation is at the base of the Mount Sharp Group. The Bradbury Group consists of fluvial conglomerates, cross-bedded sandstones, and mudstones reflecting a basaltic provenance. Sandstone clinoforms indicate deltaic deposits. The Murray Formation is a laminated mudstone overlain by a cross-bedded or clinoform sandstone, though in places the base is a conglomerate. Thus, the formation is interpreted to have been deposited in a lacustrine environment adjacent to a fluvial-deltaic one. The Murray Formation is overlain by clay and sulfate-bearing strata.

An unusual feature of Gale is an enormous mound of "sedimentary debris" around its central peak, officially named Aeolis Mons (popularly known as "Mount Sharp") rising 5.5 km (18,000 ft) above the northern crater floor and 4.5 km (15,000 ft) above the southern crater floor—slightly taller than the southern rim of the crater itself. The mound is composed of layered material and may have been laid down over a period of around 2 billion years. The origin of this mound is not known with certainty, but research suggests it is the eroded remnant of sedimentary layers that once filled the crater completely, possibly originally deposited on a lakebed. Evidence of fluvial activity was observed early on in the mission at the Shaler outcrop (first observed on Sol 120, investigated extensively between Sols 309-324). Observations made by the rover Curiosity at the Pahrump Hills strongly support the lake hypothesis: sedimentary facies including sub mm-scale horizontally-laminated mudstones, with interbedded fluvial crossbeds are representative of sediments which accumulate in lakes, or on the margins of lakes which grow and contract in response to lake-level. These lake-bed mudstones are referred to as the Murray Formation, and form a significant amount of the Mount Sharp group. The Siccar Point group (named after the famous unconformity at Siccar Point) overlies the Mount Sharp group, and the two units are separated by a major unconformity which dips toward the North. At present, the Stimson formation is the only stratigraphic unit within the Siccar Point group which has been investigated in-detail by Curiosity. The Stimson formation represents the preserved expression of a dry aeolian dune field, where sediment was transported towards the north, or northeast by palaeowinds within the crater. In the Emerson plateau area (from Marias Pass, to East Glacier), the outcrops are characterised predominantly by simple cross-sets, deposited by simple sinuous-crested dunes, with heights up to ~10 m. To the south, at the Murray buttes, the outcrop are characterised by compound cross-sets, with a hierarchy of bounding surfaces migration of small dunes superimposed on the lee-slope of a large dune known as a "draa". These draas have estimates heights of ~40 m, and migrated toward the north, while superimposed dunes migrated toward the east-northeast. Further to the south, at the Greenheugh pediment, compound and simple cross-sets consistent with aeolian depositional processes have been observed in the pediment capping unit. Observations made during the ascent of the Greenheugh pediment between Sols 2665-2734 demonstrated that the pediment capping unit has sedimentary textures, facies and architecture that are consistent with the rest of the Stimson formation. Furthermore, analysis of sedimentary facies and architecture provided evidence which indicates fluctuating wind directions, from a seasonal temporal scale - recorded by interstratified windripple and avalanche strata, through to millennial time scales recorded by reversal of the sediment transport direction. These wind reversals suggest variable and changeable atmospheric circulation during this time.

Observations of possible cross-bedded strata on the upper mound suggest aeolian processes, but the origin of the lower mound layers remains ambiguous.

In February 2019, NASA scientists reported that the Mars Curiosity rover had determined, for the first time, the density of Mount Sharp in Gale, thereby establishing a clearer understanding of how the mountain was formed.

Gale is located at about 5.4°S 137.8°E on Mars.

== Spacecraft exploration ==
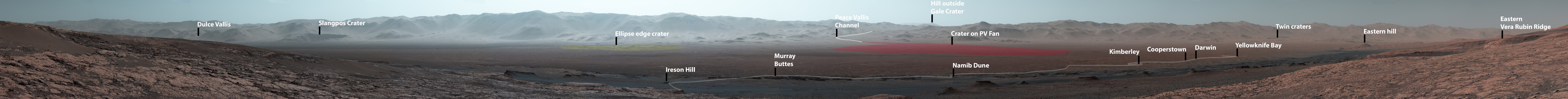
Curiosity's view of the interior of Gale from the slopes (at 327 m (1,073 ft) elevation) of Mount Sharp (video (1:53)) (October 25, 2017)

Numerous channels eroded into the flanks of the crater's central mound could give access to the layers for study. Gale is the landing site of the Curiosity rover, delivered by the Mars Science Laboratory spacecraft, which was launched November 26, 2011 and landed on Mars inside the crater Gale on the plains of Aeolis Palus on August 6, 2012. Gale was previously a candidate landing site for the 2003 Mars Exploration Rover mission, and has been one of four prospective sites for ESA's ExoMars.

In December 2012, scientists working on the Mars Science Laboratory mission announced that an extensive soil analysis of Martian soil performed by Curiosity showed evidence of water molecules, sulphur and chlorine, as well as hints of organic compounds. However, terrestrial contamination, as the source of the organic compounds, could not be ruled out.

On September 26, 2013, NASA scientists reported that Curiosity detected "abundant, easily accessible" water (1.5 to 3 weight percent) in soil samples at the Rocknest region of Aeolis Palus in Gale. In addition, the rover found two principal soil types: a fine-grained mafic type and a locally derived, coarse-grained felsic type. The mafic type, similar to other martian soils and martian dust, was associated with hydration of the amorphous phases of the soil. Also, perchlorates, the presence of which may make detection of life-related organic molecules difficult, were found at the Curiosity landing site (and earlier at the more polar site of the Phoenix lander) suggesting a "global distribution of these salts". NASA also reported that Jake M rock, a rock encountered by Curiosity on the way to Glenelg, was a mugearite and very similar to terrestrial mugearite rocks.

On December 9, 2013, NASA reported that, based on evidence from Curiosity studying Aeolis Palus, Gale contained an ancient freshwater lake which could have been a hospitable environment for microbial life.

On December 16, 2014, NASA reported detecting, by the Curiosity rover at Gale, an unusual increase, then decrease, in the amounts of methane in the atmosphere of the planet Mars; in addition, organic chemicals were detected in powder drilled from a rock. Also, based on deuterium to hydrogen ratio studies, much of the water at Gale on Mars was found to have been lost during ancient times, before the lakebed in the crater was formed; afterwards, large amounts of water continued to be lost.

On October 8, 2015, NASA confirmed that lakes and streams existed in Gale 3.3 to 3.8 billion years ago delivering sediments to build up the lower layers of Mount Sharp.

On June 1, 2017, NASA reported that the Curiosity rover provided evidence of an ancient lake in Gale on Mars that could have been favorable for microbial life; the ancient lake was stratified, with shallows rich in oxidants and depths poor in oxidants; and, the ancient lake provided many different types of microbe-friendly environments at the same time. NASA further reported that the Curiosity rover will continue to explore higher and younger layers of Mount Sharp in order to determine how the lake environment in ancient times on Mars became the drier environment in more modern times.

On August 5, 2017, NASA celebrated the fifth anniversary of the Curiosity rover mission landing, and related exploratory accomplishments, on the planet Mars. (Videos: Curiosity's First Five Years (02:07); Curiosity's POV: Five Years Driving (05:49); Curiosity's Discoveries About Gale Crater (02:54))

On June 7, 2018, NASA's Curiosity made two significant discoveries in Gale. Organic molecules preserved in 3.5 billion-year-old bedrock and seasonal variations in the level of methane in the atmosphere further support the theory that past conditions may have been conducive to life. It is possible that a form of water-rock chemistry might have generated the methane, but scientists cannot rule out the possibility of biological origins. Methane previously had been detected in Mars's atmosphere in large, unpredictable plumes. This new result shows that low levels of methane within Gale repeatedly peak in warm, summer months and drop in the winter every year. Organic carbon concentrations were discovered on the order of 10 parts per million or more. This is close to the amount observed in Martian meteorites and about 100 times greater than prior analysis of organic carbon on Mars's surface. Some of the molecules identified include thiophenes, benzene, toluene, and small carbon chains, such as propane or butene.

On November 4, 2018, geologists presented evidence, based on studies in Gale by the Curiosity rover, that there was plenty of water on early Mars. In January 2020, researchers have found certain minerals, made of carbon and oxygen, in rocks at Gale, which may have formed in an ice-covered lake during a cold stage between warmer periods, or after Mars lost most of its atmosphere and became permanently cold.

On November 5, 2020, researchers concluded based on data observed by Curiosity rover that Gale experienced megafloods which occurred around 4 billion years ago, taking into consideration antidunes reaching the height of 10 meters (33 ft), which were formed by flood waters at least 24 meters (79 ft) deep with a velocity of 10 meters per second (22 mph).

Research published in August, 2023 found evidence that liquid water may have existed over thousands to millions of years and not just when an impact or volcano erupted. Shapes in a field of hexagonal ridges revealed that water appeared and then went away many times. The water did not just result from ground ice melting from something like an asteroid impact. To make these ridges many cycles of water saturating the surface and then drying were required. Chemicals were deposited by mineral-rich fluids in cracks. The minerals hardened such that they were harder than the rock around them. Later, when erosion took place, ridges were exposed.

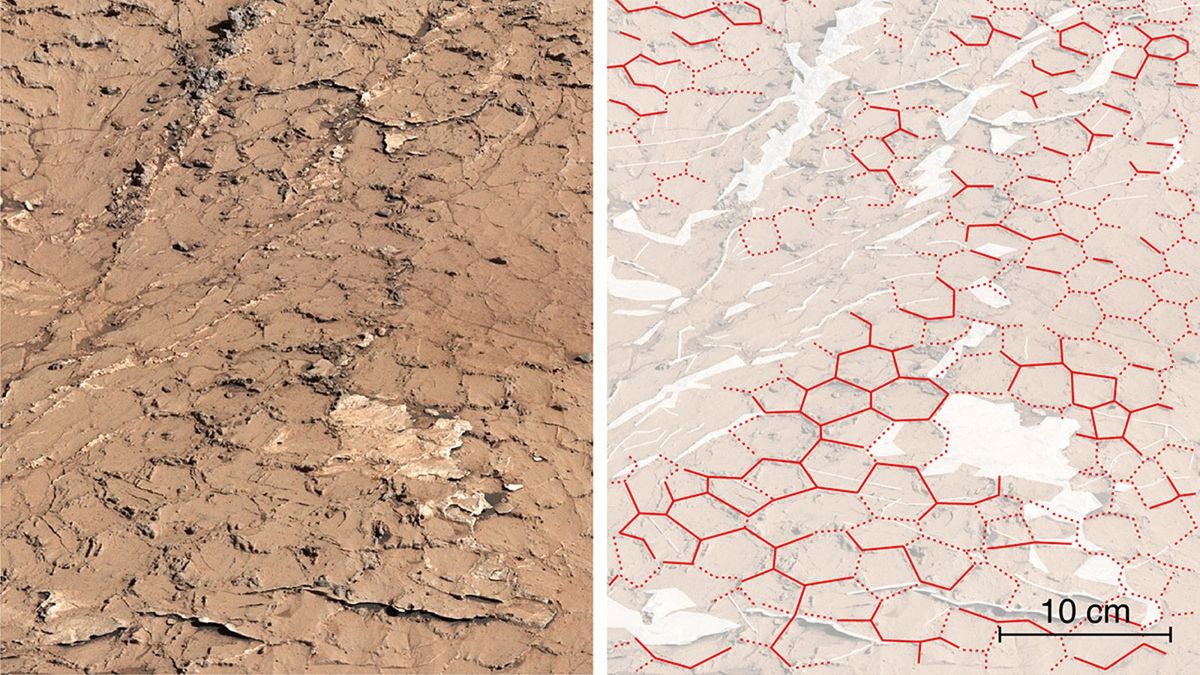
Mudcracks as seen by Curiosity in Gale. Shapes imply that water saturated the area and dried out many times; hence, the existence of water was not just a one-time, short-lived event.

This discovery is significant. Much evidence exists to show that impacts and volcanic activity could melt ground ice to make liquid water. However, that water may not last long enough for life to develop. This new finding shows here it is not the case–water stayed for some time. Also, with water coming and going on a regular pace, there is a better chance of more complex organic compounds being produced. As water evaporates chemicals are concentrated and have a better chance of combining. For example when amino acids are concentrated they are more likely to link up to form proteins.

Curiosity found features that computer simulations show could be caused by past streams. They have been called benches and noses. The "noses" stick out like noses. Computer simulations show that these shapes can be produced by rivers.

In July 2024 the Rover cracked open a rock with its wheel and found crystals of sulfur. Minerals containing sulfur were discovered, but never the pure element. It was found in Gediz Vallis.

Research published in February 2025 described wave ripples in Gale that show that liquid water flowed there. The ripples were found in two different time periods. Calculations based on their shape and sizes revealed that they were formed in shallow moving water. The water could have been as deep as 2 meters. Before this study, it was thought that any exposed body of water would quickly develop a sheet of ice at the top.

The first organic molecules found in Gale were simple aromatic, S-heterocycles, and aliphatic organic molecules. In research done by a very large group of scientists, over 20 organic molecules from clay-bearing sandstones were described. They were discovered in the ~3.5-billion-year-old Knockfarrill Hill member of Glen Torridon in Gale by the Sample Analysis at Mars instrument suite onboard the Curiosity rover. It cannot be determined how these molecules were made. They could be exogenous (e.g., meteoritic, cometary, or interplanetary dust particles) or endogenous (e.g., abiotically or biologically produced).

== Images ==
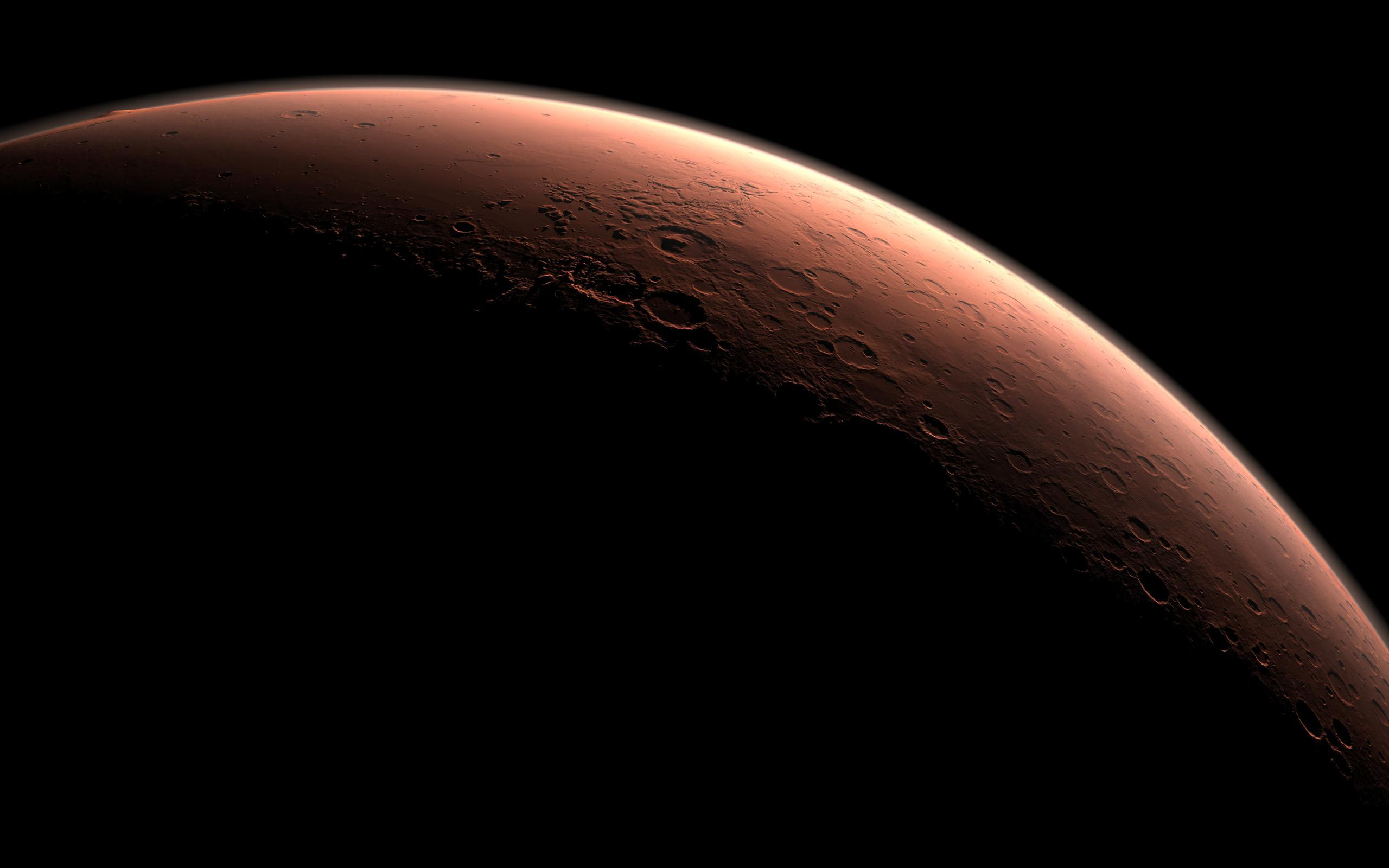
Mars between day and night, with an area containing Gale crater, beginning to catch the morning light

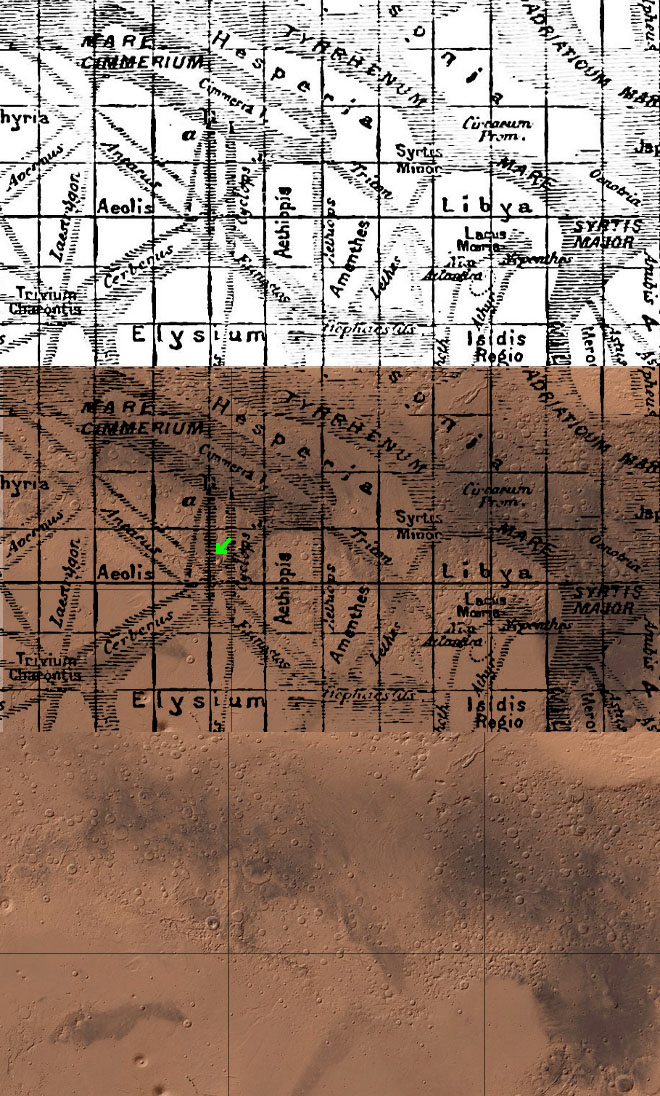
Maps of Mars - old and new - Gale is noted in the middle of the image

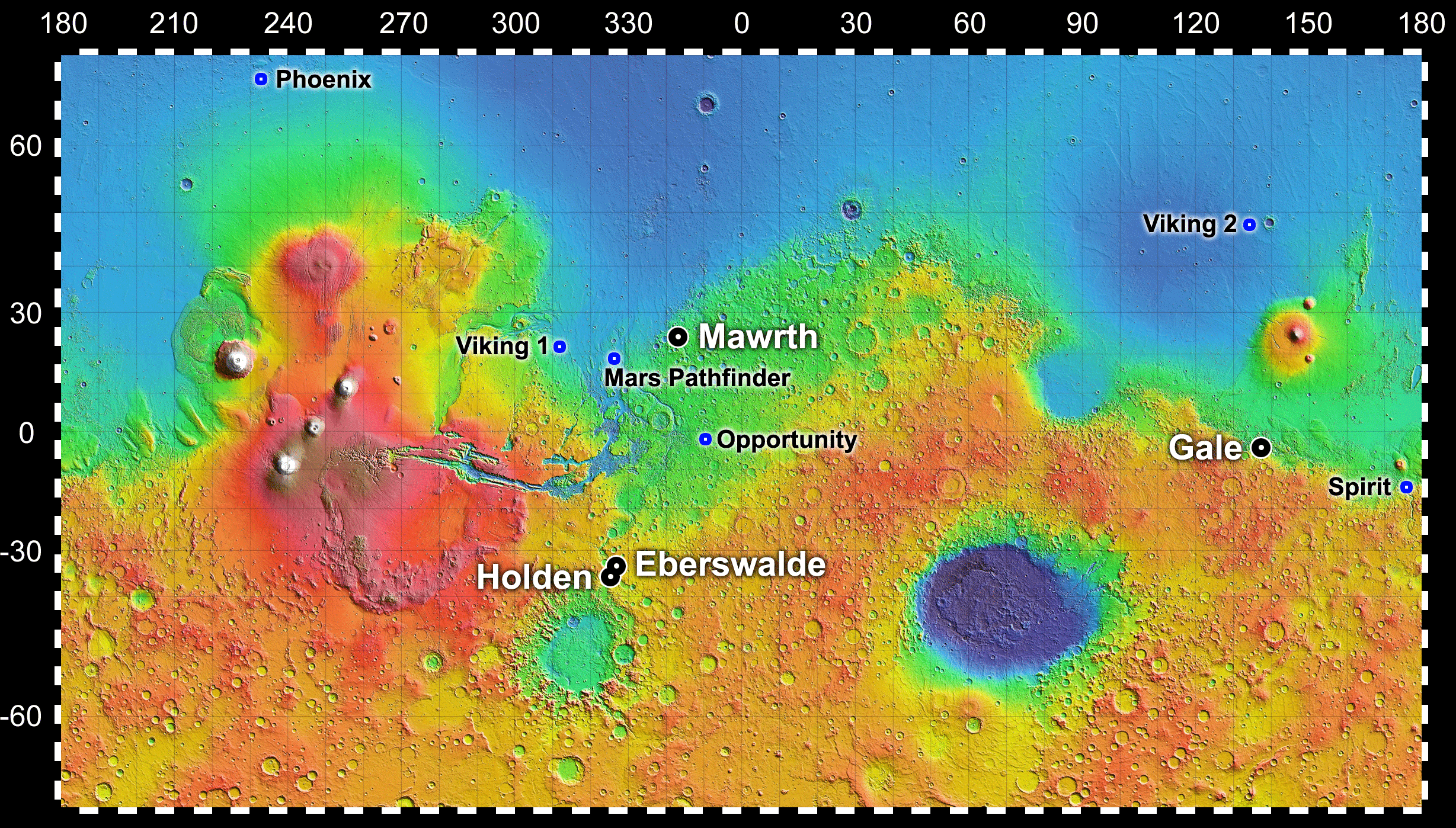
Map of actual (and proposed) rover landing sites including Gale

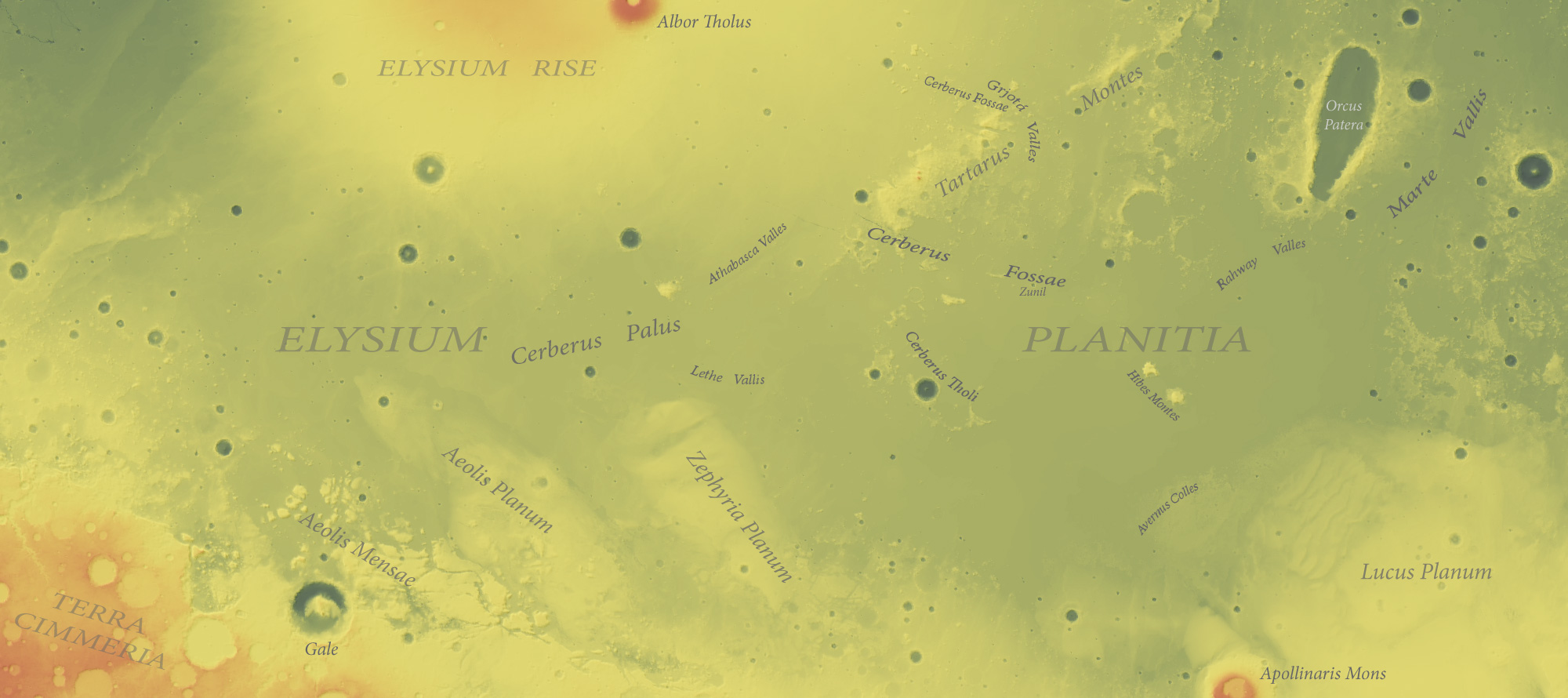
Map of Elysium Planitia - Gale is in the lower left - Aeolis Mons is in the middle of the crater

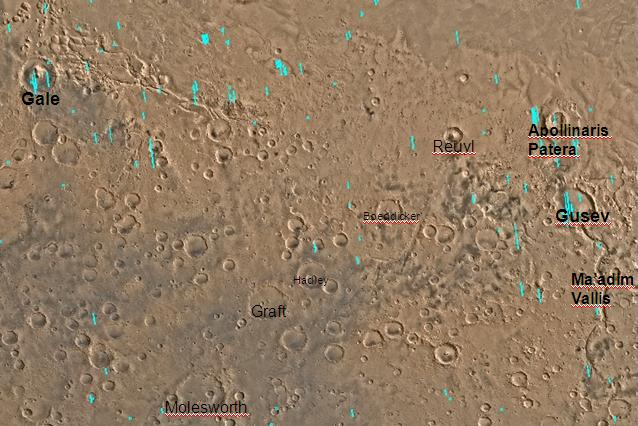
Map of Aeolis quadrangle - Gale is in the upper left - Aeolis Mons is in the middle of the crater

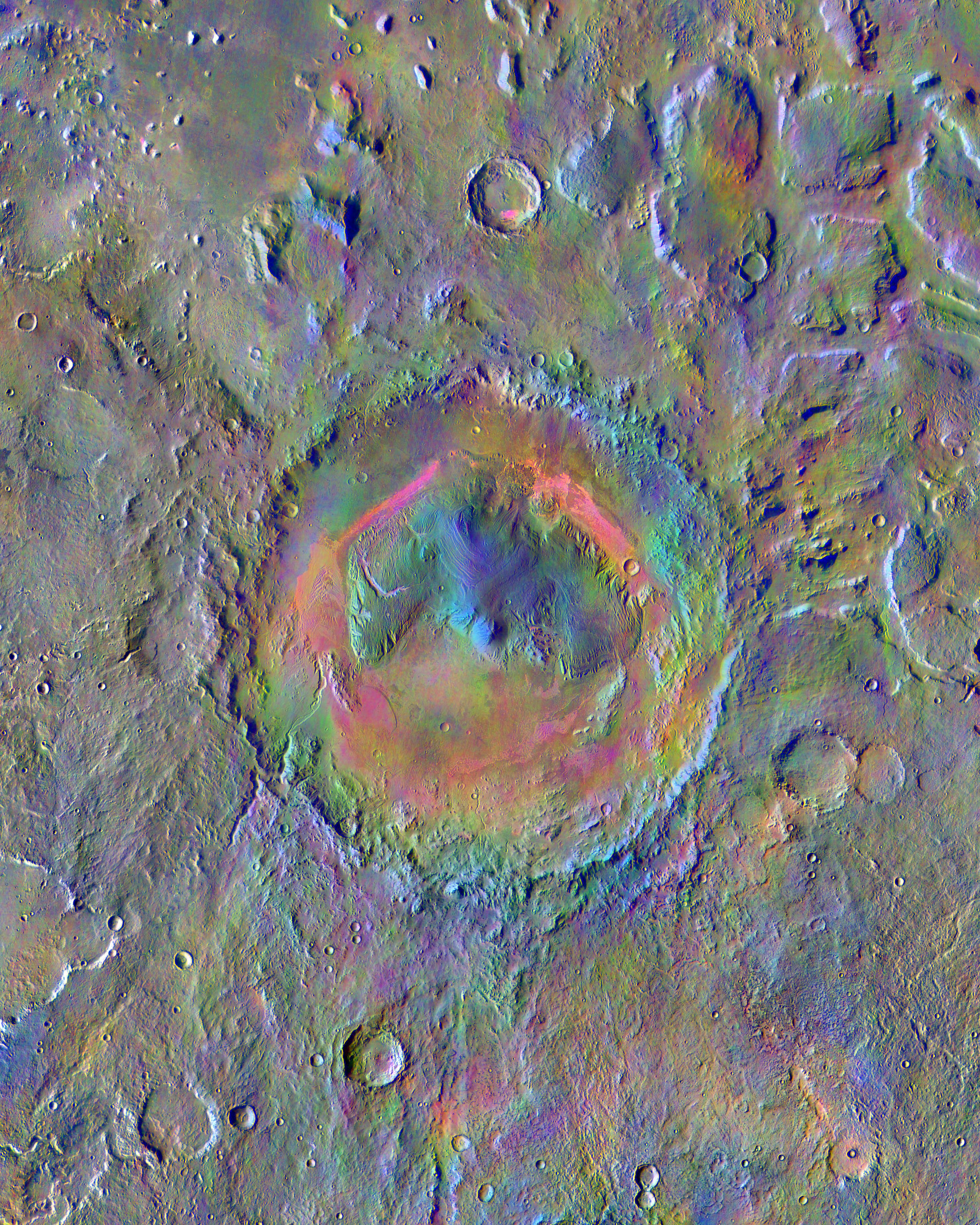
Gale crater - surface materials (false colors; THEMIS; 2001 Mars Odyssey)

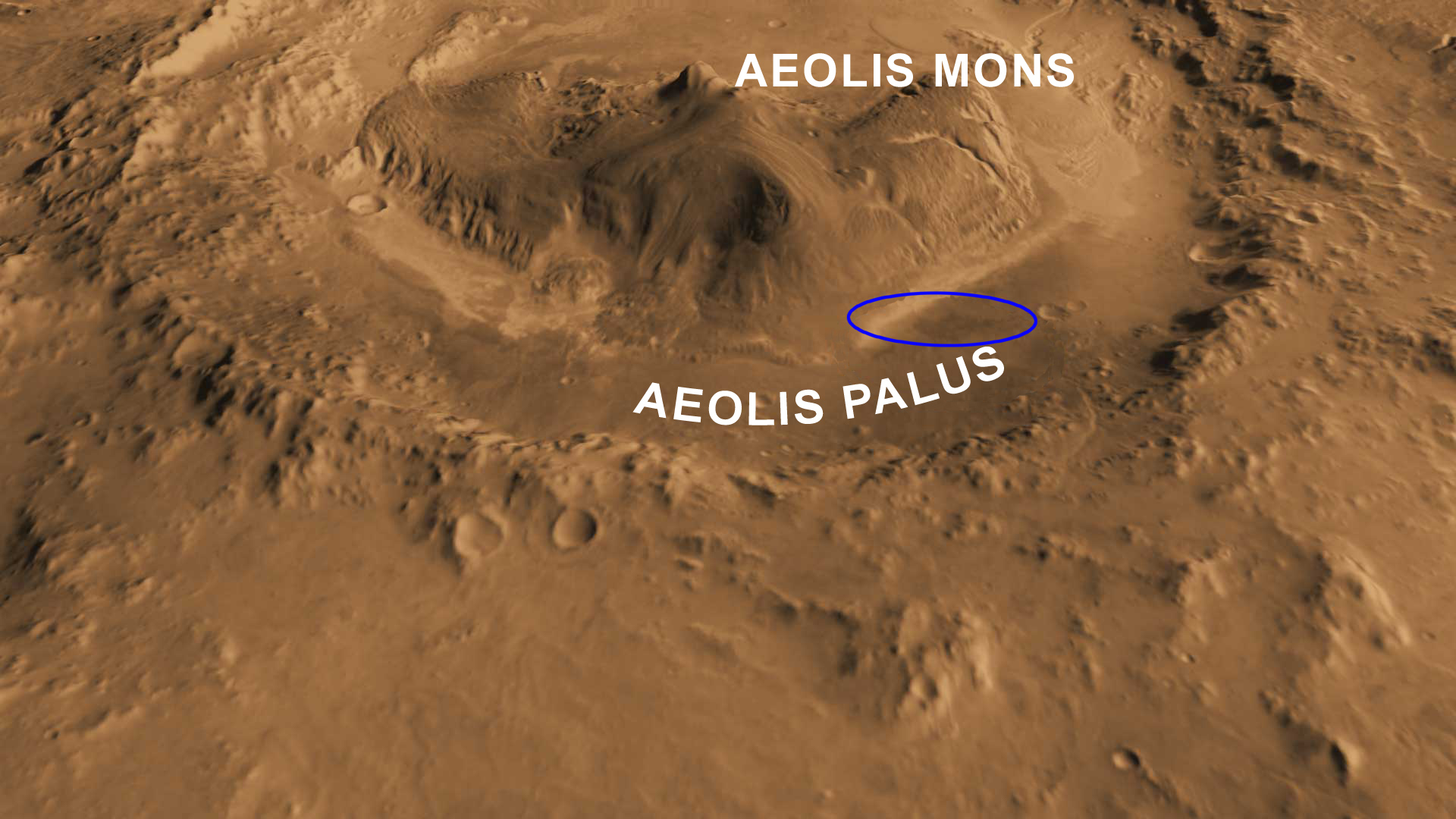
Gale crater landing site is within Aeolis Palus near Aeolis Mons - north is down.

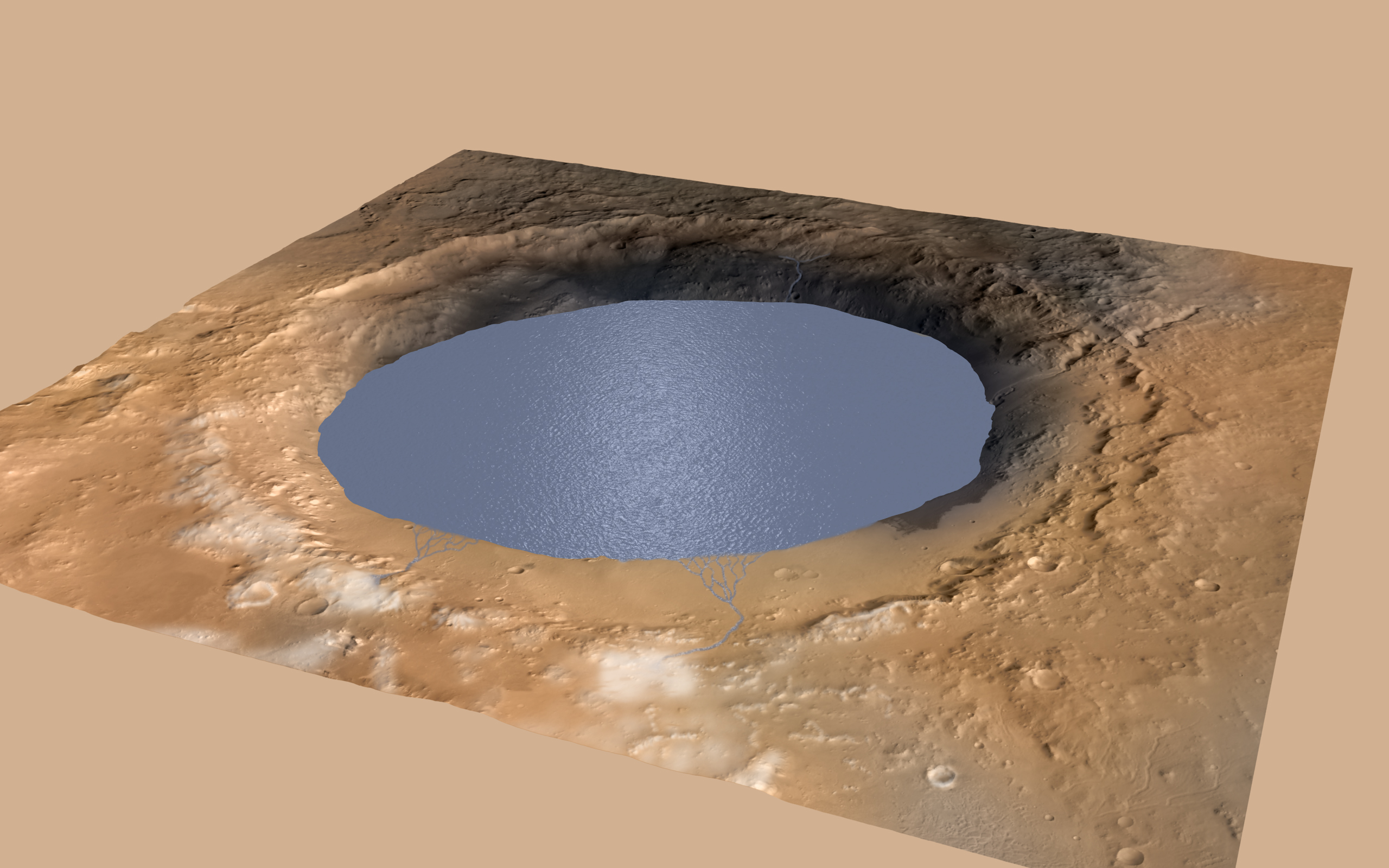
Ancient Lake fills Gale Crater on Mars (simulated view).

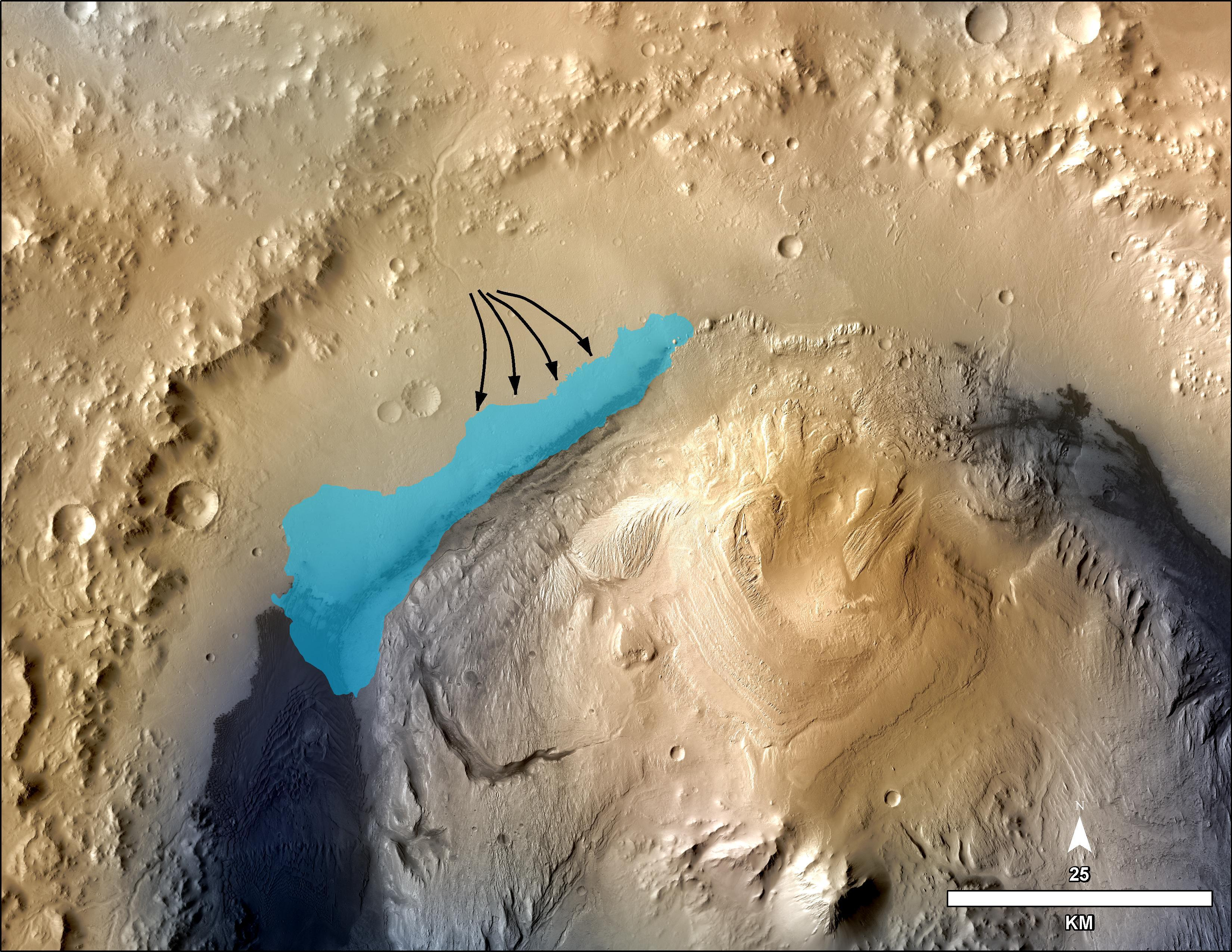
Estimated size of ancient lake on Aeolis Palus in Gale

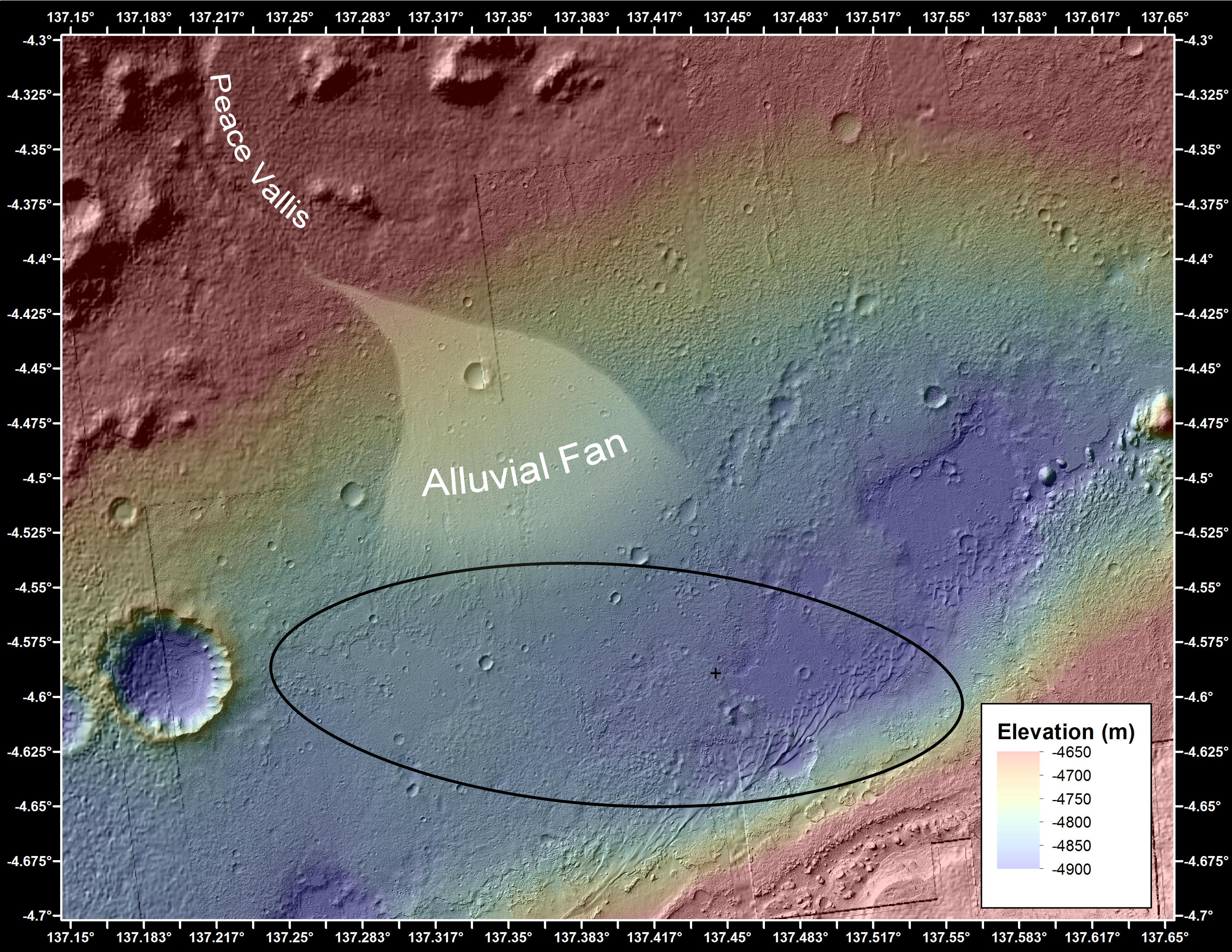
Peace Vallis and alluvial fan near the Curiosity rover landing ellipse and site (noted by +)

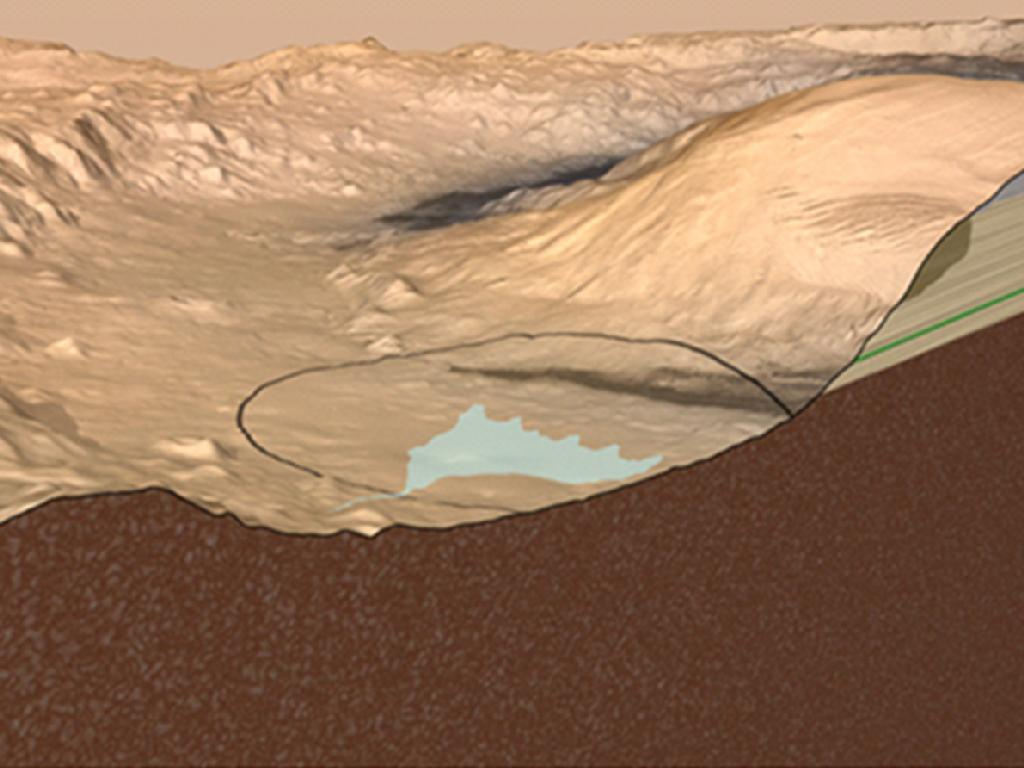
Gale crater - landing site is noted - also, alluvial fan (blue) and sediment layers in Aeolis Mons (cutaway)

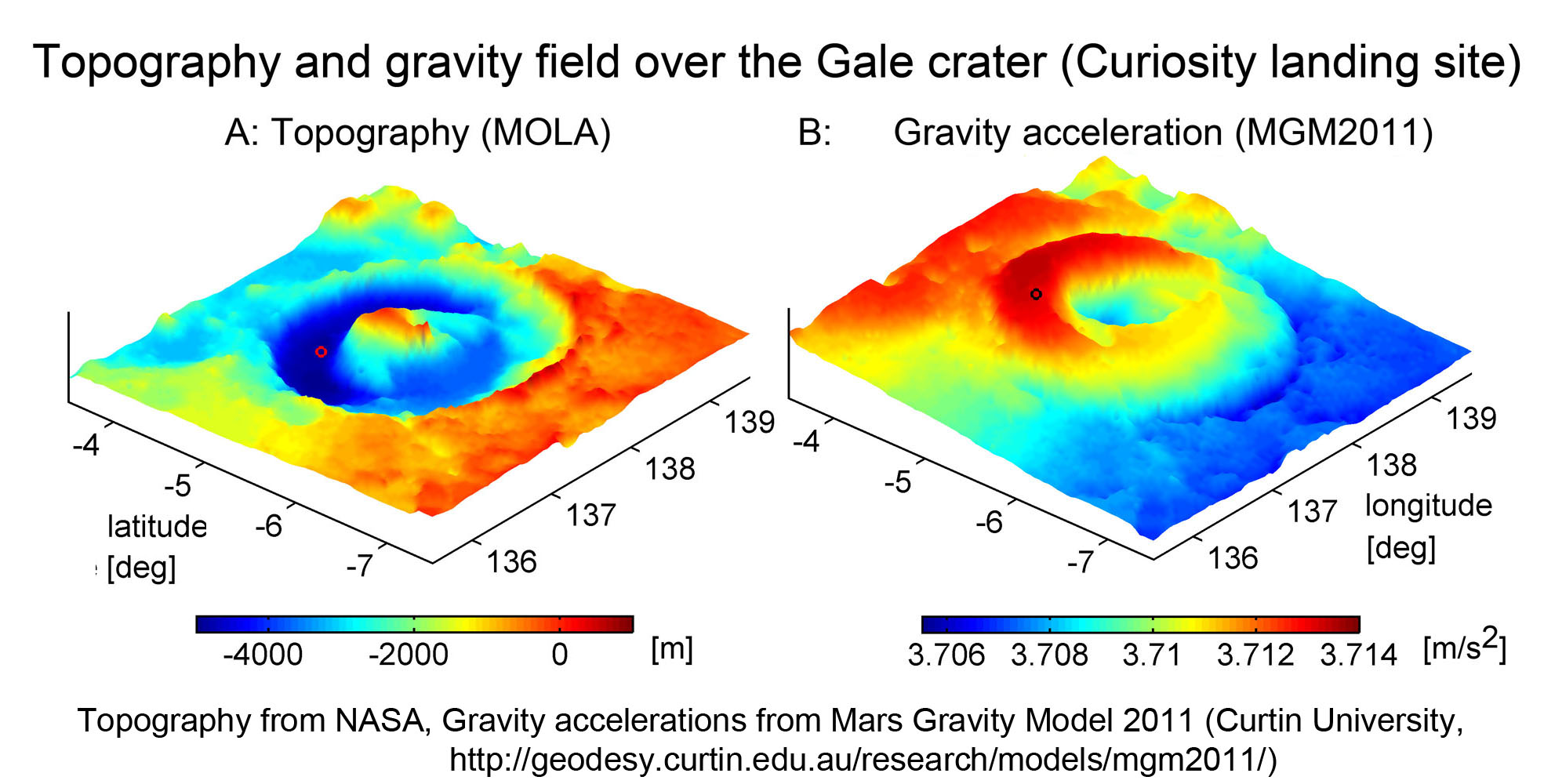
Gale crater - topographic and gravity field maps - landing site is noted - Mars gravity model 2011

Aeolis Mons may have formed from the erosion of sediment layers that once filled Gale.

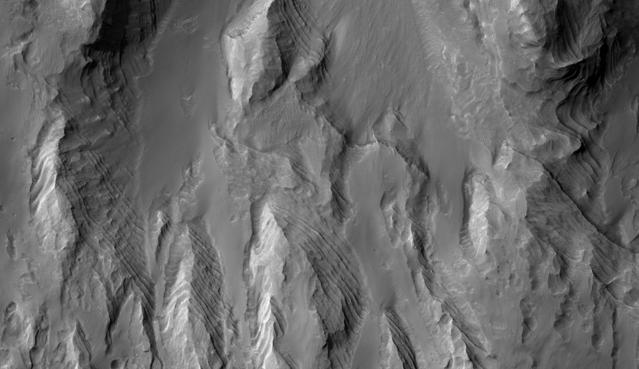
Gale sediment layers may have formed by lake or windblown particle deposition.

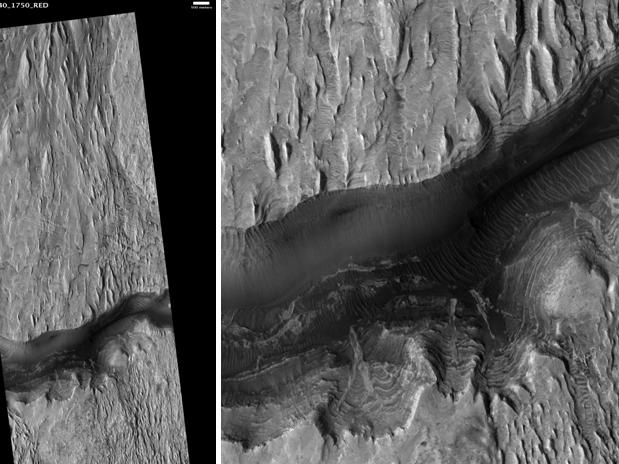
Gale's "Grand Canyon", as seen by HiRISE - scale bar is 500 meters long

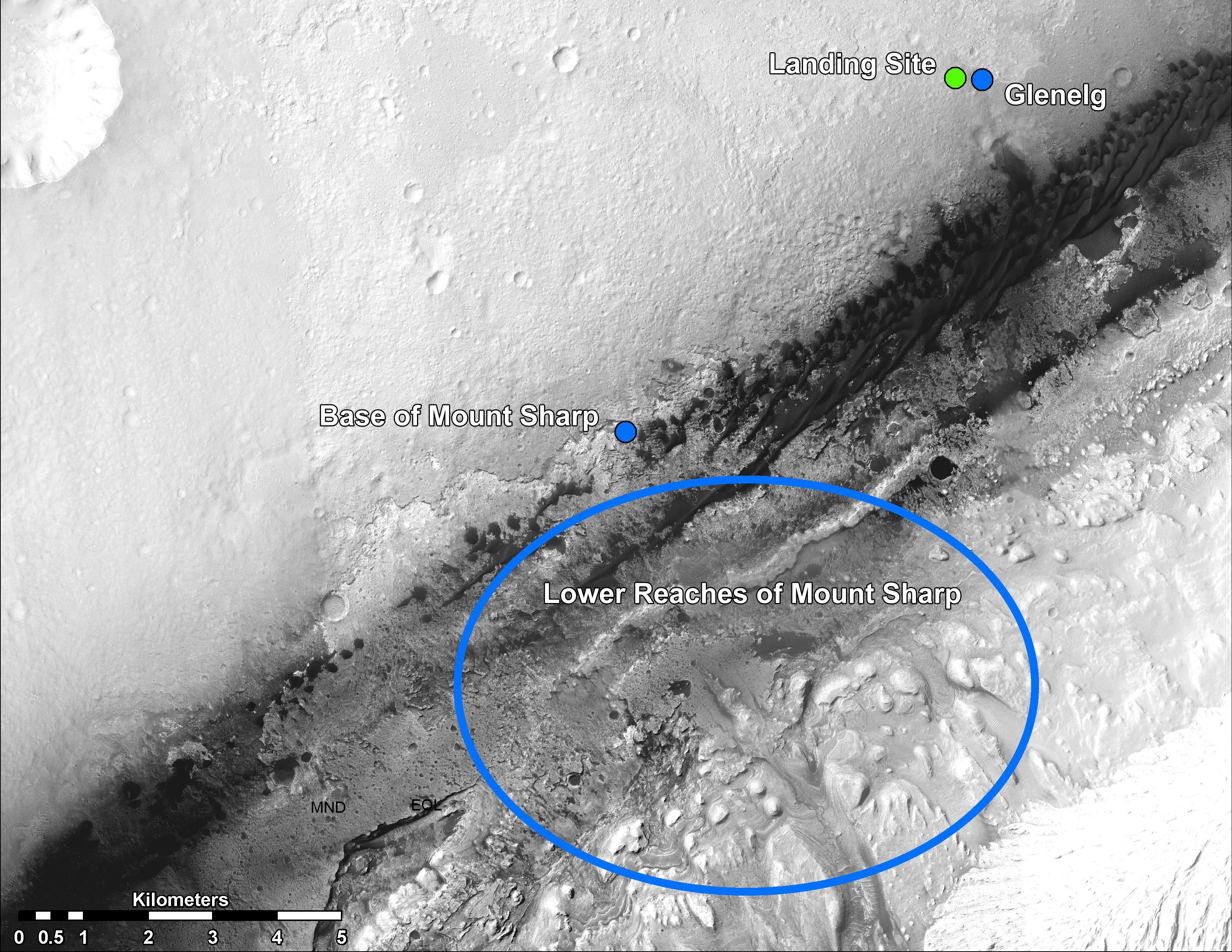
Curiosity landing site (green dot) - blue dot marks "Glenelg Intrigue" - blue spot marks base of Aeolis Mons - a planned area of study

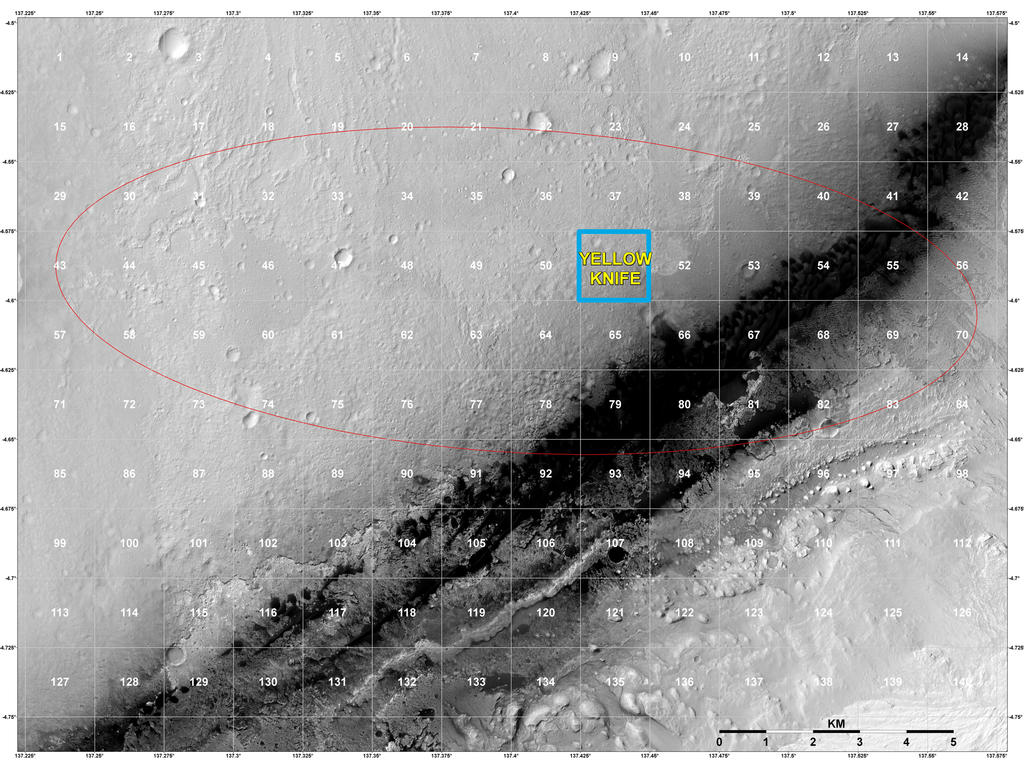
Curiosity landing site - "quad map" includes "Yellowknife" Quad 51 of Aeolis Palus in Gale crater

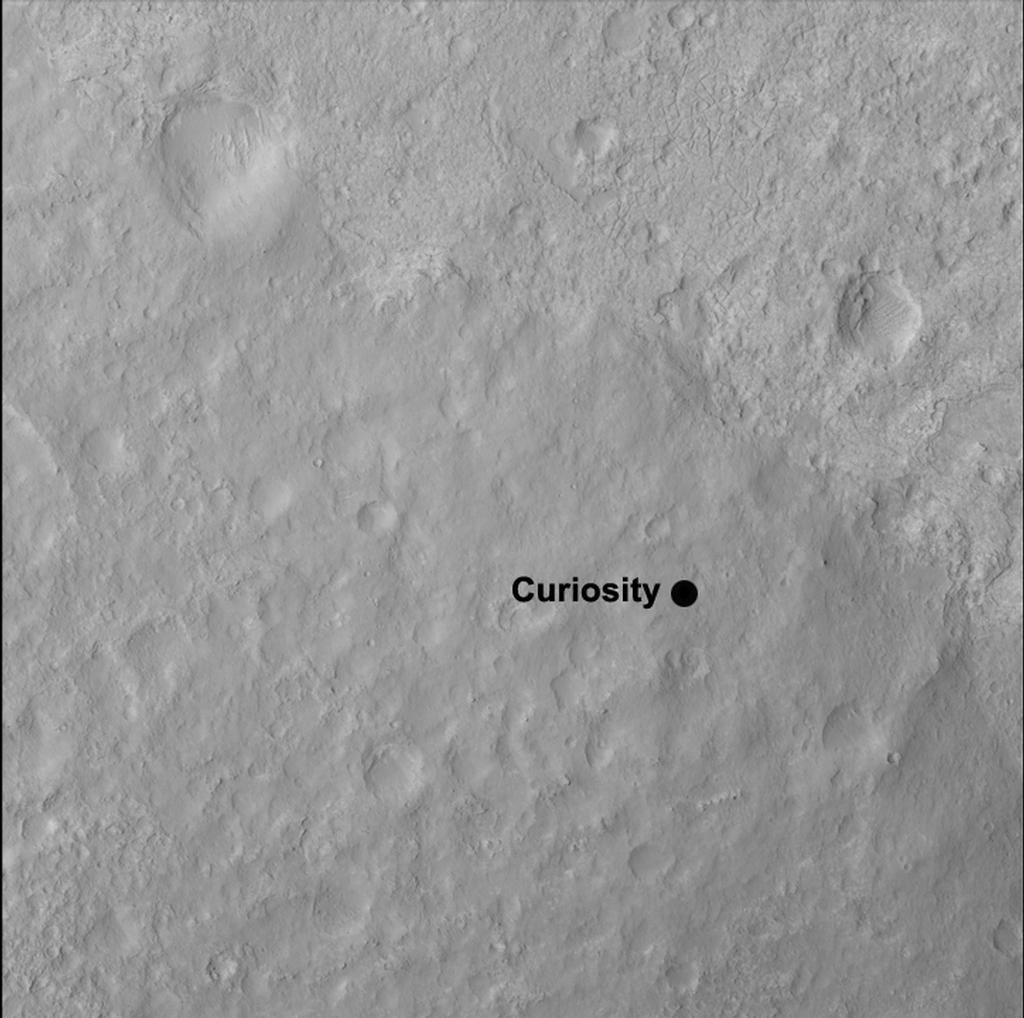
Curiosity landing site - "Yellowknife" Quad 51 (1-mi-by-1-mi) of Aeolis Palus in Gale

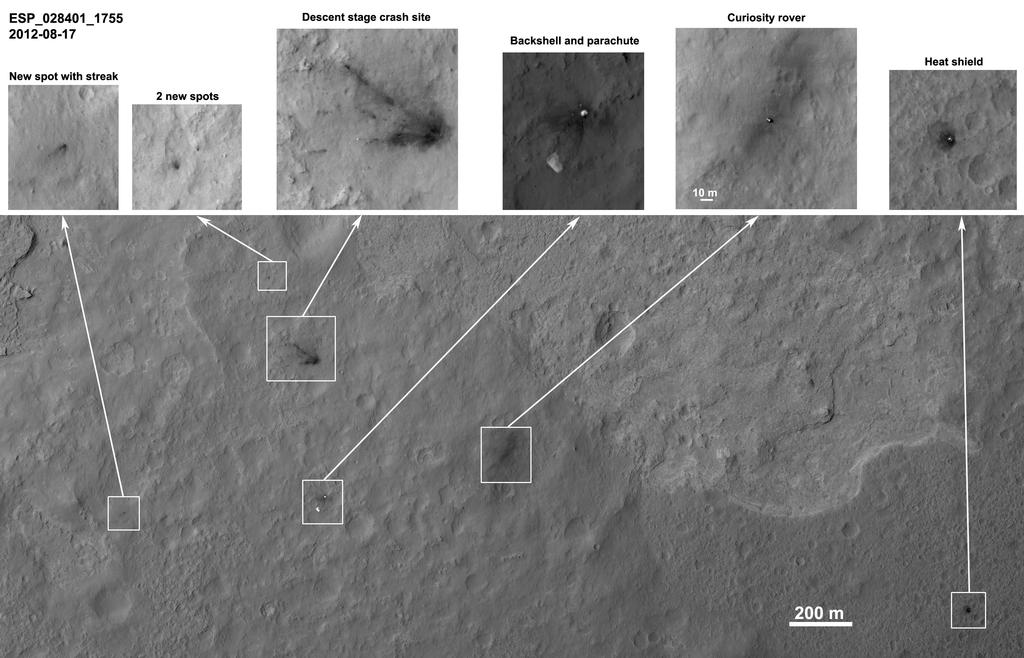
MSL debris field viewed by HiRISE on August 17, 2012 - parachute is 615 m (2,018 ft) from the rover (3-D: rover and parachute)

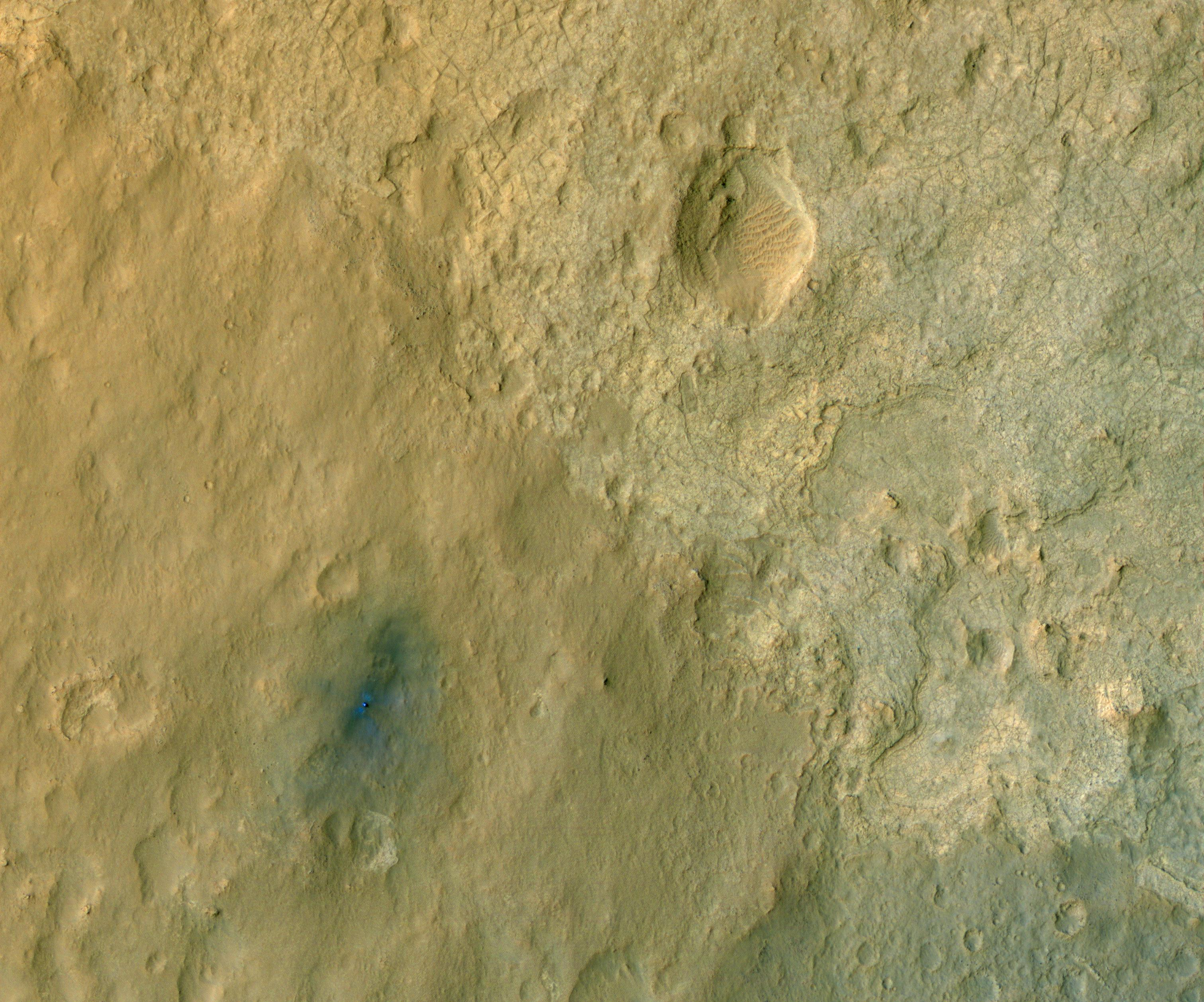
Curiosity landing site ("Bradbury Landing") viewed by HiRISE (MRO) (August 14, 2012)

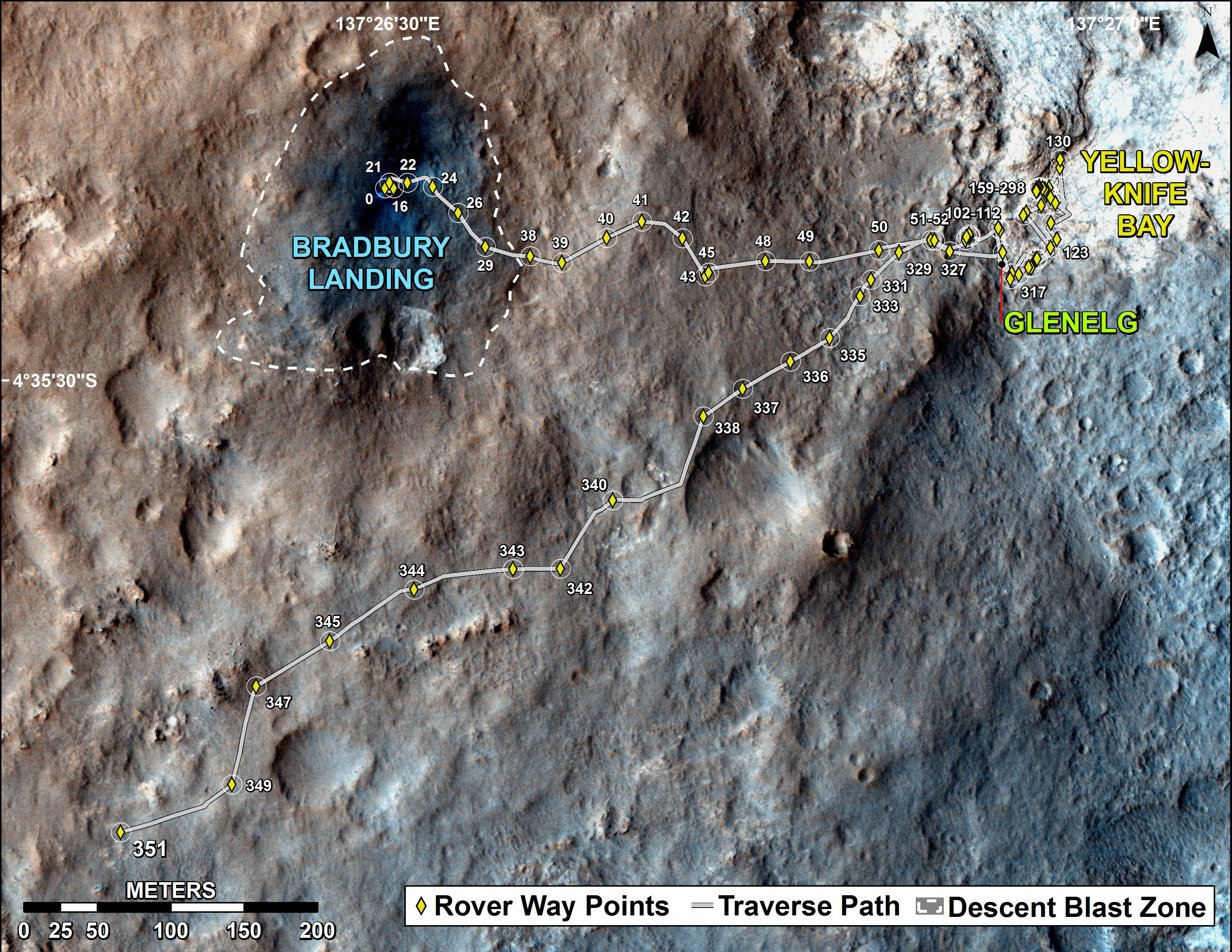
First-year and first-mile traverse map of Curiosity on Mars (August 1, 2013) (3-D)

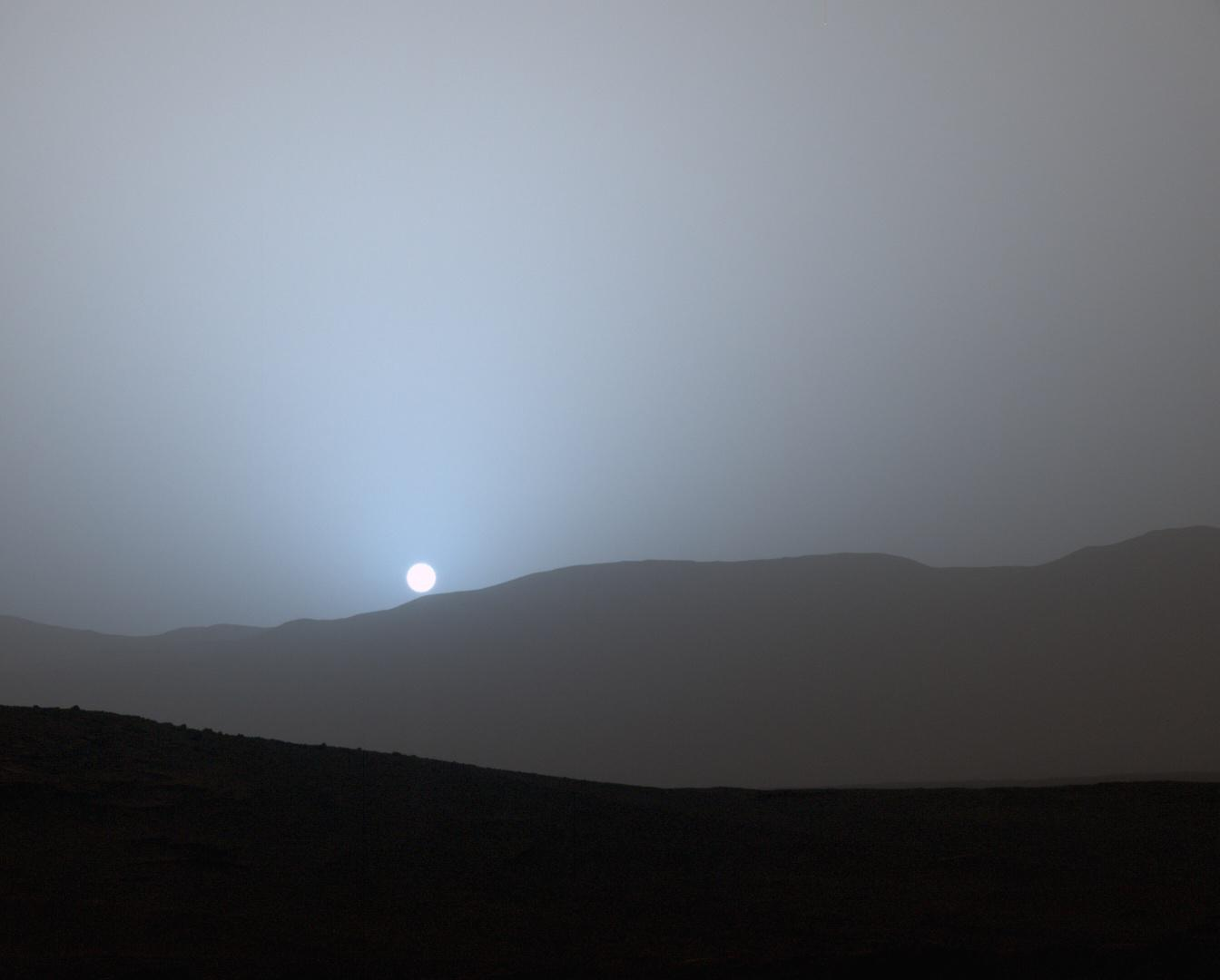
Sunset - Gale crater (April 15, 2015)

Sunset (animated) - Gale crater (April 15, 2015)

== Surface images ==
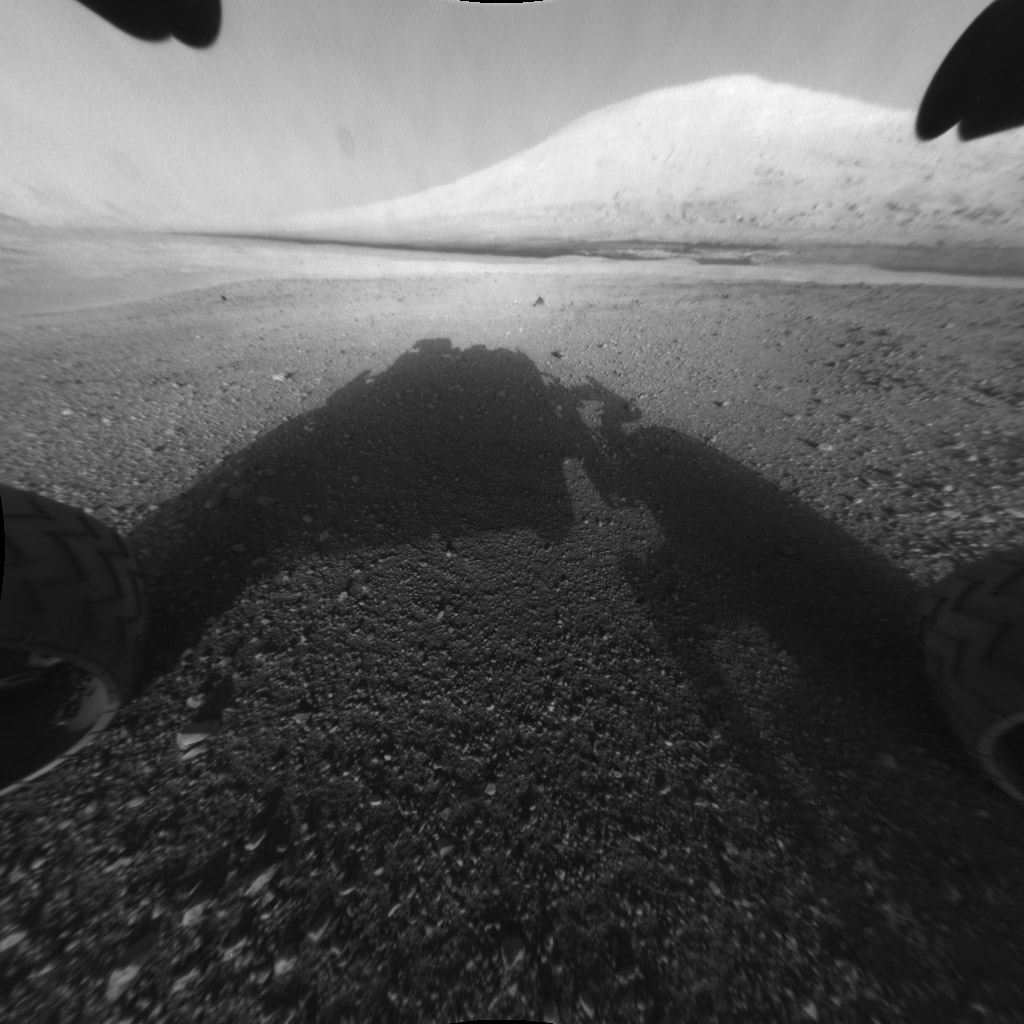
Aeolis Palus and Aeolis Mons in Gale as viewed by Curiosity (August 6, 2012)

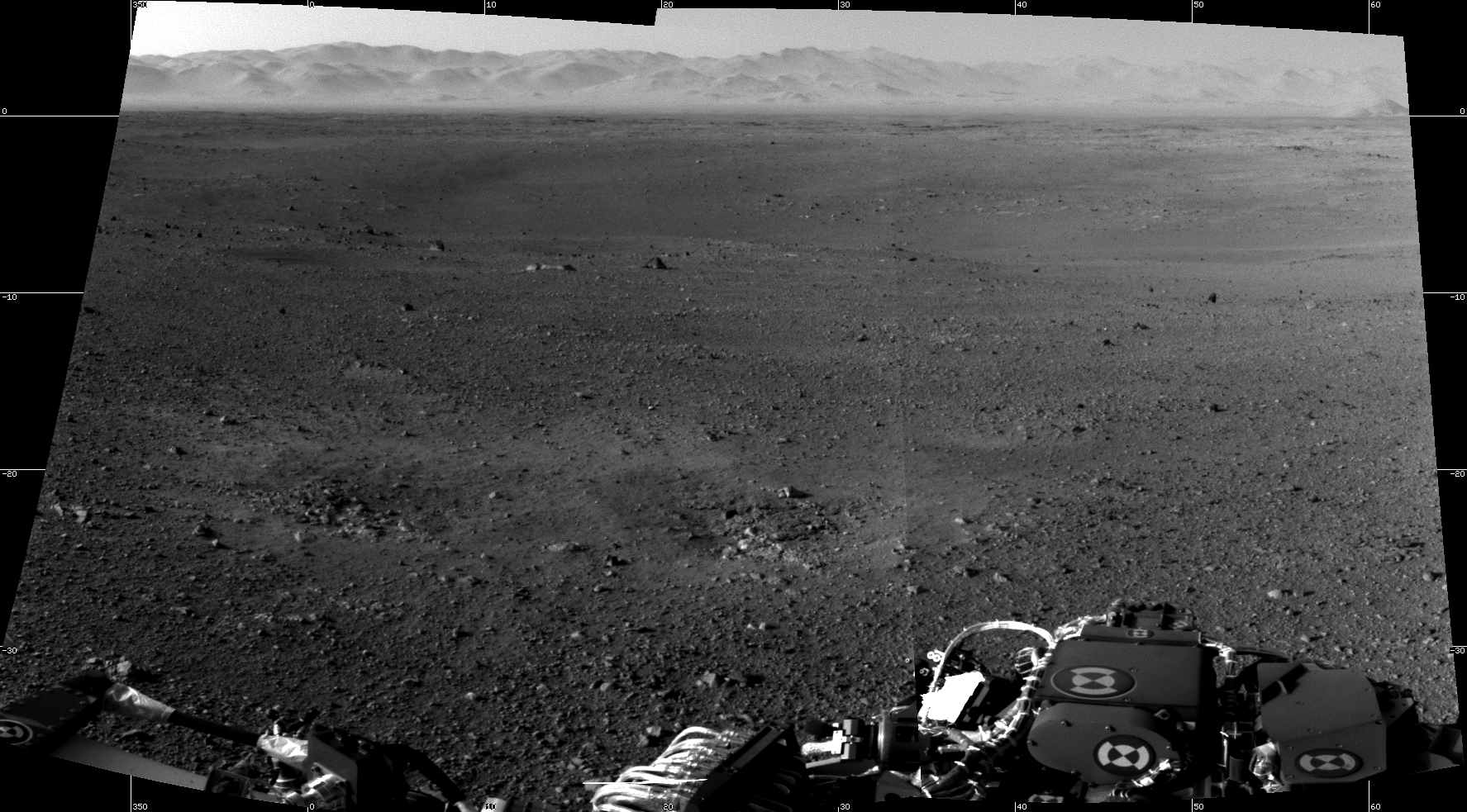
The rim and floor of Gale as viewed by Curiosity (August 9, 2012)

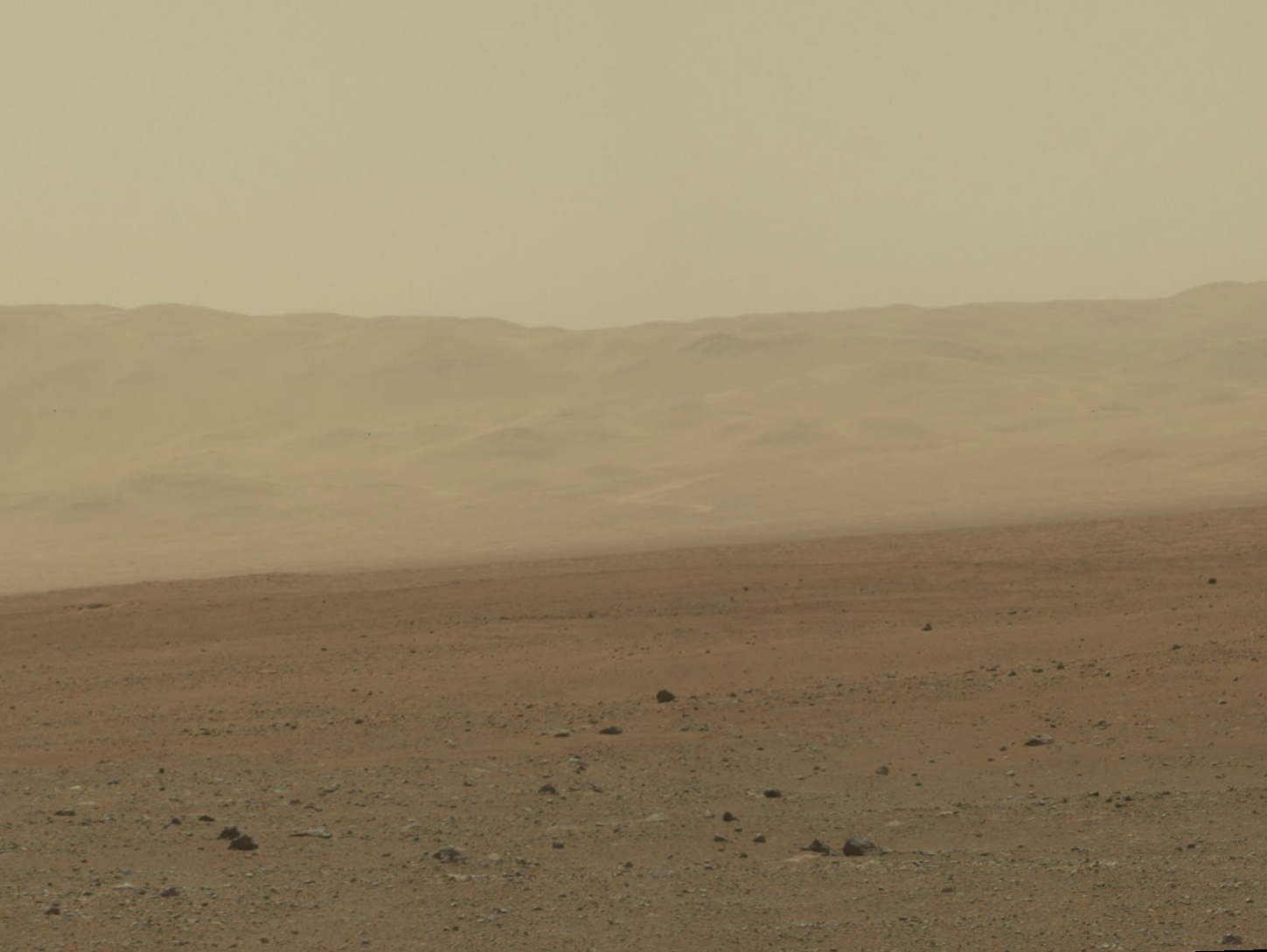
Gale rim about 18 km (11 mi) north of Curiosity (August 9, 2012)

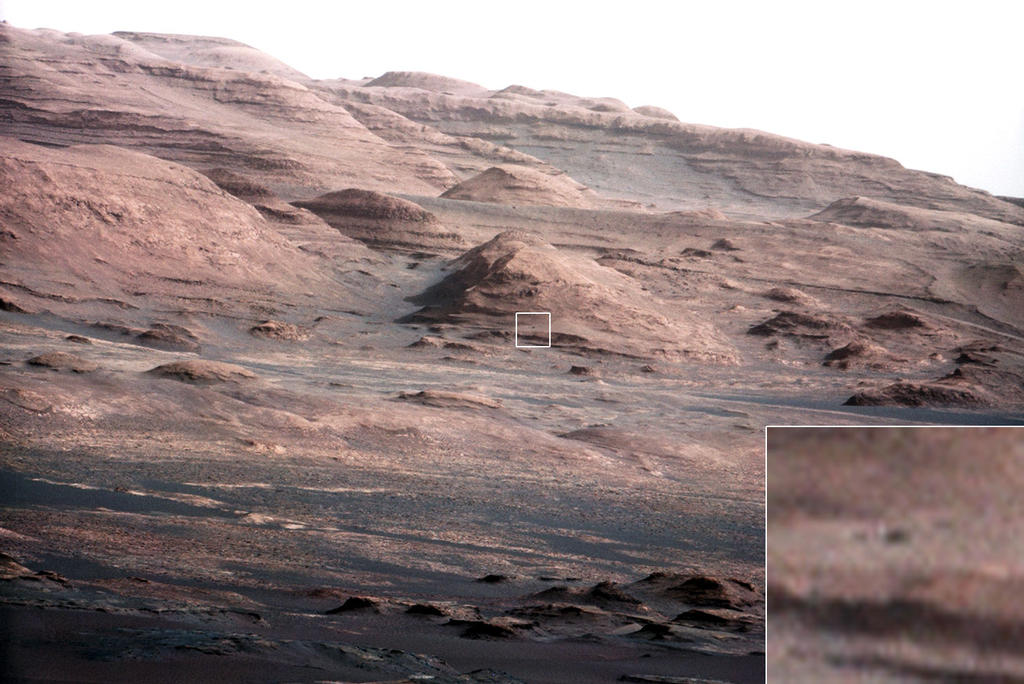
Layers at the base of Aeolis Mons - dark rock in inset is same size as Curiosity (white balanced image)

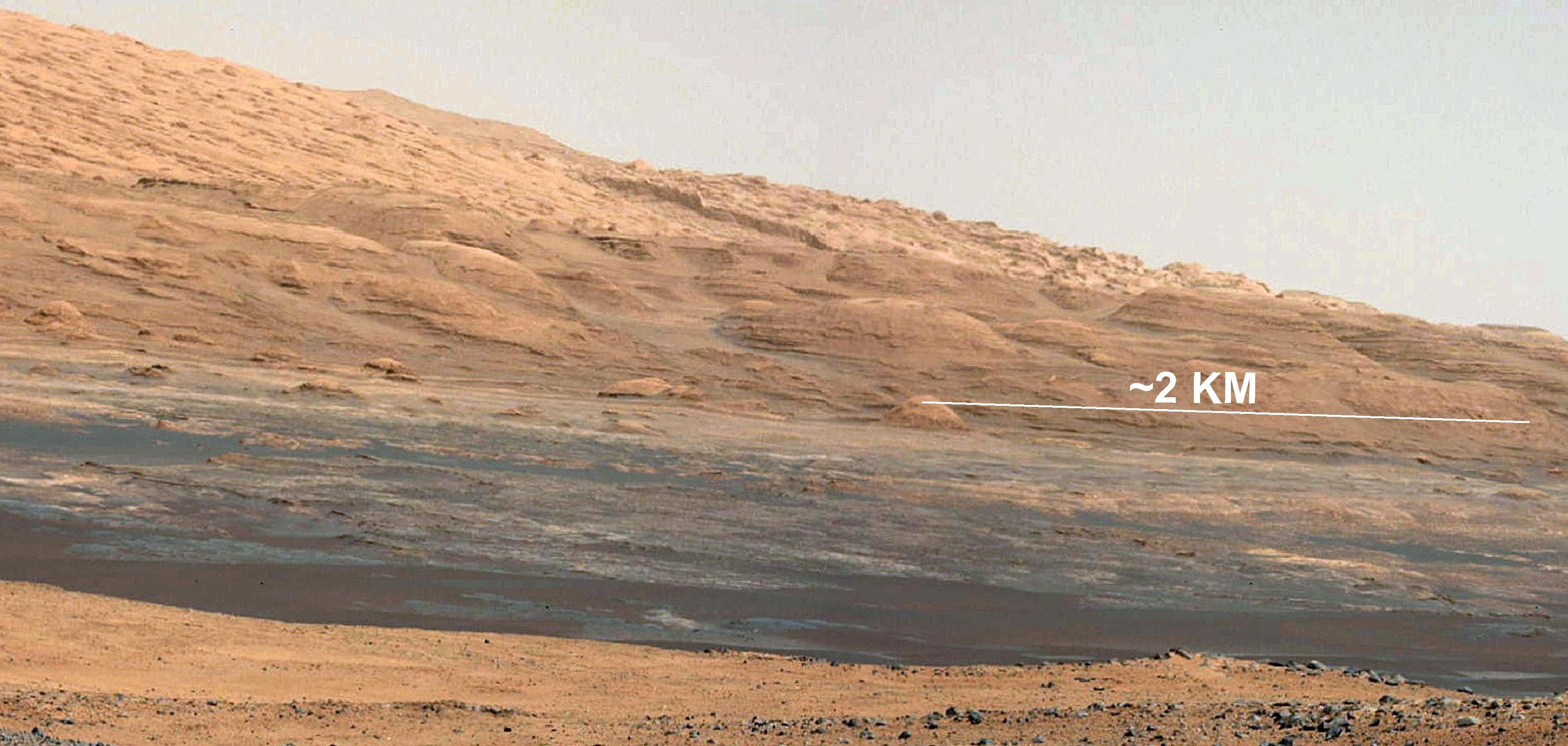
Aeolis Mons in Gale as viewed by Curiosity (August 9, 2012) (white balanced image)

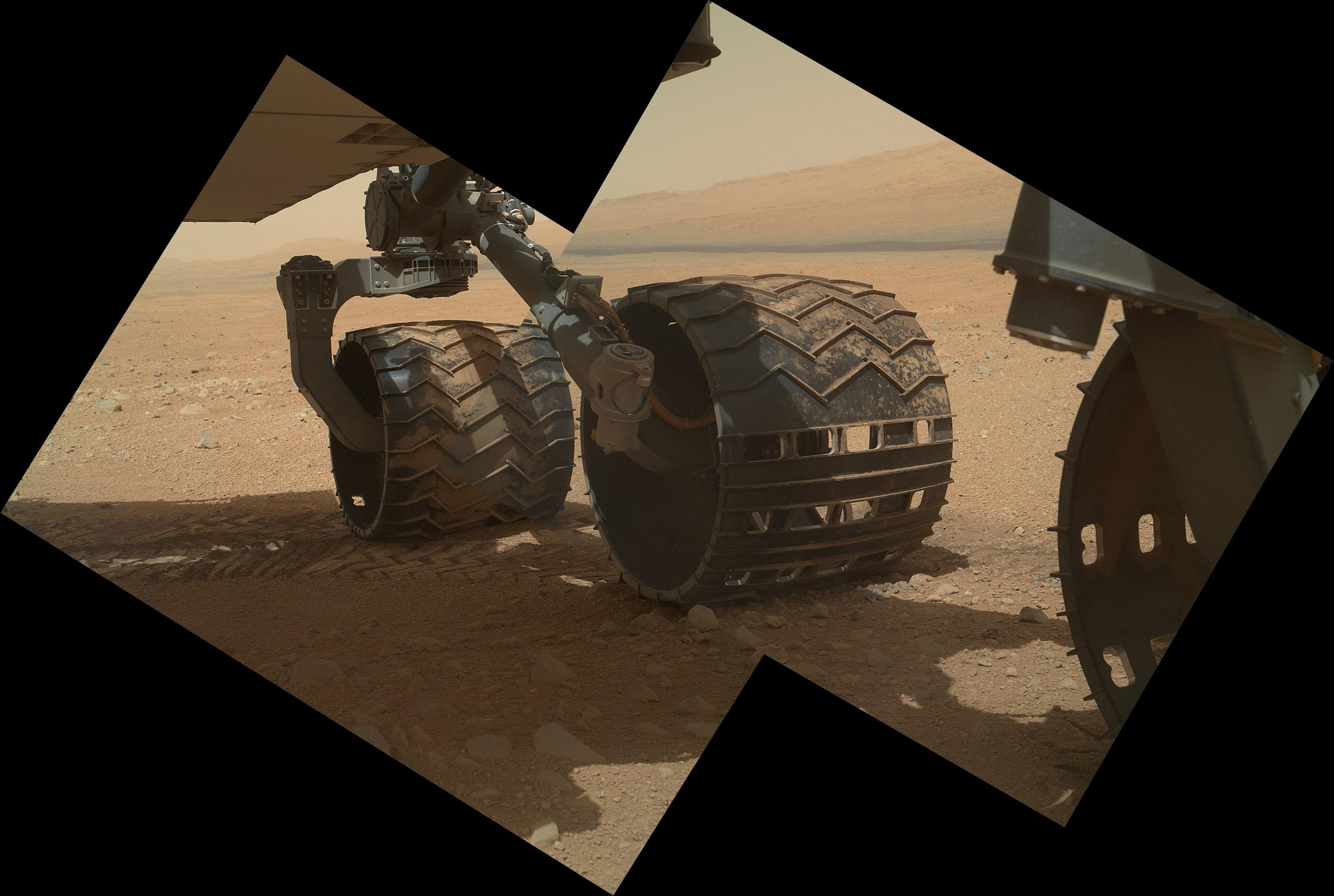
Wheels on Curiosity - Aeolis Mons is in the background (MAHLI, September 9, 2012).

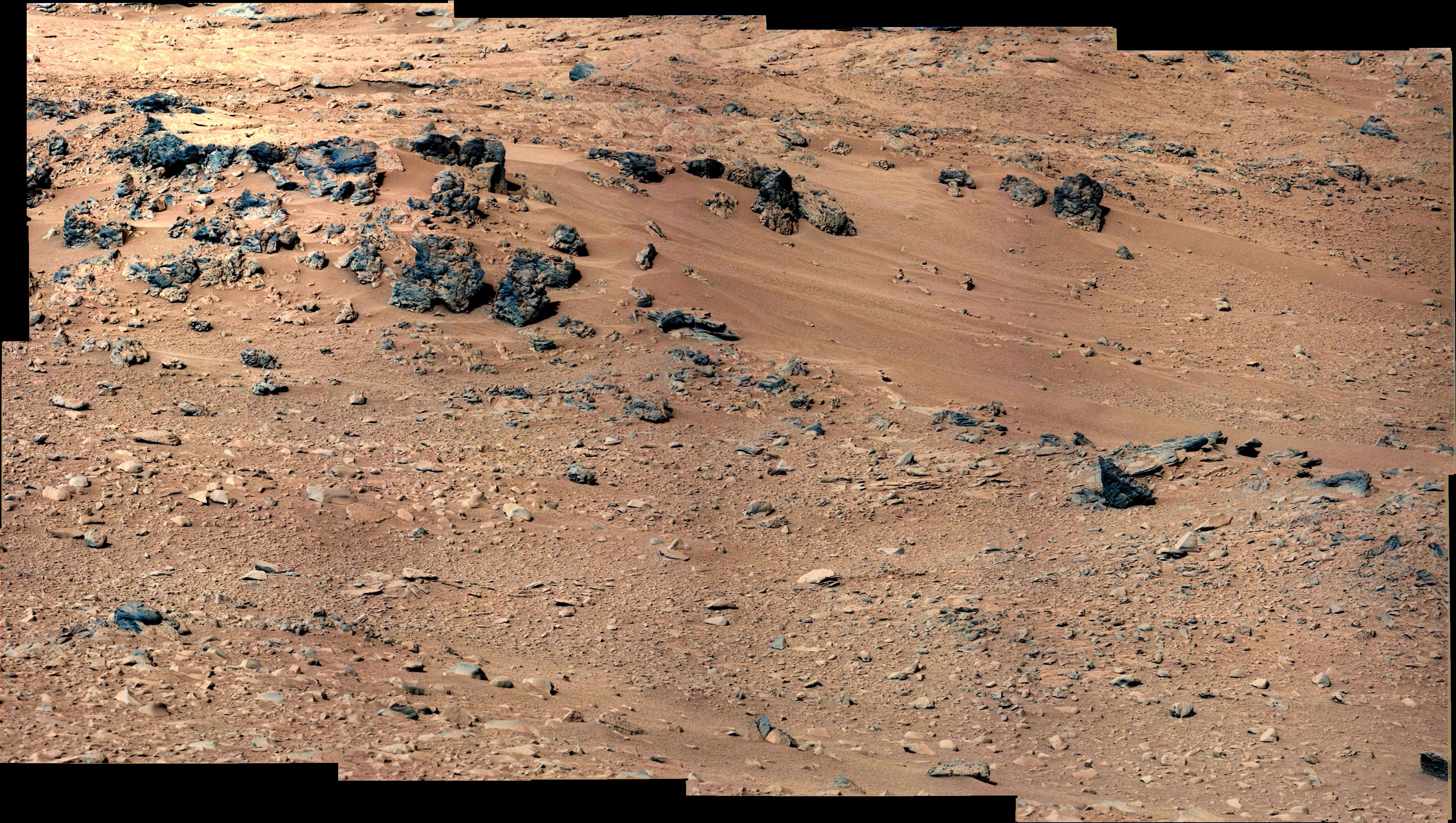
"Rocknest" sand patch in Gale - between "Bradbury Landing" and Glenelg (September 28, 2012)

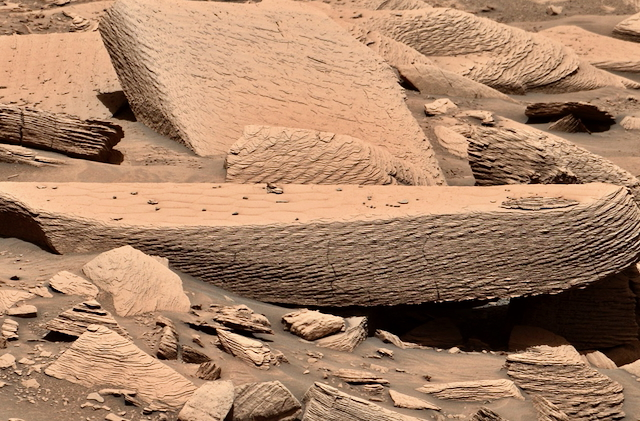
Ripple-marked sandstone offers evidence of an ancient sandstorm—and a thicker ancient Martian atmosphere
Evidence of water on Mars in the crater Gale

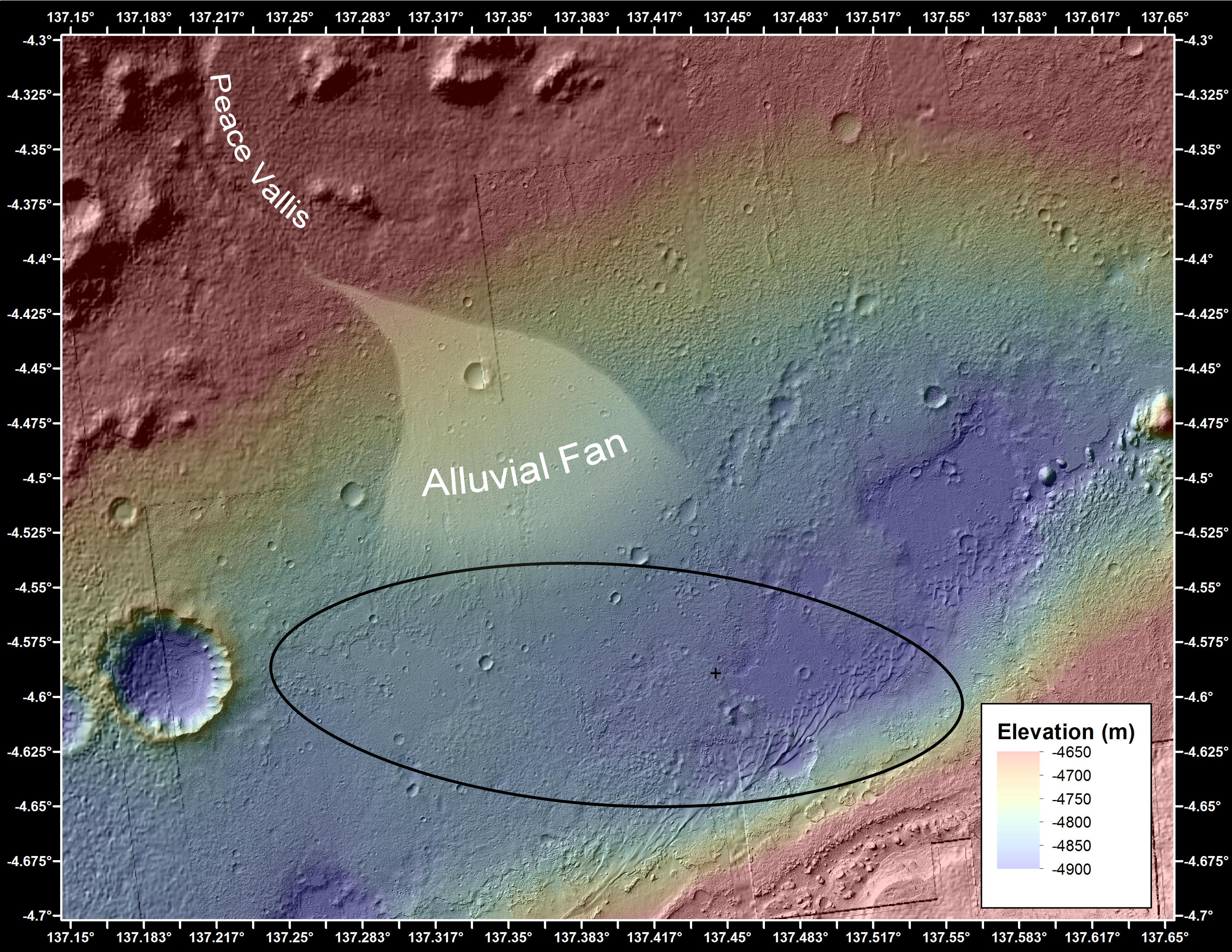
Peace Vallis and related alluvial fan near the Curiosity landing ellipse and landing site (noted by +)

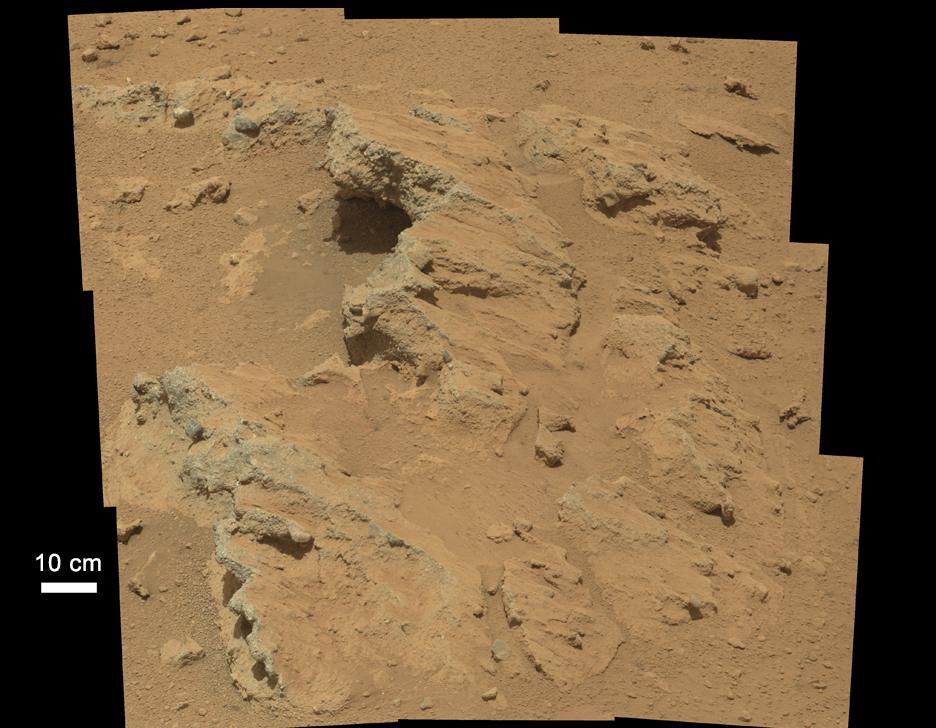
"Hottah" rock outcrop on Mars - an ancient streambed viewed by Curiosity (September 14, 2012) (close-up) (3-D version).

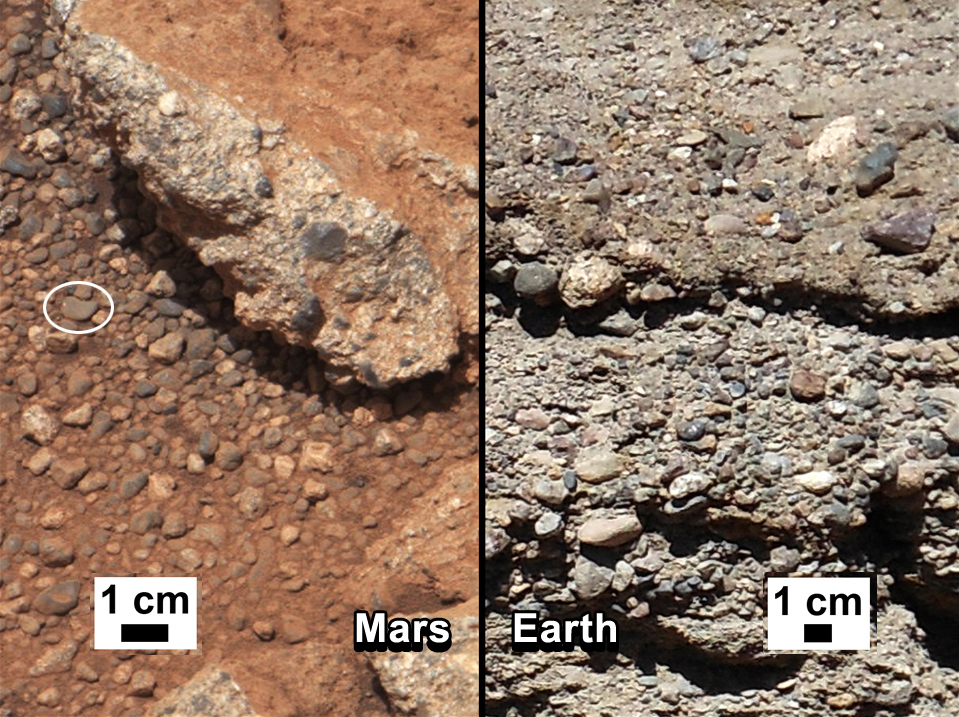
"Link" rock outcrop on Mars - compared with a terrestrial fluvial conglomerate - suggesting water "vigorously" flowing in a stream

Curiosity on the way to Glenelg (September 26, 2012)
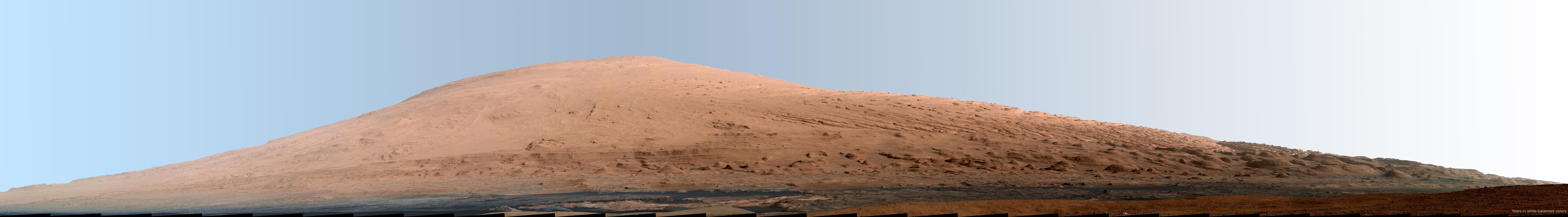
Curiosity's view of "Mount Sharp" (September 20, 2012; white balanced) (raw color)
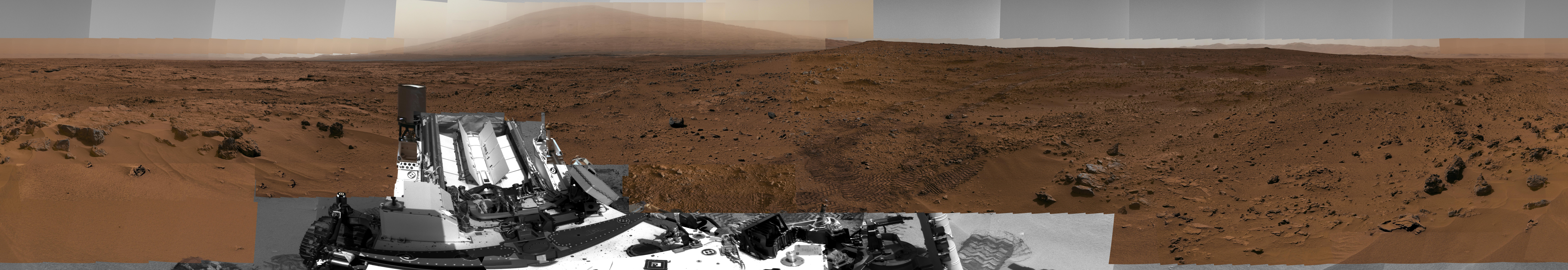
Curiosity's view of the "Rocknest" area - south is center/north at both ends; Mount Sharp at SE horizon (somewhat left-of-center); "Glenelg" at east (left-of-center); rover tracks at west (right-of-center) (November 16, 2012; white balanced) (raw color) (interactives)
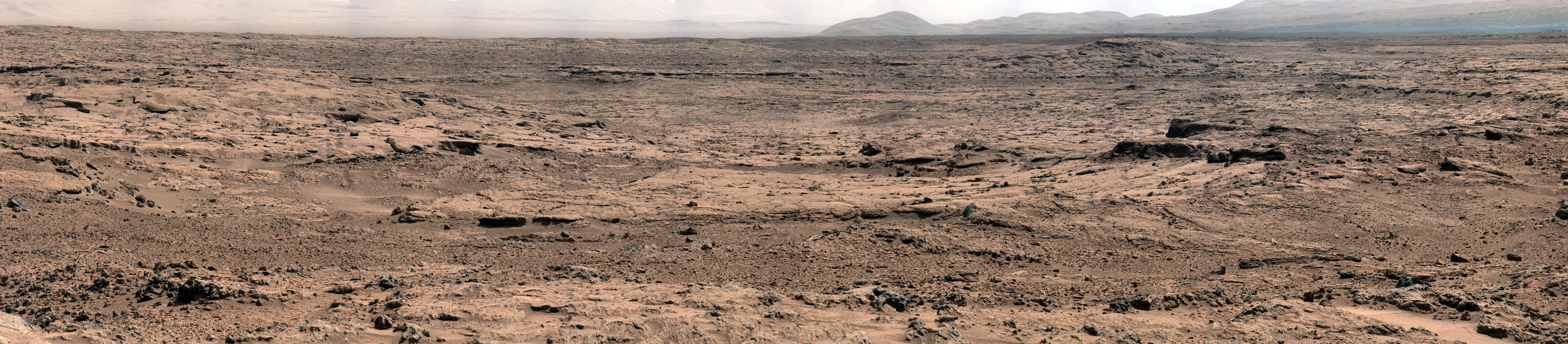
Curiosity's view of Gale's walls from Aeolis Palus at "Rocknest" looking eastward toward "Point Lake" (center) on the way to "Glenelg Intrigue" - Aeolis Mons is on the right (November 26, 2012; white balanced) (raw color)
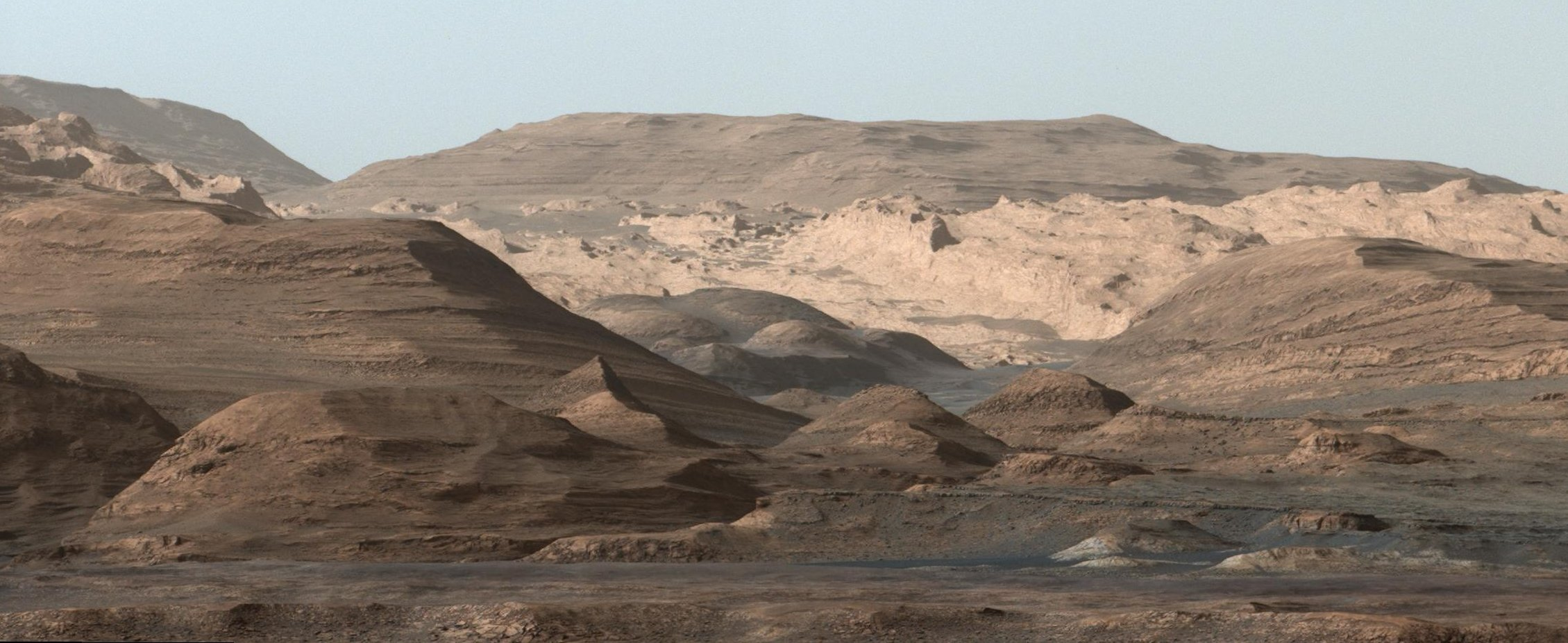
Curiosity's view of "Mount Sharp" (September 9, 2015)
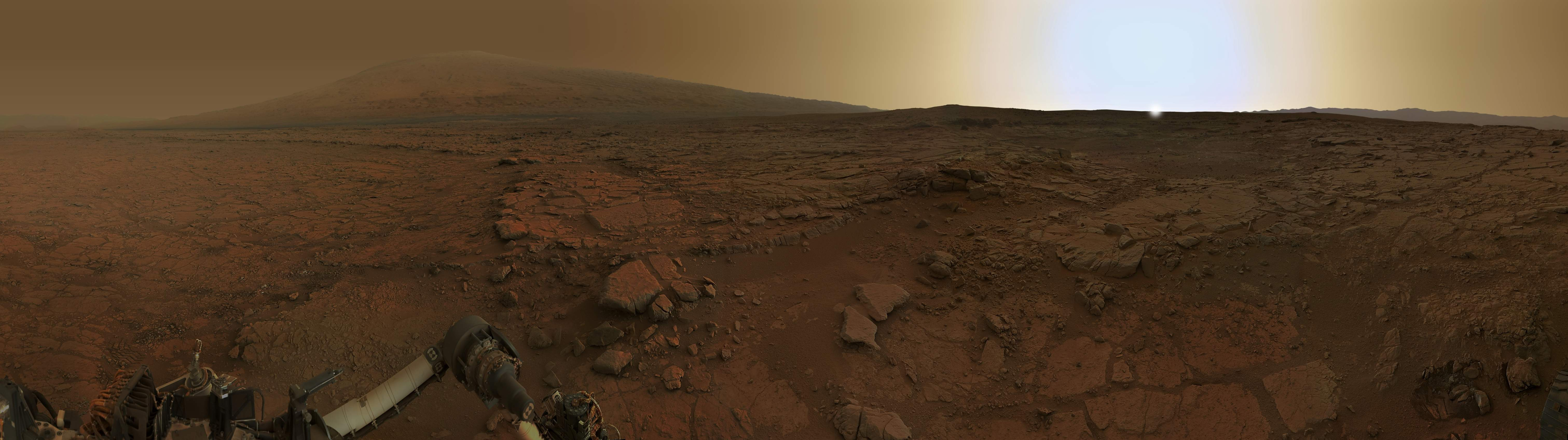
Curiosity's view of Mars sky at sunset (February 2013; Sun simulated by artist)

== See also ==
- Aeolis quadrangle
- Astrobiology
- Atmosphere of Mars
- Climate of Mars
- Composition of Mars
- Curiosity (rover)
- Equatorial Layered Deposits
- Geology of Mars
- Glenelg, Mars
- Groundwater on Mars
- HiRISE
- Impact crater
- Impact event
- Lakes on Mars
- Life on Mars
- List of craters on Mars
- List of mountains on Mars
- List of mountains on Mars by height
- List of rocks on Mars
- List of valles on Mars
- Mars Science Laboratory
- Methane on Mars
- Ore resources on Mars
- Peace Vallis
- Timeline of Mars Science Laboratory
- Water on Mars
