= Katie Stack Morgan =

American planetary scientist

Kathryn Marie Morgan Stack
- Born: Kathryn M. Stack
- Education: Williams College (BS} California Institute of Technology (MS, PhD)
- Scientific career
- Workplaces: Jet Propulsion Laboratory
- Thesis: Reconstructing Past Depositional and Diagenetic Processes through Quantitative Stratigraphic Analysis of the Martian Sedimentary Rock Record (2015)
- Doctoral advisor: John P. Grotzinger

Kathryn Morgan Stack is a scientist at the National Aeronautics and Space Administration where she is known for her work in the exploration of planets such as Mars.

== Early life and education ==
Stack grew up in California, but spent summers in Maine. She received her bachelor's degree from Williams College in 2008, and went on to earn an M.Sc. (2011) and a Ph.D. (2015) from the California Institute of Technology under the direction of John P. Grotzinger.

== Career ==
Stack has been involved in Mars exploration efforts since 2014. Her work as a Research Scientist in the Geophysics and Planetary Geosciences Group at the Jet Propulsion Laboratory, California Institute of Technology, has been centered on expanding our knowledge of Mars' geology and planetary sciences. She has also been actively involved with the Mars Science Laboratory mission concurrently, serving as a Participating Scientist until 2022 after serving as a Collaborator in the Science Office from 2012 to 2015. She has also been involved in the development and implementation of the Mars 2020 Rover Mission, an ambitious project that aims to solve the secrets of the Red Planet, as the Deputy Project Scientist since 2017. Her work on the Mars project includes working with images from the Curiosity rover and examining rocks to determine if they have potential biosignatures. As part of her work, Stack Morgan also names geographical places on Mars. Stack continues to contribute to Mars exploration research as of 2026. In March of 2026 Stack co-authored a study on the geological formation of domes on the floor of the Jezero crater on Mars. The study was published in the Journal of Geophysical Research: Planets.

== Honors and awards ==
Stack was named to the Forbes 30 Under 30 list in 2013. She has received multiple NASA Group Achievement Award that were given to the Mars Science Laboratory spanning from 2013, 2015, and 2017. Her contributions to the Mars 2020 Project have been recognized with a series of Voyager Awards spanning from 2018 to 2021. In 2022 she received a NASA Early Career Achievement Medal (2022). She received the Jet Propulsion Laboratory's Edward Stone Award for Outstanding Research Publication in 2021 for her 2018 paper in the journal Sedimentology.

== Selected publications ==
- Stack, K. M.; Grotzinger, J. P.; Milliken, R. E. (June 2013). "Bed thickness distributions on Mars: An orbital perspective". Journal of Geophysical Research: Planets. 118 (6): 1323–1349. Bibcode:2013JGRE..118.1323S. doi:10.1002/jgre.20092.
- Stack, K. M.; Grotzinger, J. P.; Kah, L. C.; Schmidt, M. E.; Mangold, N.; Edgett, K. S.; Sumner, D. Y.; Siebach, K. L.; Nachon, M.; Lee, R.; Blaney, D. L.; Deflores, L. P.; Edgar, L. A.; Fairén, A. G.; Leshin, L. A.; Maurice, S.; Oehler, D. Z.; Rice, M. S.; Wiens, R. C. (July 2014). "Diagenetic origin of nodules in the Sheepbed member, Yellowknife Bay formation, Gale crater, Mars: Diagenetic Nodules in Gale Crater". Journal of Geophysical Research: Planets. 119 (7): 1637–1664. doi:10.1002/2014JE004617.
- Stack, K.M.; Milliken, R.E. (April 2015). "Modeling near-infrared reflectance spectra of clay and sulfate mixtures and implications for Mars". Icarus. 250: 332–356. Bibcode:2015Icar..250..332S. doi:10.1016/j.icarus.2014.12.009.
- Sun, Vivian Z.; Stack, Kathryn M. (2020). "Geologic map of Jezero crater and the Nili Planum region, Mars". Scientific Investigations Map. doi:10.3133/sim3464.
