= John P. Grotzinger =

Portrait of John P. Grotzinger

John P. Grotzinger is the Fletcher Jones Professor of Geology at California Institute of Technology and chair of the Division of Geological and Planetary Sciences.

His works primarily focus on chemical and physical interactions between life and the environment.

In addition to biogeological studies done on Earth, Grotzinger is also active in research into the geology of Mars and has made contributions to NASA's Mars Exploration Program.

== Academic history ==
- B.S., Hobart College, 1979.
- M.S., University of Montana, 1981.
- Ph.D., Virginia Polytechnic Institute and State University, 1985
- Post-doc, Columbia University, 1985-1987.
- Professor, Massachusetts Institute of Technology, 1987-2005.
- Jones Professor, California Institute of Technology, 2005–present

=== Studies on Mars ===
John Grotzinger is involved in several planetary missions. He was Project Scientist for the Mars Science Laboratory (MSL) Curiosity rover mission, a Participating Scientist for the Mars Exploration Rover (MER) mission, and a Participating Scientist for the High Resolution Science Experiment (HiRISE) camera, on board the Mars Reconnaissance Orbiter (MRO).

Grotzinger has made significant contributions to understanding the early environmental history of Mars, as preserved within its record of sedimentary rocks. A long-standing goal of Mars environmental studies has been to understand the role of water throughout its geologic history. The presence of water is an indicator of potential habitability as well as of formerly different climatic conditions. Prior to in situ investigations by the Mars Exploration Rovers, most studies of water-related processes had been based on orbiter analysis of geomorphic and spectroscopic attributes. However, we can now directly examine the record of past surface processes, including the role of water, through sedimentologic studies of the stratigraphic record of Mars. Many processes that operate at a planetary surface have the potential to create a record of sedimentary rocks. Sedimentary rocks can provide clues that allow past environmental conditions to be reconstructed. Therefore, the detection of sediment transport by water and wind in ancient sedimentary layers is important, because it provides insight into past climatic regimes and potential habitability.

The Mars Science Laboratory Curiosity rover was launched on Saturday, November 26, 2011 on board an Atlas V-541 rocket from Cape Canaveral, Florida. The rover landed in Gale Crater on August 5, 2012. Curiosity's mission is to determine the planet's habitability and has been doing this using a suite of sophisticated instruments including cameras, spectrometers, environmental sensors, sample collection tools, and laboratory-quality geochemical instruments.

Curiosity landed at the foot of Mt. Sharp – Gale Crater's central mound – near the end of an ancient alluvial fan that formed by sediments transported by streams from the crater rim. In the first year of its mission, Curiosity discovered fine-grained sedimentary rocks of basaltic composition that represent an ancient lake and preserve evidence of an environment that would have been suited to support a Martian biosphere founded on chemolithoautotrophy. This aqueous environment was characterized by neutral pH, low salinity, and variable redox states of both iron and sulfur species. C, H, N, O, S, and P were measured directly as key biogenic elements. The environment likely had a minimum duration of hundreds to tens of thousands of years, and could have existed for millions of years. These results highlight the biological viability of fluvial-lacustrine environments in the post-Noachian history of Mars.

=== Co-evolution of Earth's early environment and biosphere ===
Grotzinger has made major contributions to the fields of Geobiology and Paleontology. Beginning in 1993, Grotzinger and his colleagues began a research program aimed at understanding the chronology of major biological and environmental events leading up to, and perhaps driving early Cambrian radiation of metazoans. The so-called Cambrian explosion of biodiversity was shown to have been much more rapid than previously understood. It also may have followed an extinction event of earlier organisms that pioneered and experimented with calcification. More recent research over the past decade has been based on understanding carbon and sulfur isotope ratios in carbonate sediments of Ediacaran age. This work proposed that vertical circulation of ocean water led to oxygenation of the deep ocean shortly before the end of the Proterozoic time, which may also have contributed to the rise in biodiversity in early Cambrian time.

The Shuram carbon isotopic excursion - the largest known in Earth history - has been the subject of intensive research at Caltech. Measurement of the carbon isotope ratios in ancient carbonate rocks provides the principal basis by which the fluxes of reduced and oxidized carbon are determined over the course of Earth's history. Globally distributed carbonate rocks of middle Ediacaran age (ca. 600-560 million years ago) record the largest carbon isotope excursion in Earth history, suggesting dramatic reorganization of Earth's carbon cycle. The Shuram Excursion closely precedes impressive evolutionary events including the rise of large metazoans and the origin of biomineralization in animals.

Combining his expertise in sedimentology and geobiology, Grotzinger's research on stromatolites shows that they are vital tools in understanding the interactions between ancient microorganisms and their environment. Stromatolites are attached, lithified sedimentary growth structures, accretionary away from a point or limited surface of initiation. Though the accretion process is commonly regarded to result from the sediment trapping or precipitation-inducing activities of microbial mats, only rarely is evidence of this process preserved in Precambrian stromatolites. Grotzinger's research has applied a process-based approach, oriented toward deconvolving the replacement textures of ancient stromatolites. The effects of diagenetic recrystallization first must be accounted for, followed by analysis of lamination textures and deduction of possible accretion mechanisms. Accretion hypotheses can be tested using numerical simulations based on modern stromatolite growth processes. Application of this approach has shown that stromatolites were originally formed largely through in situ precipitation of laminae during Archean and older Proterozoic times, but that younger Proterozoic stromatolites grew largely through the accretion of carbonate sediments, most likely through the physical process of microbial trapping and binding. This trend most likely reflects long-term evolution of the earth's environment rather than microbial communities.

In 2007, Grotzinger received the Charles Doolittle Walcott Medal from the National Academy of Sciences

== Books ==
Grotzinger, J. P. and James, N. P., 2000, Carbonate Sedimentation and Diagenesis in the Evolving Precambrian World, Special Publication 67: SEPM (Society for Sedimentary Geology), Tulsa, OK.

Press, F., Siever, R., Grotzinger, J. P., Jordan, T. H., 2003, Understanding Earth, 4th Edition. Freeman, 567 pp.

Grotzinger, J. P., Jordan, T. H., Press, F., and Siever, R., 2006, Understanding Earth, 5th Edition, Freeman, 579 pp.

Jordan, T.H., and Grotzinger, J.P., 2008, Essential Earth, 1st Edition, Freeman, 384 pp.

Grotzinger, J. P., and Jordan, 2010, Understanding Earth, 6th Edition, Freeman, 582 pp.

Jordan, T.H., and Grotzinger, J.P., 2011, Essential Earth, 2nd Edition, Freeman, 391 pp.

Grotzinger, J. P., and Milliken, R. E. (eds). 2012, Sedimentary Geology of Mars, Special Publication 102: SEPM (Society for Sedimentary Geology), Tulsa, OK.

Grotzinger, J. P., Vasavada, A., and Russell, C (eds), 2013, Mars Science Laboratory Mission. Springer, London, 763 pp.

== Selected Papers ==
=== Mars ===
- Grotzinger, J.P.; Sumner, D. Y.; et al. (2014). "A habitable fluvio-lacustrine environment at Gale Crater, Mars". Science. 343 (6169). doi:10.1126/science.1242777.
- Grotzinger, J. P. (2014). "Habitability, Taphonomy, and the Search for Organic Carbon on Mars". Science. 343 (6169): 386–387. doi:10.1126/science.1249944.
- Farley, K.A.; Malespin, C.; Mahaffy, P.; Grotzinger, J. P.; et al. (2014). "In-situ Radiometric and Exposure age dating of the Martian surface". Science. 343 (6169). doi:10.1126/science.1247166.
- Grotzinger, J. P. (2013). "Analysis of surface materials by the Curiosity rover". Science. 341 (6153): 1475. doi:10.1126/science.1244258.
- Grotzinger J. P., Hayes A. G., Lamb M. P., and McLennan S. M. (2013) Sedimentary processes on Earth, Mars, Titan, and Venus. In Comparative Climatology of Terrestrial Planets (S. J. Mackwell et al., eds.), p. 439-472 Univ. of Arizona, Tucson
- Williams, R.M.E., Grotzinger, J.P., and 35 others (2013), Martian fluvial conglomerates at Gale Grater., 2013, Science 340, 1068-1072.
- Grotzinger, J.P., and 25 others, 2013 Mars Science Laboratory Mission and science investigation. In, Grotzinger, J. P., Vasavada, A., and Russell, C (eds) Mars Science Laboratory Mission. Springer, London, pp. 3–54. DOI 10.1007/s11214-012-9892-2
- Grotzinger, J.P., and Vasavada, A., 2012, Reading the red planet. Scientific American, July, 2012, p. 40-43.
- Grotzinger JP, Milliken RE. 2012. The Sedimentary Rock Record of Mars: Distribution, Origins, and Global Stratigraphy. In Grotzinger JP, Milliken RE (Editors). Sedimentary Geology of Mars, Special Publication 102: SEPM (Society for Sedimentary Geology), Tulsa, OK. p. 1–48.
- Grotzinger, J. P. et al., 2011, Mars Sedimentary Geology: Key Concepts and Outstanding Questions. Astrobiology, v 11, p. 77-87.
- Milliken, R., Grotzinger, J., and Thomson, B., 2010, The paleoclimate of Mars from the stratigraphic record in Gale Crater. Geophysical Research Letters, v. 37, L04201, doi:10.1029/2009GL041870
- Metz, J.M., Grotzinger, J.P., Rubin, D.M., Lewis, K.W., Squyres, S.W., and Bell III, J.F., 2009. Sulfate-rich eolian and wet interdune deposits, Erebus crater, Meridiani Planum, Mars. Journal of Sedimentary Research, 79, p. 247-264.
- Grotzinger, J. P., 2009, Mars Exploration, Comparative Planetary History, and the Promise of Mars Science Laboratory. Nature Geoscience, v. 2, p. 1-3.
- McLennan, S. M., Bell III, J. F., Calvin, W., Grotzinger, J. P., and 28 others, 2005, Provenance and diagenesis of the evaporite-bearing Burns formation, Meridiani Planum, Mars. Earth and Planetary Science Letters, v 240, 95-121.
- Grotzinger, J.P.; Arvidson, R.E.; Bell III, J.F.; et al. (2005). "Stratigraphy and Sedimentology of a Dry to Wet Eolian Depositional System, Burns Formation, Meridiani Planum, Mars:". Earth and Planetary Science Letters. 240 (1): 11–72. doi:10.1016/j.epsl.2005.09.039.
- Squyres, S.; Grotzinger, J.P.; Arvidson, R.E.; Bell, J. F. III; et al. (2004). "In-situ evidence for an aqueous environment at Meridiani Planum, Mars". Science. 306 (5702): 1709–1714. doi:10.1126/science.1104559.

=== Earth ===
- Bergmann, K.D.; Grotzinger, J.P.; Fischer, W. W. (2013). "Biological influences on seafloor carbonate precipitation". PALAIOS. 28 (2): 99–115. doi:10.2110/palo.2012.p12-088r.
- Lee, C.; Fike, D.A.; Love, G.D.; Sessions, A.L.; Grotzinger, J.P.; Summons, R.E.; Fischer, W.W. (2013). "Carbon isotopes and lipid biomarkers from organic-rich facies of the Shuram Formation, Sultanate of Oman". Geobiology. 11 (5): 406–419. doi:10.1111/gbi.12045.
- Bontognali, T.R.R; Sessions, A.L.; Allwood, A.C.; Fischer, W.W.; Grotzinger, J.P.; Summons, R.E.; Eiler, J.M. (2012). "Sulfur isotopes of organic matter preserved in 3.45 Gyr-old stromatolites reveal microbial metabolism". Proceedings of the National Academy of Sciences. 109 (38): 15146–15151. doi:10.1073/pnas.1207491109. hdl:1721.1/76730. PMC 3458326.
- Wilson, J.P., Grotzinger, J.P., et al., 2012, Deep-water incised valley deposits at the Ediacaran-Cambrian boundary in southern Namibia contain abundant Treptichnus Pedum. Palaios, v. 27, p. 252-273.
- Maloof, A. C., and Grotzinger, J. P., 2011, The Holocene shallowing-upward parasequence of north-west Andros Island, Bahamas. Sedimentology, doi: 10.1111/j.1365-3091.2011.01313.x
- Butterfield, N. J., and Grotzinger, J. P., 2012, Palynology of the Huqf Supergroup, Oman. Geological Society of London Special Publication, v. 366, DOI: 10.1144/SP366.10.
- Bristow, T., Bonifacie, M., Derkowski, A., Eiler, J., and Grotzinger, J. P., 2011, A hydrothermal origin for isotopically anomalous cap dolostone cements from South China. Nature, 474, 68-72.
- Love, G., Grosjean, E., Stalvies, C., Fike, D., Grotzinger, J., and 8 others, 2009, Fossil steroids record the appearance of Demospongiae during the Cryogenian period. Nature, v. 457, p. 718-721.
- Grotzinger, J. P., and Miller, R., 2008, The Nama Group. In, R. Miller (ed.), The Geology of Namibia. Geological Society of Namibia Special Publication, Volume 2, p. 13-229 – 13-272.
- Schröder, S. and Grotzinger, J. P., 2007, Evidence for anoxia at the Ediacaran-Cambrian boundary: The record of redox-sensitive trace elements and rare-earth elements in Oman. Journal of the Geological Society of London, v. 164, p. 175-187.
- Fike, D.A.; Grotzinger, J.P.; Pratt, L.M.; Summons, R.E. (2006). "Oxidation of the Ediacaran Ocean". Nature. 444: 744–747. doi:10.1038/nature05345.
- Grotzinger, J. P., Adams, E., and Schröder, S., 2005, Microbial-metazoan reefs of the terminal Proterozoic Nama Group (ca. 550-543 Ma), Namibia. Geological Magazine, v. 142, p. 499-517.
- Grotzinger, J. P and Knoll, A. H. 1999. Stromatolites: Evolutionary mileposts or environmental dipsticks? Annual Review of Earth and Planetary Sciences, v. 27, p. 313-358.
- Grotzinger, J. P., Watters, W. and Knoll, A. H., 2000, Calcified metazoans in thrombolite-stromatolite reefs of the terminal Proterozoic Nama Group, Namibia. Paleobiology, v. 26, p. 334-359.
- Sumner, D. Y. and Grotzinger, J. P., 1996. Were kinetics of Archean calcium carbonate precipitation related to oxygen concentration? Geology, v. 24, p. 119-122.
- Grotzinger, J. P. and Rothman, D. H., 1996. An abiotic model for stromatolite morphogenesis. Nature, v. 383, p. 423-425.
- Grotzinger, J. P. Trends in Precambrian carbonate sediments and their implication for understanding evolution. in, Bengtson, S. (ed.), Early Life on Earth, Columbia University Press, p. 245-258 .
- Grotzinger, J.P.; Royden, L.H. (1990). "Elastic strength of the Slave craton at 1.9 Gyr and implications for the thermal evolution of the continents". Nature. 347: 64–66. doi:10.1038/347064a0.
- Grotzinger, John P. 1989. Facies and evolution of Precambrian carbonate depositional systems: emergence of the modern platform archetype, in, SEPM Special Publication 44, p. 79-106.
- Christie-Blick, N., Grotzinger, J.P., and von der Borch, C.C. 1988. Sequence stratigraphy in Proterozoic Successions. Geology, v. 16, p. 100-104.
- Grotzinger, J.P. 1986. Upward shallowing platform cycles: A response to 2.2 billion years of low-amplitude, high-frequency (Milankovitch band) sea level oscillations. Paleoceanography, v. 1, no. 4, p. 403-416.
- Grotzinger, J.P.; Read, J.F. (1983). "Evidence for primary aragonite precipitation, early Proterozoic (1.9 Ga) Rocknest Dolomite, Wopmay Orogen, northwest Canada". Geology. 11 (12): 710–713. doi:10.1130/0091-7613(1983)11<710:EFPAPL>2.0.CO;2.

== Honors ==
• NASA Outstanding Public Leadership Medal (2013; notable leadership of a NASA space mission)

• Roy Chapman Andrews Explorer Award (2013; outstanding achievement in scientific discovery through exploration)

• Halbouty Award, American Association of Petroleum Geologists (2012; exceptional leadership in the petroleum geosciences)

• Lawrence Sloss Award, Geological Society of America (2011; lifetime achievement in sedimentary geology)

• Charles Doolittle Walcott Medal, National Academy of Sciences (2007; "for the insightful elucidation of ancient carbonates and the stromatolites they contain, and for meticulous field research that has established the timing of early animal evolution".)

• Henno Martin Medal, Geological Society of Namibia (2002; significant contributions to understanding the geology of Namibia)

• Donath Medal, Geological Society of America (1992; outstanding achievement in contributing to geologic knowledge – under 35 years old.)

• Presidential Young Investigator Award of the National Science Foundation (1990)
