= Dawn Sumner =

American geologist, planetary scientist, and astrobiologist

Dawn Y. Sumner
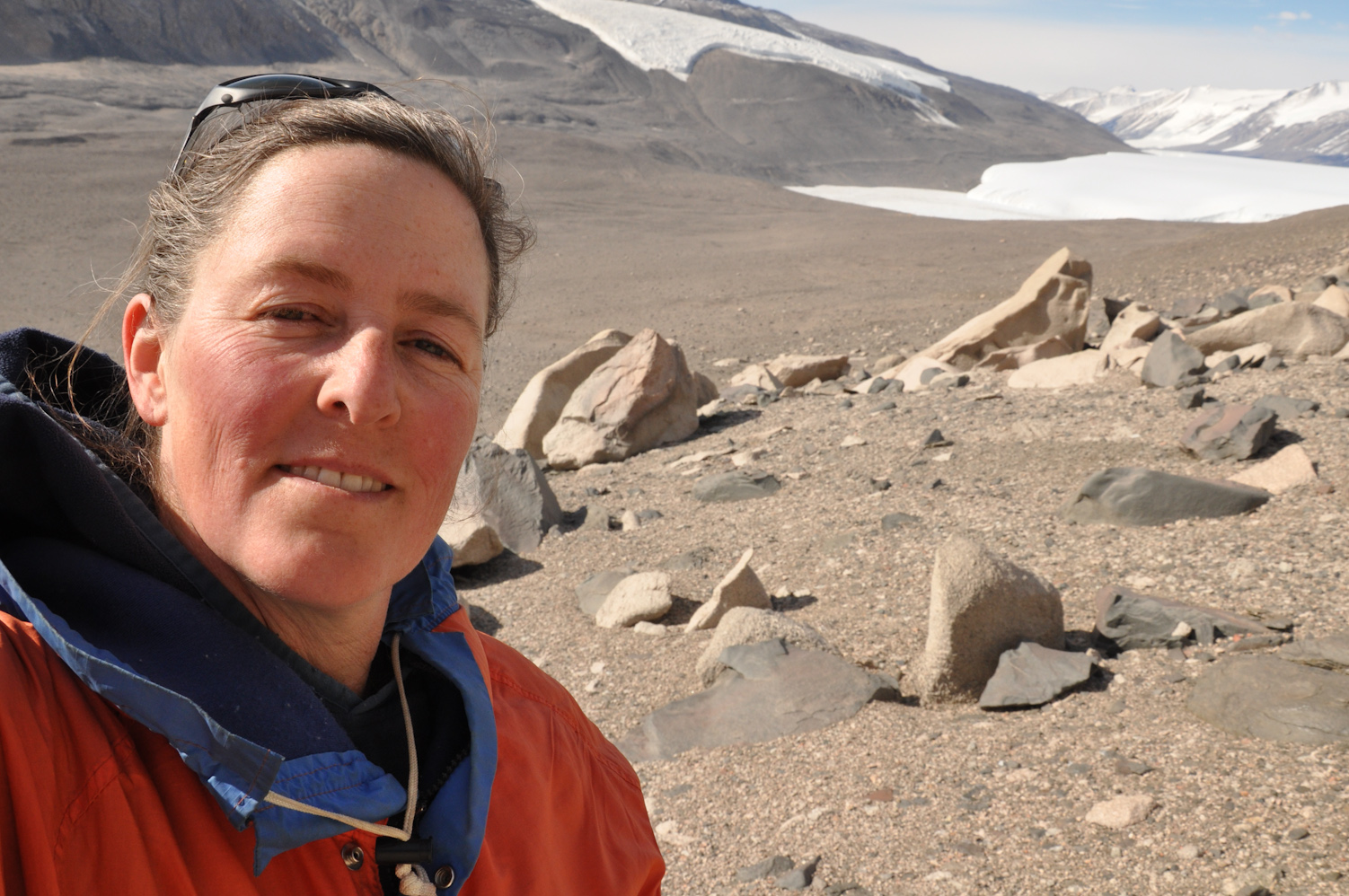
- Dawn Sumner in Pearse Valley, Dry Valleys, Antarctica
- Born: Seattle, Washington (state), USA
- Education: Caltech; MIT
- Known for: Microbial life in extreme environments ancient microbial life
- Awards: Fellow of the Geological Society of America; Career Award for Outstanding Contributions in Geosciences, Geobiology and Microbiology from the Geological Society of America
- Scientific career
- Workplaces: University of California, Davis
- Website: https://dysumner.faculty.ucdavis.edu/

Dawn Yvonne Sumner is an American geologist, planetary scientist, and astrobiologist. She is a professor at the University of California, Davis. Sumner's research includes evaluating microbial communities in Antarctic lakes, exploration of Mars via the Curiosity rover, and characterization of microbial communities in the lab and from ancient geologic samples. She is an investigator on the NASA Mars Science Laboratory (MSL) and was Chair of the UC Davis Department of Earth & Planetary Sciences from 2014 to 2016. She is Fellow of the Geological Society of America.

== Early life and education ==
Sumner was born near Seattle, Washington, and spent part of her childhood on the Yakama Indian Reservation in the Pacific Northwest. From there, she earned a B.S. with Honors in geology from the California Institute of Technology (Caltech), then attended the Massachusetts Institute of Technology for her Ph.D. which she completed in 1995. Sumner then returned Caltech for postdoctoral research, supported by an O.K. Earl Postdoctoral Fellowship.

== Career ==
- Ancient Microbial Communities is part of Sumner's research which includes understanding microbial evolution and ecology and Earth history through microbial signatures in the rock record. Her publications feature new developments in how to interpret ancient biological responses to environmental factors, tracing oxygenation and the impact on carbonate microbial biological signatures. Sumner has also studied carbon isotopes of specific carbonates in order to find evidence of life.
- Antarctic Lakes Sumner's research utilizes Antarctic lakes as a model system for understanding microbial processes, early oxygenic photosynthesis, and life on other planets. This work includes the discovery of pinnacles of microbial growth under ice-covered lakes and describes multiple microbial communities involved in the development of these features. Similar features in another Antarctic lake appear to record changes in the lake environment, including sea level, through time.
- Exploration of Mars and its Environments Professor Sumner's research with the Mars Science Laboratory has generated over three dozen collaborative publications and helped uncover evidence of ancient lakes on Mars. Sumner's research has established that parts of ancient Mars could have hosted life as we know it on Earth, and contributed to the discovery of organic molecules on Mars. As a geologist, Sumner applies many of the same principles that would be used on earth, such as stratigraphy and geochemistry, to the Martian environment. Sumner is a MSL "long term planner", one of several lead geoscientists amongst more than five hundred scientists not directly employed by NASA on this project. Sumner was involved in the creation of a geological map of Gale crater, and selecting the landing site of Curiosity. Sumner was partially responsible for the assignment of daily operations to fit the long-term missions goals. and also involved in future planning for additional Mars exploration, including a mission in 2020.
- Neoarchean Geological Time Period is a part of Professor Sumner's research that has been accumulated in South Africa. Sumner has studied the precipitation of multiple elements including carbonate and aragonite. This research has led Sumner to develop new understandings of the oceans pH in Neoarchean time period which can lead to discoveries in the changes of the oceans pH through time. Sumner's conducted this research using methods of stratigraphy and petrography.

== Awards and honors ==
Sumner was elected a Fellow of the Geological Society of America in 2014. Also in 2014, she was selected to deliver the honorary Carl Sagan Lecture at the American Geophysical Union. In 2016, Sumner was awarded the Career Award for Outstanding Contributions in Geosciences, Geobiology and Microbiology from the Geological Society of America. Sumner also received the distinguished career award from the University of California, Davis 2016: for extensive research in microbiology, geochemistry, and research in the exploration of mars over her career. More recently, Sumner's was one of 14 selected to become a fellow of the California Academy of Sciences for her contributions to the study of microbial sciences.

== Equality and sexual harassment in science ==
Sumner is the author of a widely used anti-harassment statement that she made public so that other universities and institutes could use it as a model. A leader in helping institutions develop anti-harassment plans, Sumner presented to a workshop at the 2016 American Geophysical Union on "Addressing harassment and improving workplace climate." She was also an invited presenter for Association of Polar Early Career Scientists webinar on sexual harassment during fieldwork. Sumner is presently chair of advisory board for The Feminist Research Institute at the UC, Davis In June 2020 she became the leader of the Anti-Racism Action Committee in her department (Earth and Planetary Science) at UC Davis. Sumner also wrote four letters concerning racism and its effects on the science community between late May and early June 2020

== Selected publications ==
Title of Article	Author(s)/ Publication year	Topic(s)	Source
Were kinetics of Archean calcium carbonate precipitation related to oxygen concentration?	Dawn Y. Sumner & John P. Grotzinger, 1996	Geology	Geology, v. 24, p. 119-122. DOI: 10.1130/0091-7613
Late Archean calcite-microbe interactions: Two morphologically distinct microbial communities that affected calcite nucleation differently	Dawn Y. Sumner, 1997	Microbiology	Palaios, v. 12, p. 300-316. DOI: 10.2307/3515333
Late Archean Aragonite Precipitation: Petrography, Facies Associations, and Environmental Significance	Dawn Y. Sumner & John P. Grotzinger, 2000	Geology	Late Archean aragonite precipitation: Petrography, facies associations, and environmental significance
Renalcids as fossilized biofilm clusters	Dawn Y. Sumner & Nat P. Stephens, 2002	Microbiology, Geology, Paleontology	Palaios, v. 17, p. 225-236. DOI: 10.1669/0883-1351(2002)017<0225:RAFBC>2.0.CO;2
Poor preservational potential of organics in Meridiani Planum hematite-bearing sedimentary rocks	Dawn Y. Sumner, 2004	Geology, Mars	Journal of Geophysical Research, Planets, v. 109, E12007. DOI: 10.1029/2004JE002321
Cracks and fins in sulfate sand: Evidence for recent mineral-atmospheric water cycling in Meridiani Planum outcrops?	Gregory V. Chavdarian & Dawn Y. Sumner, 2006	Geology, Mars	Geology, v. 34, p. 229-232. DOI: 10.1130/G22101.1
Isotopic fingerprints of microbial respiration in aragonite from Bahamian stromatolites	Miriam S. Andres, R. Pamela Reid, Dawn Y. Sumner, & Peter Swart.	Microbiology	Geology, v. 34, p. 973-976. DOI: 10.1130/G22859A.1
Undirected motility of filamentous cyanobacteria produces reticulate mats	R. N. Shepard & Dawn Y. Sumner	Microbiology, Geology	Geobiology, v. 8, p. 179-190. DOI: 10.1111/j.1472-4669.2010.00235.x
Discovery of large conical stromatolites in Lake Untersee, Antarctica	Andersen, Dale T., Sumner, Dawn Y., et al., 2011	Microbiology	Geobiology, v.9. 280–293. DOI: 10.1111/j.1472-4669.2011.00279.x.
Origins of Microbial Microstructures In the Neoproterozoic Beck Spring Dolomite: Variations In Microbial Community and Timing of Lithification	Harwood, Cara L., and Sumner, Dawn Y., 2012	Geology, Microbiology	Journal of Sedimentary Research, v. 82, p. 709-722, DOI: 10.2110/jsr.2012.65
Antarctic microbial mats: A modern analog for Archean lacustrine oxygen oases	Sumner, Dawn Y., Hawes, Ian, et al., 2015	Geochemistry, Geology	Geology, v. 43, p. 887-890. DOI: 10.1130/G36966.1
Growth of elaborate microbial pinnacles in Lake Vanda, Antarctica	Sumner, Dawn Y., Anne D. Jungblut, et al., 2016	Microbiology	Geobiology, v. 14, 556-574. DOI: 10.1111/gbi.12188
A habitable fluvio-lacustrine environment at Yellowknife Bay, Gale Crater, Mars	Grotzinger, J.P., D.Y. Sumner, et al., 2014 (online 2013)	Environmental Science	Science, v. 343, 1242777. DOI: 10.1126/science.1242777
Biology and Geology: A Necessary Symbiosis	Dawn Y. Sumner, 2002	Biology, Geology	Palaios, v. 17(4), p. 307–308. DOI: 10.1669/0883-1351(2002)017<0307:BAGANS>2.0.CO;2

== Outreach ==
Sumner has presented lectures to public and school groups, and she has participated in videos and films on exploring Mars. These have included presentations at Sierra College, a Northern California Rotary Club, and Sacramento State University's Science in the River City. She appeared in several videos on Mars exploration, including ones hosted by UC Davis and in the Finnish documentary film "The Other Side of Mars".

Dawn Sumner's research has been covered in local and national media outlets, including Popular Science, Wired Magazine, KPCC public radio, the television series Take Part, and the BBC.

== See also ==
- Extremophiles
- Astrobiology
- Paleobiology
- Jet Propulsion Laboratory
- John Grotzinger
- Lake Untersee
- Lake Vanda
- Gale Crater
- Geology
- Curiosity Rover
- Microbiology
