= Roger Everett Summons =

Professor of geobiology

Roger Everett Summons FAA FRS
- Born: 11 June 1946 (age 80); Sydney, Australia
- Education: University of New South Wales
- Scientific career
- Fields: Biogeochemistry; Geobiology; Astrobiology
- Workplaces: Australian National University; Geoscience Australia; Massachusetts Institute of Technology
- Thesis: The alkaloids of some Australian and New Guinea plants (1971)
- Doctoral advisors: Emery Gellert; J. Ellis
- Website: summons.mit.edu

Roger Everett Summons FAA FRS (born 11 June 1946) is the Schlumberger Professor of Geobiology, Emeritus, at the Massachusetts Institute of Technology and Professor of Geobiology in the Department of Earth, Atmospheric and Planetary Sciences.

Summons' research spans biogeochemistry, geobiology, and astrobiology. His work employs organic geochemical methods to examine the lipid chemistry of modern and ancient microbes, the isotopic signatures of climate change, and the evolution and origins of life.

Summons was elected a member of the National Academy of Sciences in 2020.

== Education and early life ==
Roger Summons was born on 11 June 1946 in Sydney, and attended Lithgow High School. He earned his BSc (Honours Class I) in 1968 and PhD in 1971 in organic chemistry from the Wollongong University College of the University of New South Wales. This institution is now the University of Wollongong. Summons' doctoral supervisors were professors Emery Gellert and J. Ellis. Following graduation, Summons completed a two-year fellowship in the genetics department, Stanford University, from 1972 to 1973 before starting postdoctoral and research fellowships in the Research School of Chemistry at the Australian National University. At Stanford, Summons worked under the direction of Alan Duffield and Joshua Lederberg.

== Research and career ==
Before joining MIT as a professor of geobiology in 2001, he held appointments at the Australian National University's Research School of Biological Sciences from 1977 to 1983, and at Geoscience Australia, Canberra from 1983 to 2001, where he led a research team that focused on the characterization of the biogeochemical carbon cycle and the nature and habitat of Australian petroleum.

Summons is particularly known for the application of organic geochemical techniques to sediments of Precambrian age and modern microbes to increase the understanding of the early evolution of life on Earth. Summons is a member of the editorial boards of the peer-reviewed scientific journals Astrobiology, Geobiology, and Palaeoworld since their inception. He also served as associate editor of the peer-reviewed scientific journal Geochimica et Cosmochimica Acta from 1995 to 2006.

From 2003 to 2007, Summons served on three committees of the US National Research Council including the Committee on Origin and Evolution of Life, the Committee on Limits of Life, and the Committee on Mars Astrobiology. Summons served as NASA co-chair of the organic contamination panel for the Mars 2020 Rover, and was a member of the NASA Astrobiology Institute Executive Council from 2008 to 2017. During that time, he led the Foundations of Complex Life, the MIT NASA Astrobiology Institute team which interrogated the environmental, ecological, and genetic factors that lead to the evolution of complex life.

In addition to actively teaching both graduate and undergraduate courses at MIT, Summons is engaged as a collaborator with the search for organics on Mars as a member of the SAM Team of NASA's Mars Science Laboratory mission. He is also an investigator in the Simons Collaboration on the Origins of Life (SCOL).

=== Selected papers ===
- Molecular biosignatures: generic qualities of organic compounds that betray biological origins
- Ancient biomolecules: their origin, fossilization and significance in revealing the history of life
- Assessing the distribution of sedimentary C40 carotenoids through time
- Rapid oxidation of Earth's atmosphere 2.33 billion years ago
- Paleoproterozoic sterol biosynthesis and the rise of oxygen
- The 'Dirty Ice' of the McMurdo Ice Shelf: Analogues for biological oases during the Cryogenian
- Organic matter preserved in 3-billion-year-old mudstones at Gale crater
- Steroids, triterpenoids and molecular oxygen
- 2-Methylhopanoids as biomarkers for cyanobacterial oxygenic photosynthesis
- Chlorobiaceae in Palaeozoic seas - Combined evidence from biological markers, isotopes and geology

== Honors and awards ==
- 1987 – 1998 – Fellow, Royal Australian Chemical Institute
- 1998 – Fellow, Australian Academy of Science
- 2002 – Australian Organic Geochemistry Medal
- 2003 – Alfred E. Treibs Award of the Geochemical Society
- 2005 – Halpern Medal, University of Wollongong
- 2006 – Fellow, American Geophysical Union
- 2008 – Alexander von Humboldt Foundation Research Award
- 2008 – Fellow, Royal Society
- 2008 – Moore Distinguished Scholar, Division of Geological and Planetary Sciences, California Institute of Technology
- 2009 – Doctor of Science, Honoris Causa, University of Wollongong
- 2012 – Fellow, American Academy of Microbiology
- 2013 – Honorary Fellow, Hanse-Wissenschaftskolleg (Institute for Advanced Study)
- 2014 – Inaugural Fellow, Australian and New Zealand Society for Mass Spectrometry
- 2015 – Cox visiting professor, School of Earth, Energy and Environmental Sciences, Stanford University (through 2016)
- 2020 – Fellow, National Academy of Sciences (NAS)
