= Lauren Edgar =

American geologist and NASA astronaut candidate (born 1985)

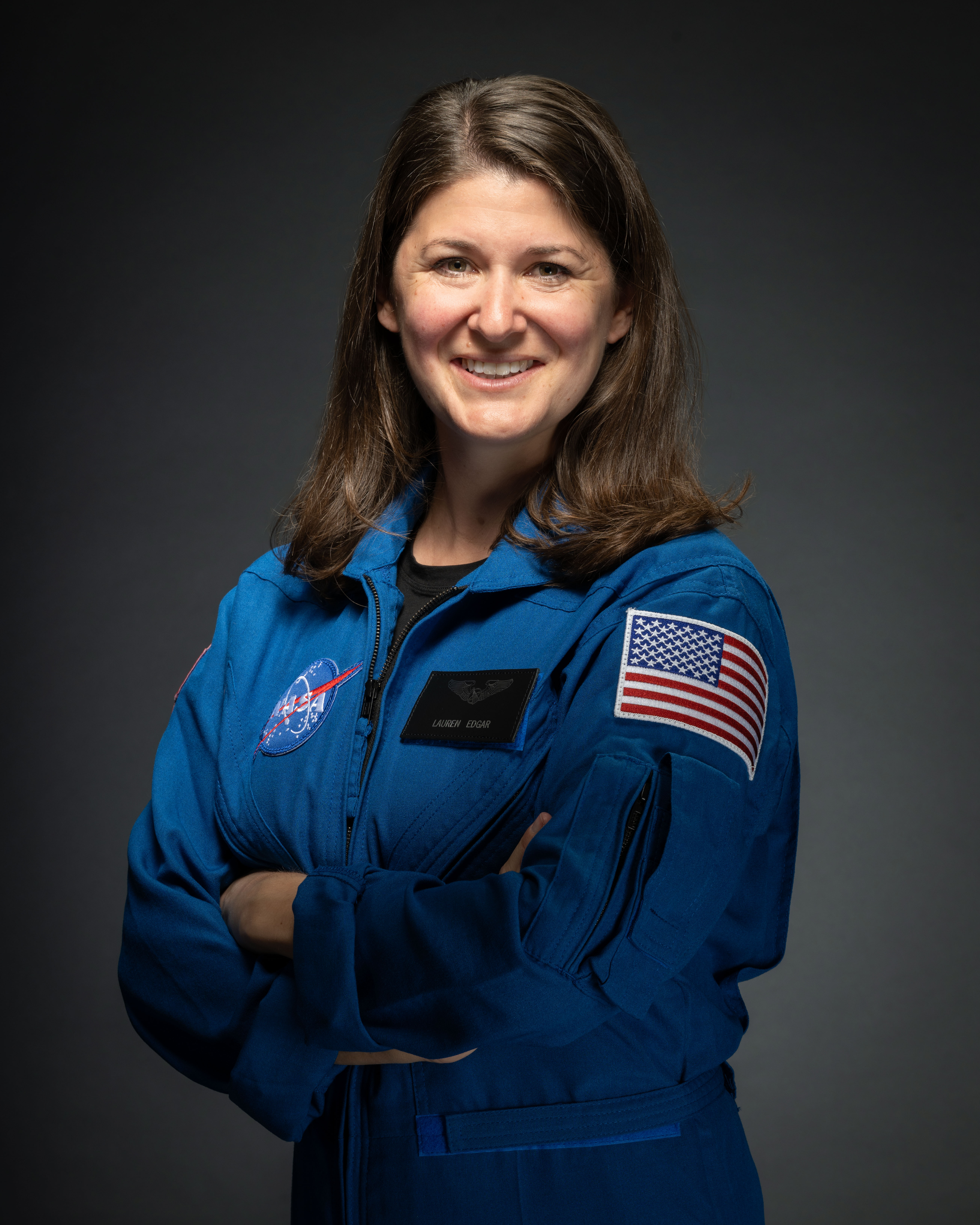
- Edgar in 2025
- Born: Lauren Ashley Edgar; August 17, 1985 (age 41); Washington D.C., U.S.
- Education: Dartmouth College (BS); California Institute of Technology (MS, PhD)
- Space career

NASA astronaut candidate
- Selection: NASA Group 24 (2025)
- Scientific career
- Workplaces: United States Geological Survey; NASA
- Thesis: Identifying and Interpreting Stratification in Sedimentary Rocks on Mars: Insight from Rover and Orbital Observations and Terrestrial Field Analogs (2013)
- Doctoral advisor: John P. Grotzinger

Lauren Edgar (born 1985) is an American geologist and NASA astronaut candidate.

== Early life and education ==
Edgar was born in Washington, D.C. in 1985, but considers Sammamish, Washington to be her hometown. Edgar attended Discovery Elementary School and Skyline High School.

Edgar was part of Dartmouth College's Class of 2007, originally majoring in engineering before switching to earth sciences. She earned her master’s and doctorate in geology at Caltech under the direction of John P. Grotzinger.

== Career ==
Edgar previously worked for the United States Geological Survey as a research geologist at the USGS Astrogeology Science Center in Flagstaff, Arizona.
