= Geobiology =

Study of interactions between Earth and the biosphere

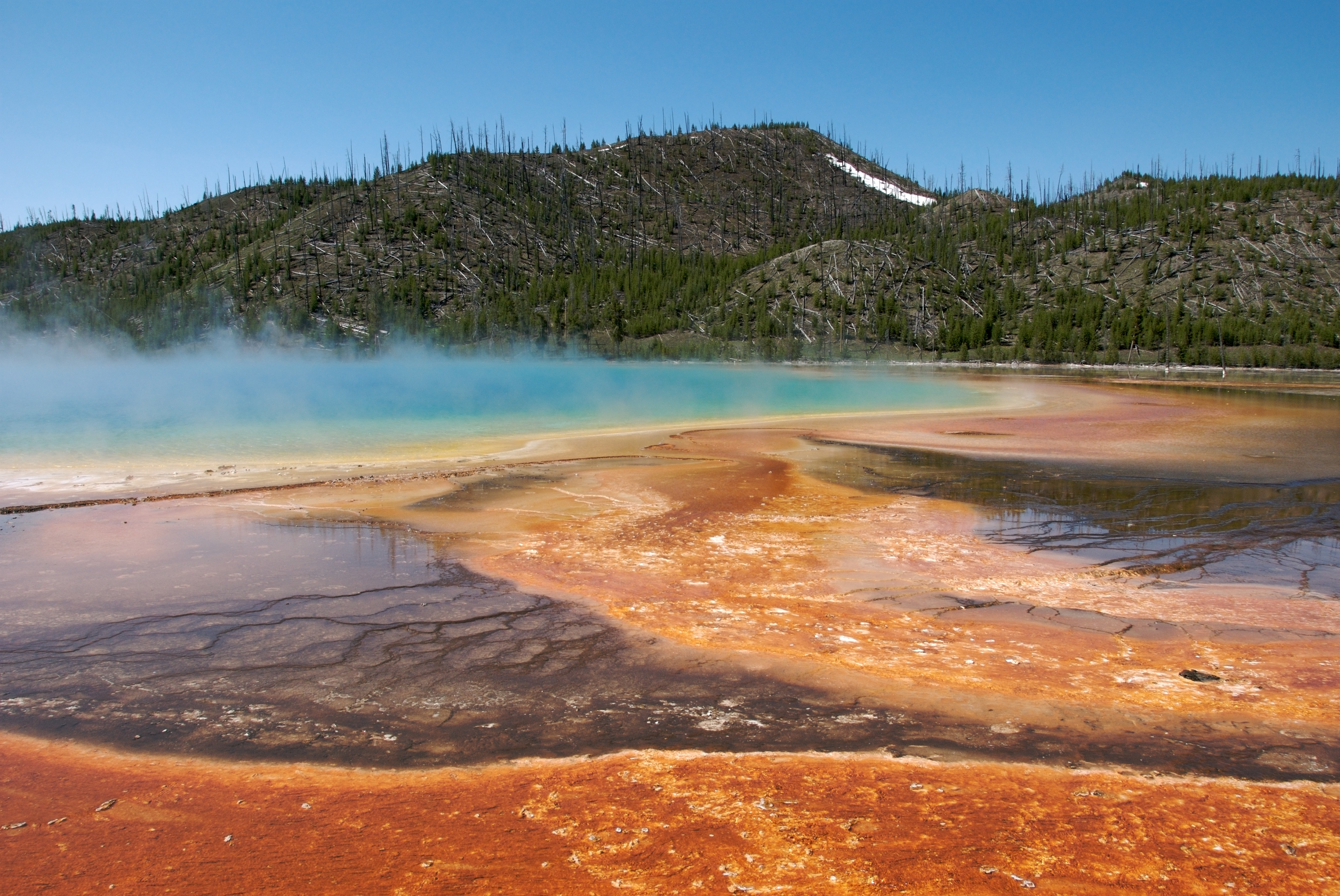
The colorful microbial mats of Grand Prismatic Spring in Yellowstone National Park, USA. The orange mats are composed of Chloroflexia, "Cyanobacteria", and other organisms that thrive in the 70˚C water. Geobiologists often study extreme environments like this because they are home to extremophilic organisms. It has been hypothesized that these environments may be representative of early Earth.

Geobiology is a field of scientific research that explores the interactions between the physical Earth and the biosphere. It is a relatively young field, and its borders are fluid. There is a considerable overlap with the fields of ecology, evolutionary biology, microbiology, paleontology, and particularly soil science and biogeochemistry. Geobiology applies the principles and methods of biology, geology, and soil science to the study of the ancient history of the co-evolution of life and Earth as well as the role of life in the modern world. Geobiological studies tend to be focused on microorganisms, and on the role that life plays in altering the chemical and physical environment of the pedosphere, which exists at the intersection of the lithosphere, atmosphere, hydrosphere and/or cryosphere. It differs from biogeochemistry in that the focus is on processes and organisms over space and time rather than on global chemical cycles.

Even though the terms biogeology and geobiology are often used interchangeably, they have slightly different definitions. Biogeology refers to the field of science where biological aspects of geology, or the interaction between the biosphere and lithosphere is studied. Whereas the extent of Geobiology spans much wider. The scope of geobiology has also evolved and expanded over time, now comprising secondary disciplines such as geomicrobiology, geoecology, molecular geobiology, biogeochemistry, paleobiology, applied geobiology etc.

Geobiological research synthesizes the geologic record with modern biological studies. It deals with process - how organisms affect the Earth and vice versa - as well as history - how the Earth and life have changed together. It's an all encompassing field which tries to understand the interactions between the living system and the geological and geochemical surroundings of where it evolved. Much research is grounded in the search for fundamental understanding, but geobiology can also be applied, as in the case of microbes that clean up oil spills.

Geobiology employs molecular biology, environmental microbiology, organic geochemistry, and the geologic record to investigate the evolutionary interconnectedness of life and Earth. It attempts to understand how the Earth has changed since the origin of life and what it might have been like along the way. Some definitions of geobiology even push the boundaries of this time frame - to understanding the origin of life and to the role that humans have played and will continue to play in shaping the Earth in the Anthropocene.

== History ==
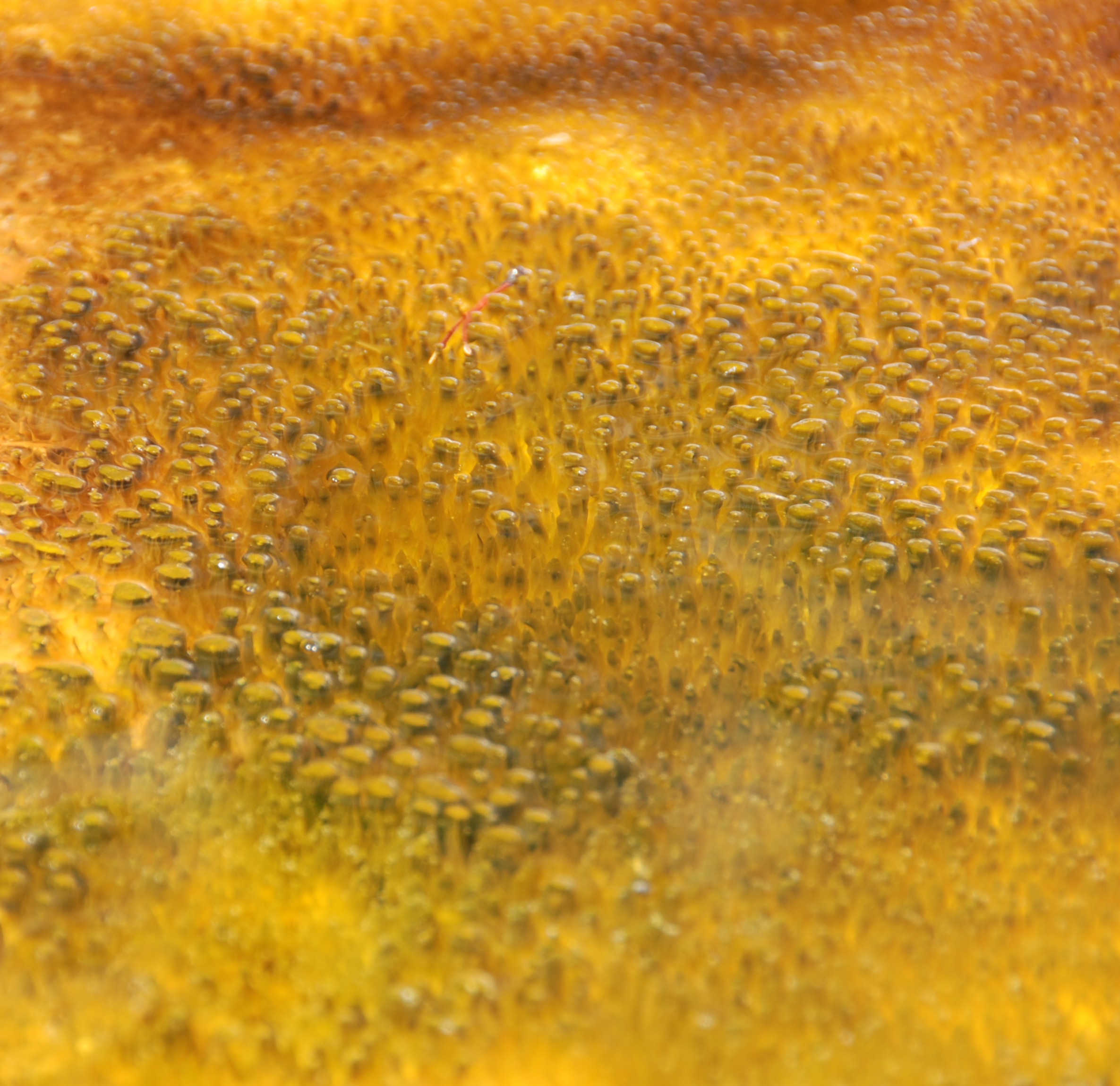
A microbial mat in White Creek, Yellowstone National Park, USA. Note the conical microstructure of the bacterial communities. These are hypothesized to be a living analogue of ancient fossil stromatolites. Each cone has an oxygen gas bubble on top, the product of oxygenic photosynthesis by cyanobacteria in the multi-species microbial mats.

The term geobiology was coined by Lourens Baas Becking in 1934. In his words, geobiology "is an attempt to describe the relationship between organisms and the Earth," for "the organism is part of the Earth and its lot is interwoven with that of the Earth." Baas Becking's definition of geobiology was born of a desire to unify environmental biology with laboratory biology. The way he practiced it aligns closely with modern environmental microbial ecology, though his definition remains applicable to all of geobiology. In his book, Geobiology, Bass Becking stated that he had no intention of inventing a new field of study. Baas Becking's understanding of geobiology was heavily influenced by his predecessors, including Martinus Beyerinck, his teacher from the Dutch School of Microbiology. Others included Vladimir Vernadsky, who argued that life changes the surface environment of Earth in The Biosphere, his 1926 book, and Sergei Vinogradsky, famous for discovering lithotrophic bacteria.

Baas Becking started writing his book Geobiologie in the late summer of 1944, when he was a prisoner of the German Kriegsmarine in Utrecht. With limited access to resources and scientific literature, he drafted the manuscript on a ledger, in barely legible handwriting. His manuscript, which he finished in just seven weeks, was heavily inspired by the works of his predecessors including Lawrence Henderson, Victor Moritz Goldschmidt, Alfred J. Lotka, Vladimir Vernadsky and Martinus Beyarink. In his book, he introduced the concept of dissipation, where he expressed his frustrations on the disastrous treatment of the earth by man. Despite being unfinished with major gaps, Baas Becking's Geobiologe is still one of the most foundational and influential works in the field of geobiology.

The first laboratory officially dedicated to the study of geobiology was the Baas Becking Geobiological Laboratory in Australia, which opened its doors in 1965. However, it took another 40 or so years for geobiology to become a firmly rooted scientific discipline, thanks in part to advances in geochemistry and genetics that enabled scientists to begin to synthesize the study of life and planet.

In the 1930s, Alfred Treibs discovered chlorophyll-like porphyrins in petroleum, confirming its biological origin, thereby founding organic geochemistry and establishing the notion of biomarkers, a critical aspect of geobiology. But several decades passed before the tools were available to begin to search in earnest for chemical marks of life in the rocks. In the 1970s and '80s, scientists like Geoffrey Eglington and Roger Summons began to find lipid biomarkers in the rock record using equipment like GCMS.

On the biology side of things, in 1977, Carl Woese and George Fox published a phylogeny of life on Earth, including a new domain - the Archaea. And in the 1990s, genetics and genomics studies became possible, broadening the scope of investigation of the interaction of life and planet.

Today, geobiology has its own journals, such as Geobiology, established in 2003, and Biogeosciences, established in 2004, as well as recognition at major scientific conferences. It got its own Gordon Research Conference in 2011, a number of geobiology textbooks have been published, and many universities around the world offer degree programs in geobiology (see External links).

== Major geobiological events ==
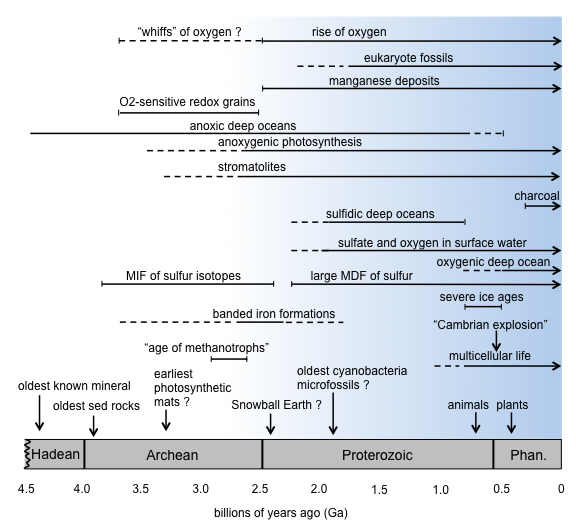
The geologic timescale overlain with major geobiologic events and occurrences. The oxygenation of the atmosphere is shown in blue starting 2.4 Ga, although the exact dating of the Great Oxygenation Event is debated.

Perhaps the most profound geobiological event is the introduction of oxygen into the atmosphere by photosynthetic bacteria. This oxygenation of Earth's primordial atmosphere (the so-called oxygen catastrophe or Great Oxygenation Event) and the oxygenation of the oceans altered surface biogeochemical cycles and the types of organisms that have been evolutionarily selected for.

A subsequent major change was the advent of multicellularity. The presence of oxygen allowed eukaryotes and, later, multicellular life to evolve.

More anthropocentric geobiologic events include the origin of animals and the establishment of terrestrial plant life, which affected continental erosion and nutrient cycling, and likely changed the types of rivers observed, allowing channelization of what were previously predominantly braided rivers.

More subtle geobiological events include the role of termites in overturning sediments, coral reefs in depositing calcium carbonate and breaking waves, sponges in absorbing dissolved marine silica, the role of dinosaurs in breaching river levees and promoting flooding, and the role of large mammal dung in distributing nutrients.

S.G Neruchev (1927-2012), a petroleum geologist, described seventeen major geobiologic events in his 1999 paper, titled, "Periodicity of global geologic and biologic events in the Phanerozoic". He described these events chronologically, based on where black shales (organic rich, radioactive, copper, bituminous) were found.

== Important concepts ==
Geobiology is founded upon a few core concepts that unite the study of Earth and life. While there are many aspects of studying past and present interactions between life and Earth that are unclear, several important ideas and concepts provide a basis of knowledge in geobiology that serve as a platform for posing researchable questions, including the evolution of life and planet and the co-evolution of the two, genetics - from both a historical and functional standpoint, the metabolic diversity of all life, the sedimentological preservation of past life, and the origin of life.

=== Co-evolution of Life and Earth ===
A core concept in geobiology is that life changes over time through evolution. The theory of evolution postulates that unique populations of organisms or species arose from genetic modifications in the ancestral population which were passed down by drift and natural selection.

Along with standard biological evolution, life and planets co-evolve. Since the best adaptations are those that suit the ecological niche that the organism lives in, the physical and chemical characteristics of the environment drive the evolution of life by natural selection, but the opposite can also be true: with every advent of evolution, the environment changes.

A classic example of co-evolution is the evolution of oxygen-producing photosynthetic cyanobacteria which oxygenated Earth's Archean atmosphere. The ancestors of cyanobacteria began using water as an electron source to harness the energy of the sun and expelling oxygen before or during the early Paleoproterozoic. During this time, around 2.4 to 2.1 billion years ago, geologic data suggests that atmospheric oxygen began to rise in what is termed the Great Oxygenation Event (GOE). It is unclear for how long cyanobacteria had been doing oxygenic photosynthesis before the GOE. Some evidence suggests there were geochemical "buffers" or sinks suppressing the rise of oxygen such as volcanism though cyanobacteria may have been around producing it before the GOE. Other evidence indicates that the rise of oxygenic photosynthesis was coincident with the GOE.

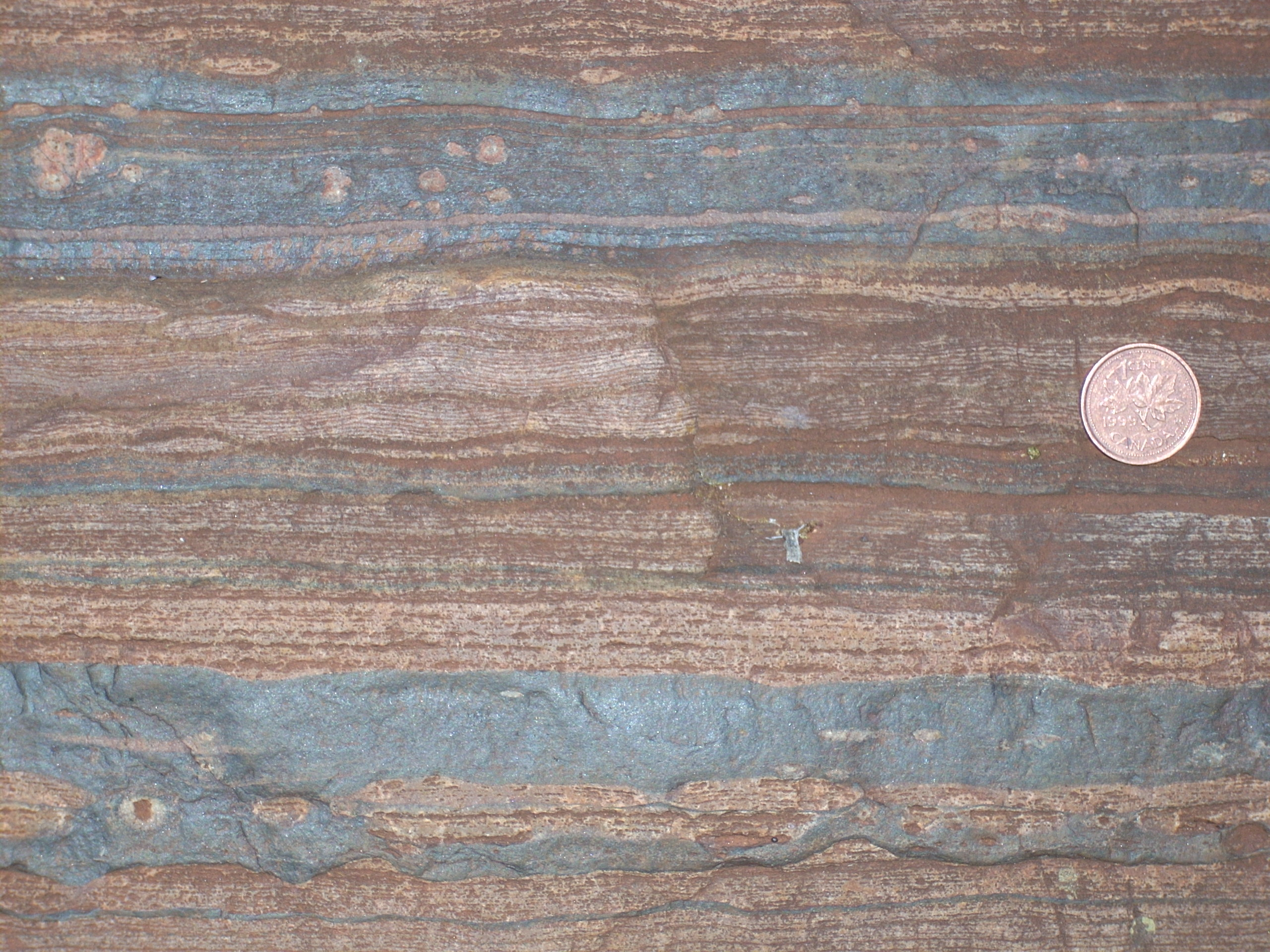
Banded iron formation (BIF), Hammersley Formation, Western Australia

The presence of oxygen on Earth from its first production by cyanobacteria to the GOE and through today has drastically impacted the course of evolution of life and planet. It may have triggered the formation of oxidized minerals and the disappearance of oxidizable minerals like pyrite from ancient stream beds. The presence of banded-iron formations (BIFs) have been interpreted as a clue for the rise of oxygen since small amounts of oxygen could have reacted with reduced ferrous iron (Fe(II)) in the oceans, resulting in the deposition of sediments containing Fe(III) oxide in places like Western Australia. However, any oxidizing environment, including that provided by microbes such as the iron-oxidizing photoautotroph Rhodopseudomonas palustris, can trigger iron oxide formation and thus BIF deposition. Other mechanisms include oxidation by UV light. Indeed, BIFs occur across large swaths of Earth's history and may not correlate with only one event.

Pyrite has been hypothesized as the first source of energy that paved the way of life formation. In Early earth, and even now, phosphate was generally considered a limiting nutrient for life. Pyrite, being positively charged, can concentrate anionic phosphate and phosphorylated organic molecules. The free energy yield from anaerobic biomineralization of pyrites by chemoautotrophs is enough for supporting life.

Some scientists have also proposed that clay minerals facilitated the origin of life. Clay and clay minerals, such as kaolinite and montmorillonite, have been widely distributed in geologic time and space. Clay mineral surfaces concentrated simple organic molecules and protected and preserved them. This process could also occur on other planets, comets, meteorites and asteroids.

The beginning of oxygenic photosynthesis has inevitably resulted in a wide range of reductants and oxidants, which expanded the metabolic diversity in microorganisms, particularly sulfur cycle. Anoxic conditions in the early ocean made sulfate limited due to pyrite formation and precipitation. After GOE, oxidative weathering of sulfide minerals such as pyrite increased rapidly. This resulted in increased sulfate transport in the ocean, which facilitated the evolution of other sulfur metabolisms like thiosulfate oxidation and reduction via sox pathway.

Other trace element availability like Ni, Co, Cu, Fe, Cr etc have also impacted early life formation on Earth.

Other changes correlated with the rise of oxygen include the appearance of rust-red ancient paleosols, different isotope fractionation of elements such as sulfur, and global glaciations and Snowball Earth events, perhaps caused by the oxidation of methane by oxygen, not to mention an overhaul of the types of organisms and metabolisms on Earth. Whereas organisms prior to the rise of oxygen were likely poisoned by oxygen gas as many anaerobes are today, those that evolved ways to harness the electron-accepting and energy-giving power of oxygen were poised to thrive and colonize the aerobic environment.

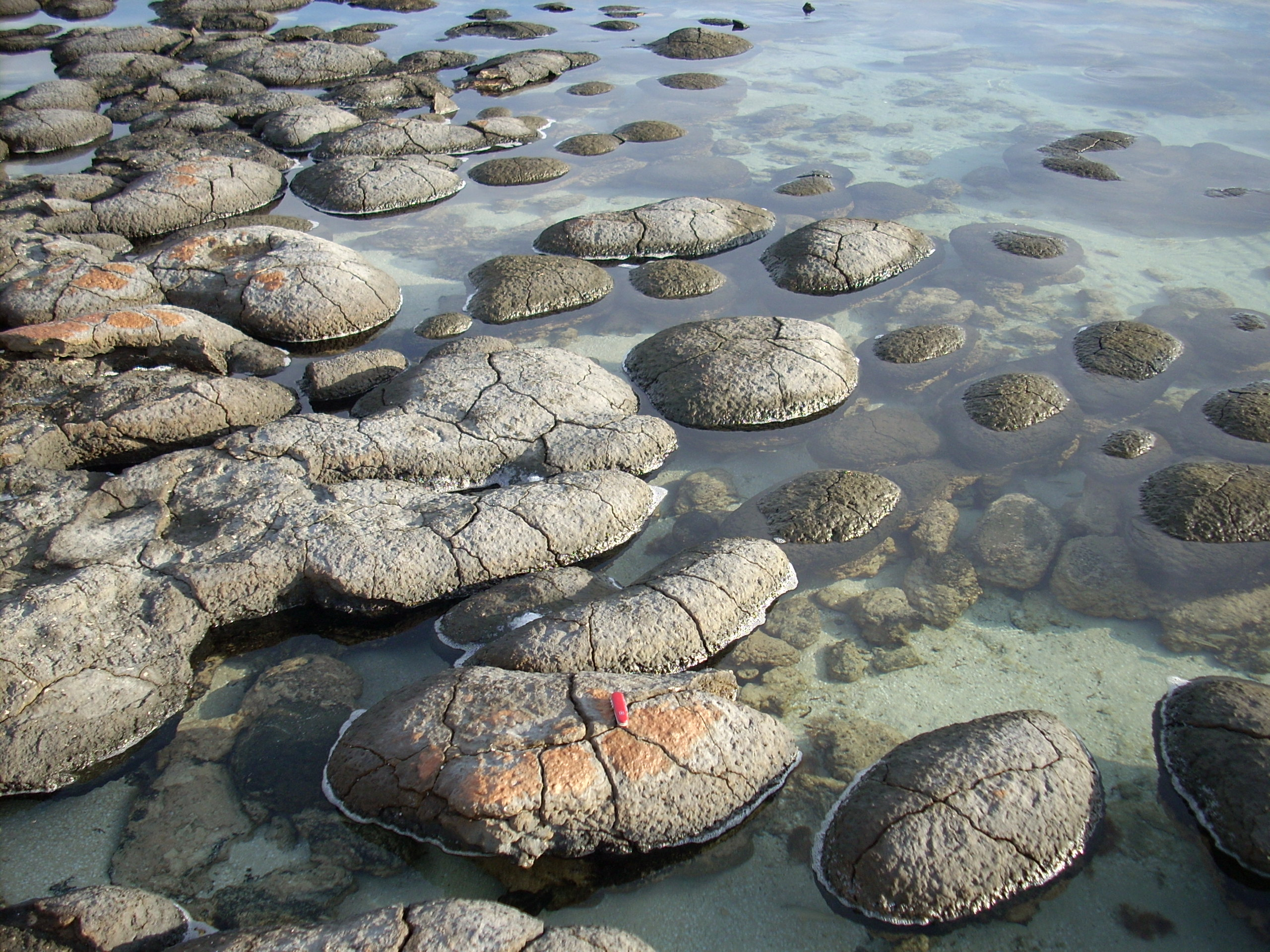
Modern, living stromatolites in Shark Bay, Australia. Shark Bay is one of the few places in the world where stromatolites can be seen today, though they were likely common in ancient shallow seas before the rise of metazoan predators.

=== The Earth has changed ===
Earth has not remained the same since its planetary formation 4.5 billion years ago. Continents have formed, broken up, and collided, offering new opportunities for and barriers to the dispersal of life. The redox state of the atmosphere and the oceans has changed, as indicated by isotopic data. Fluctuating quantities of inorganic compounds such as carbon dioxide, nitrogen, methane, and oxygen have been driven by life evolving new biological metabolisms to make these chemicals and have driven the evolution of new metabolisms to use those chemicals. Earth acquired a magnetic field about 3.4 Ga that has undergone a series of geomagnetic reversals on the order of millions of years. The surface temperature is in constant fluctuation, falling in glaciations and Snowball Earth events due to ice–albedo feedback, rising and melting due to volcanic outgassing, and stabilizing due to silicate weathering feedback.

The Earth is not the only to change - the luminosity of the sun has increased over time. Because rocks record a history of relatively constant temperatures since Earth's beginnings, there must have been more greenhouse gasses to keep the temperatures up in the Archean when the sun was younger and fainter. All these major differences in the environment of the Earth placed different constraints on the evolution of life throughout our planet's history. Subtle changes in the habitat of life are always occurring, shaping the organisms and traces that we observe today and in the rock record.

=== Genes encode geobiological function and history ===
The genetic code is key to observing the history of evolution and understanding the capabilities of organisms. Genes are the basic unit of inheritance and function and, as such, they are the basic unit of evolution and the means behind metabolism.

==== Phylogeny predicts evolutionary history ====
A phylogenetic tree of living things, based on rRNA data and proposed by Carl Woese, showing the separation of bacteria, archaea, and eukaryotes and linking the three branches of living organisms to the LUCA (the black trunk at the bottom of the tree).

Phylogeny takes genetic sequences from living organisms and compares them to each other to reveal evolutionary relationships, much like a family tree reveals how individuals are connected to their distant cousins. It allows us to decipher modern relationships and infer how evolution happened in the past.

Phylogeny can give some sense of history when combined with a little bit more information. Each difference in the DNA indicates divergence between one species and another. This divergence, whether via drift or natural selection, is representative of some lapse of time. Comparing DNA sequences alone gives a record of the history of evolution with an arbitrary measure of phylogenetic distance "dating" that last common ancestor. However, if information about the rate of genetic mutation is available or geologic markers are present to calibrate evolutionary divergence (i.e. fossils), we have a timeline of evolution. From there, with an idea about other contemporaneous changes in life and environment, we can begin to speculate why certain evolutionary paths might have been selected for.

==== Genes encode metabolism ====
Molecular biology allows scientists to understand a gene's function using microbial culturing and mutagenesis. Searching for similar genes in other organisms and in metagenomic and metatranscriptomic data allows us to understand what processes could be relevant and important in a given ecosystem, providing insight into the biogeochemical cycles in that environment.

For example, an intriguing problem in geobiology is the role of organisms in the global cycling of methane. Genetics has revealed that the methane monooxygenase gene (pmo) is used for oxidizing methane and is present in all aerobic methane-oxidizers, or methanotrophs. The presence of DNA sequences of the pmo gene in the environment can be used as a proxy for methanotrophy. A more generalizable tool is the 16S ribosomal RNA gene, which is found in bacteria and archaea. This gene evolves very slowly over time and is not usually horizontally transferred, and so it is often used to distinguish different taxonomic units of organisms in the environment. In this way, genes are clues to organismal metabolism and identity. Genetics enables us to ask 'who is there?' and 'what are they doing?' This approach is called metagenomics.

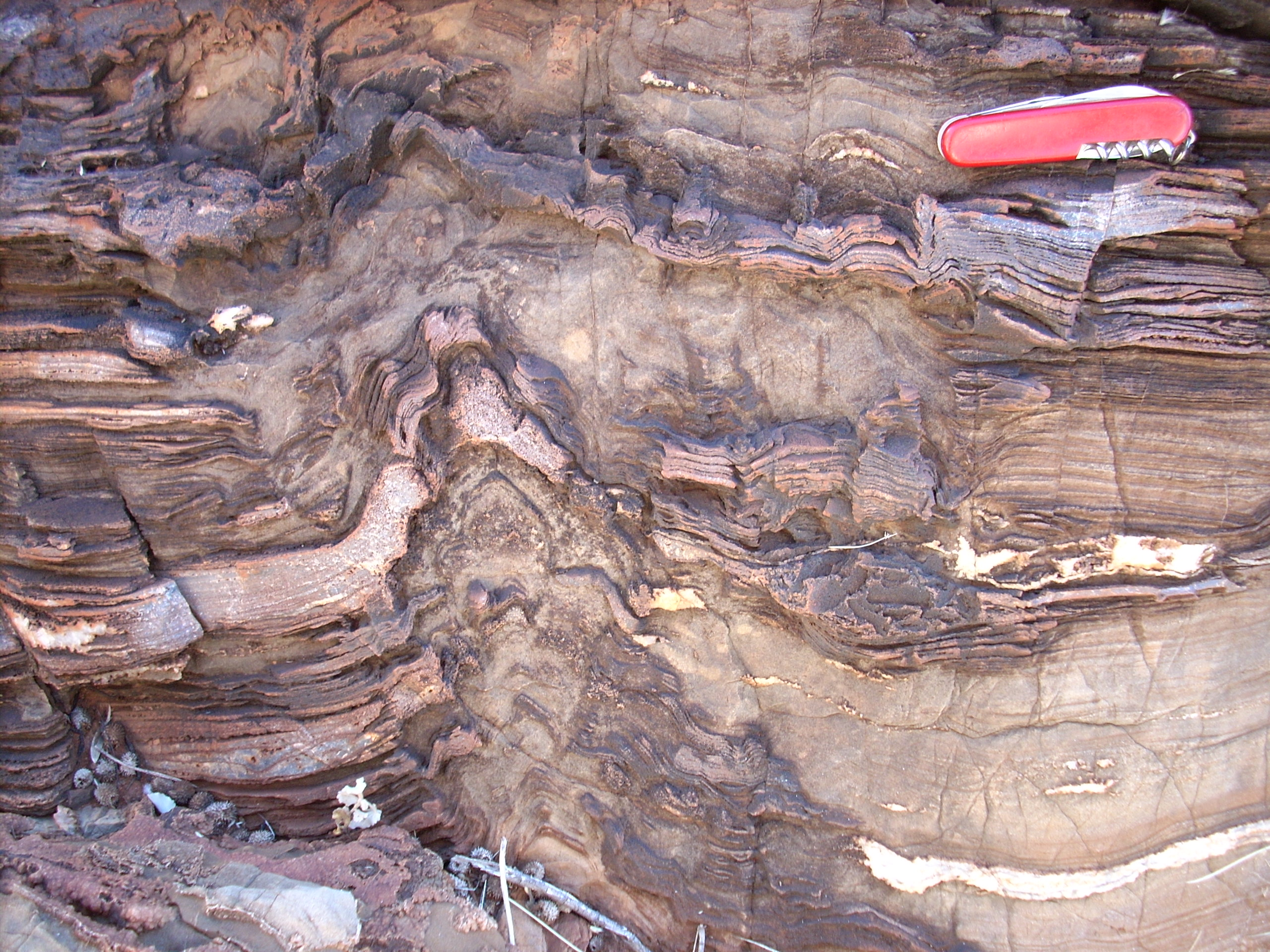
3.4 billion year-old stromatolites from the Warrawoona Group, Western Australia. While the origin of Precambrian stromatolites is a heavily debated topic in geobiology, stromatolites from Warrawoona are hypothesized to have been formed by ancient communities of microbes.

=== Metabolic diversity influences the environment ===
Microbial life on Earth evolved around 3.5 billion years ago. Given the fact that the earth is about 4.5 billion years old, they have occupied about 87% of Earth's History. Since their origin, microbes have established, maintained and improved all major biogeochemical cycles for billions of years. So it is not an overstatement to say microbes are the foundation of the biosphere.

Life harnesses chemical reactions to generate energy, perform biosynthesis, and eliminate waste. Different organisms use very different metabolic approaches to meet these basic needs. While animals such as ourselves are limited to aerobic respiration, other organisms can "breathe" sulfate (SO42-), nitrate (NO3-), ferric iron (Fe(III)), and uranium (U(VI)), or live off energy from fermentation. Some organisms, like plants, are autotrophs, meaning that they can fix carbon dioxide for biosynthesis. Plants are photoautotrophs, in that they use the energy of light to fix carbon. Microorganisms employ oxygenic and anoxygenic photoautotrophy, as well as chemoautotrophy. Microbial communities can coordinate in syntrophic metabolisms to shift reaction kinetics in their favor. Many organisms can perform multiple metabolisms to achieve the same end goal; these are called mixotrophs.

Biotic metabolism is directly tied to the global cycling of elements and compounds on Earth. The geochemical environment fuels life, which then produces different molecules that go into the external environment. (This is directly relevant to biogeochemistry.) In addition, biochemical reactions are catalyzed by enzymes which sometimes prefer one isotope over others. For example, oxygenic photosynthesis is catalyzed by RuBisCO, which prefers carbon-12 over carbon-13, resulting in carbon isotope fractionation in the rock record.

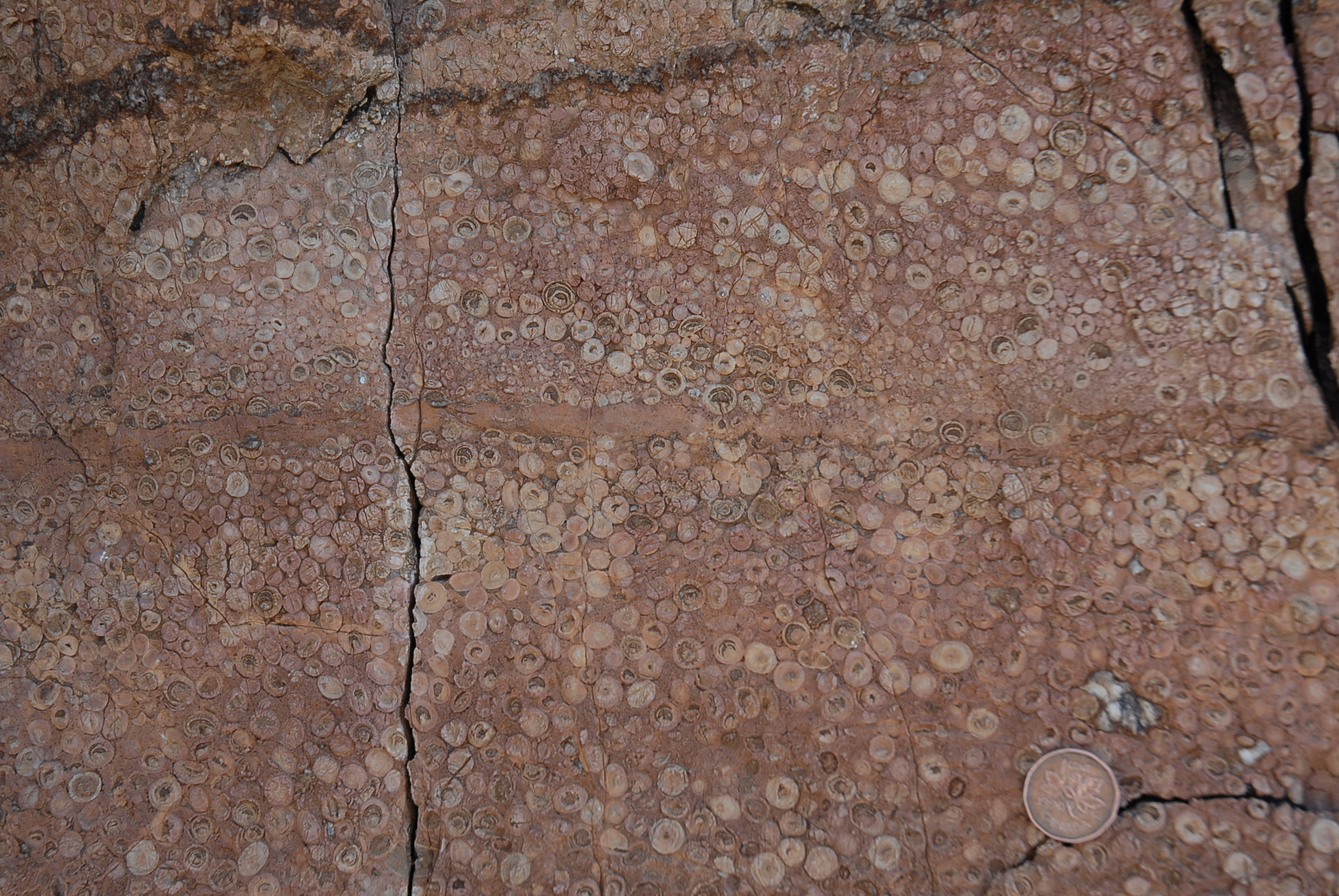
"Giant" ooids of the Johnnie Formation in the Death Valley area, California, USA. Ooids are near-spheroidal calcium carbonate grains that accumulate around a central nucleus and can be sedimented to form oolite like this. Microbes can mediate the formation of ooids.

=== Sedimentary rocks tell a story ===
Sedimentary rocks preserve remnants of the history of life on Earth in the form of fossils, biomarkers, isotopes, and other traces. The rock record is far from perfect, and the preservation of biosignatures is a rare occurrence. Understanding what factors determine the extent of preservation and the meaning behind what is preserved are important components to detangling the ancient history of the co-evolution of life and Earth. The sedimentary record allows scientists to observe changes in life and Earth in composition over time and sometimes even date major transitions, like extinction events.

Some classic examples of geobiology in the sedimentary record include stromatolites and banded-iron formations. The role of life in the origin of both of these is a heavily debated topic.

=== Life is fundamentally chemistry ===
The first life arose from abiotic chemical reactions. When this happened, how it happened, and even what planet it happened on are uncertain. However, life follows the rules of and arose from lifeless chemistry and physics. It is constrained by principles such as thermodynamics. This is an important concept in the field because it represents the epitome of the interconnectedness, if not sameness, of life and Earth.

While often delegated to the field of astrobiology, attempts to understand how and when life arose are relevant to geobiology as well. The first major strides towards understanding the "how" came with the Miller-Urey experiment, when amino acids formed out of a simulated "primordial soup". Another theory is that life originated in a system much like the hydrothermal vents at mid-oceanic spreading centers. In the Fischer-Tropsch synthesis, a variety of hydrocarbons form under vent-like conditions. Other ideas include the "RNA World" hypothesis, which postulates that the first biologic molecule was RNA, and the idea that life originated elsewhere in the Solar System and was brought to Earth, perhaps via a meteorite.

== Methodology ==
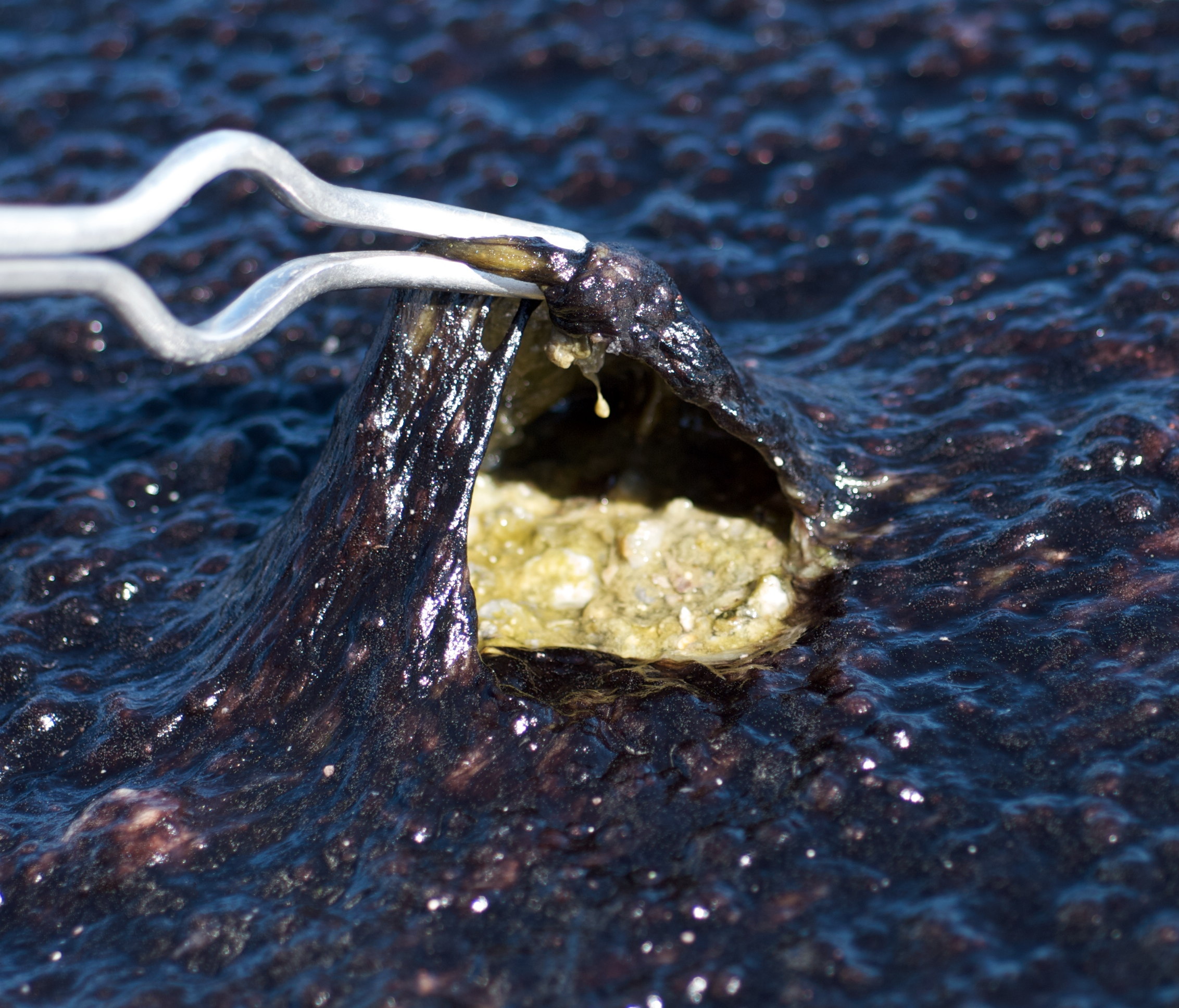
A microbial mat growing on acidic soil in Norris Geyser basin, Yellowstone National Park, USA. The black top serves as a sort of sunscreen, and when you look underneath you see the green cyanobacteria.

Geobiology is a diverse field, encompassing ideas and techniques from a wide range of disciplines, therefore there are a number of methods that are important to the study of the interaction of life and Earth that are highlighted here:

1. Laboratory culturing of microbes is used to characterize the metabolism and lifestyle of organisms of interest.
2. Gene sequencing allows scientists to study the relationships between extant organisms using phylogenetics.
3. Experimental genetic manipulation or mutagenesis is used to determine the function of genes in living organisms.
4. Microscopy is used to visualize the microbial world. Microscope work ranges from environmental observation to quantitative studies with DNA probes to high-definition visualization of the microbe-mineral interface by electron microscope (EM).
5. Isotope tracers can be used to track biochemical reactions to understand microbial metabolism.
6. Isotope natural abundance in rocks can be measured to look for isotopic fractionation that is consistent with biologic origin.
7. Detailed environmental characterization is important to understanding what about a habitat might be driving life's evolution and, in turn, how life might be changing that niche. It includes and is not limited to, temperature, light, pH, salinity, concentration of specific molecules like oxygen, and the biologic community.
8. Sedimentology and stratigraphy are used to read the rocks. The rock record stores a history of geobiologic processes in sediments which can be unearthed through an understanding of deposition, sedimentation, compaction, diagenesis, and deformation.
9. The search for and study of fossils, while often delegated to the separate field of paleontology, is important in geobiology, though the scale of fossils is typically smaller (micropaleontology).
10. The biochemical analysis of biomarkers, which are fossilized or modern molecules that are indicative of the presence of a certain group of organisms or metabolism, is used to answer the evidence for life and metabolic diversity questions.
11. Paleomagnetics is the study of the planet's ancient magnetic field. It is significant to understanding magnetofossils, biomineralization, and global ecosystem changes.

== Sub-disciplines and related fields ==
As its name suggests, geobiology is closely related to many other fields of study, and does not have clearly defined boundaries or perfect agreement on what exactly they comprise. Some practitioners take a very broad view of its boundaries, encompassing many older, more established fields such as biogeochemistry, paleontology, and microbial ecology. Others take a more narrow view, assigning it to emerging research that falls between these existing fields, such as with geomicrobiology. The following list includes both those that are clearly a part of geobiology, e.g. geomicrobiology, as well as those that share scientific interests but have not historically been considered a sub-discipline of geobiology, e.g. paleontology.

=== Astrobiology ===
Astrobiology is an interdisciplinary field that uses a combination of geobiological and planetary science data to establish a context for the search for life on other planets. The origin of life from non-living chemistry and geology, or abiogenesis, is a major topic in astrobiology. Even though it is fundamentally an earth-bound concern, and therefore of great geobiological interest, getting at the origin of life necessitates considering what life requires, what, if anything, is special about Earth, what might have changed to allow life to blossom, what constitutes evidence for life, and even what constitutes life itself. These are the same questions that scientists might ask when searching for alien life. In addition, astrobiologists research the possibility of life based on other metabolisms and elements, the survivability of Earth's organisms on other planets or spacecraft, planetary and solar system evolution, and space geochemistry.

=== Biogeochemistry ===
Biogeochemistry is a systems science that synthesizes the study of biological, geological, and chemical processes to understand the reactions and composition of the natural environment. It is concerned primarily with global elemental cycles, such as that of nitrogen and carbon. The father of biogeochemistry was James Lovelock, whose "Gaia hypothesis" proposed that Earth's biological, chemical, and geologic systems interact to stabilize the conditions on Earth that support life.

=== Geobiochemistry ===
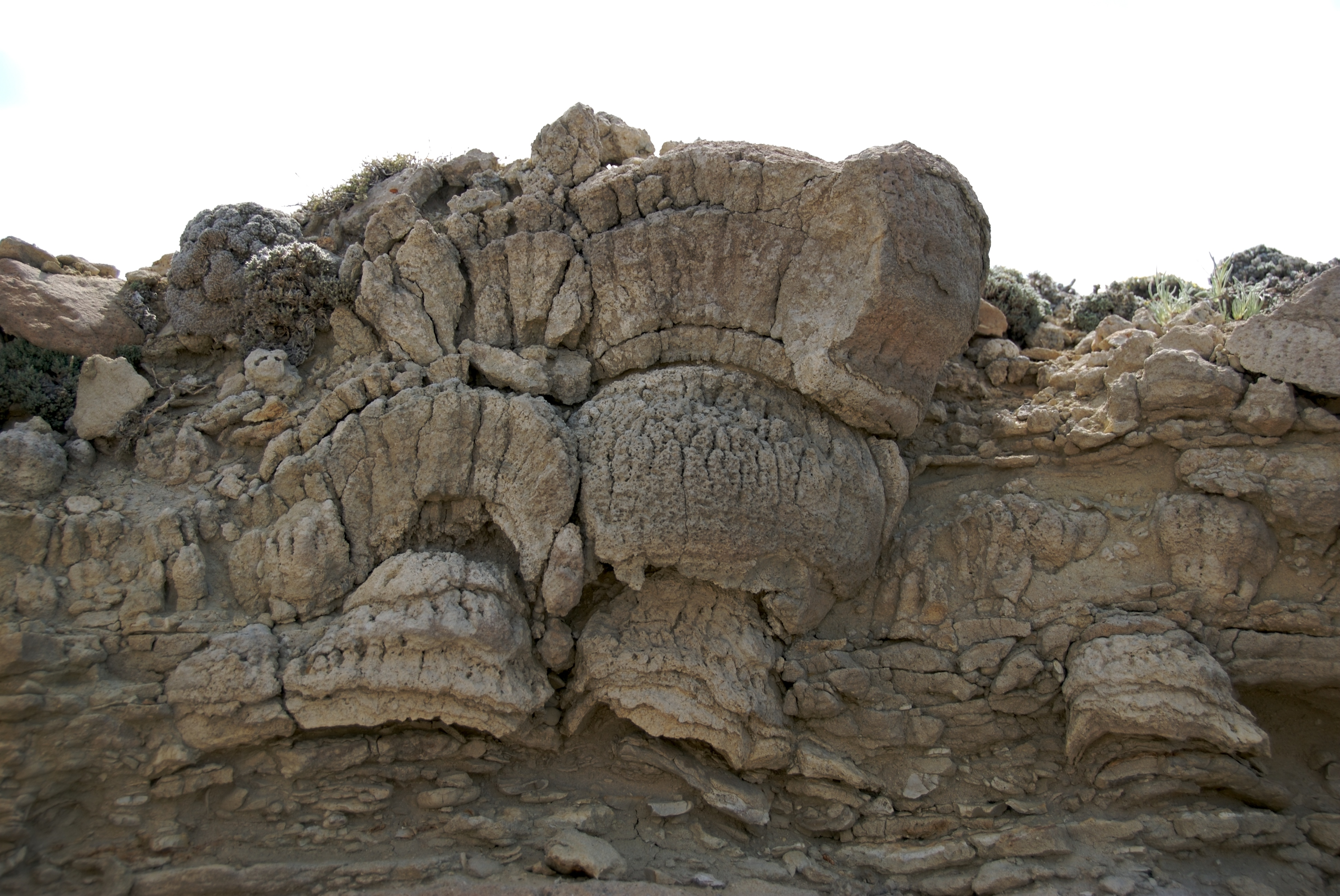
Stromatolites in the Green River Shale, Wyoming, USA, dating to the Eocene

Geobiochemistry is similar to biogeochemistry, but differs by placing emphasis on the effects of geology on the development of life's biochemical processes, as distinct from the role of life on Earth's cycles. Its primary goal is to link biological changes, encompassing evolutionary modifications of genes and changes in the expression of genes and proteins, to changes in the temperature, pressure, and composition of geochemical processes to understand when and how metabolism evolved. Geobiochemistry is founded on the notion that life is a planetary response because metabolic catalysis enables the release of energy trapped by a cooling planet.

=== Environmental microbiology ===
Microbiology is a broad scientific discipline pertaining to the study of that life which is best viewed under a microscope. It encompasses several fields that are of direct relevance to geobiology, and the tools of microbiology all pertain to geobiology. Environmental microbiology is especially entangled in geobiology since it seeks an understanding of the actual organisms and processes that are relevant in nature, as opposed to the traditional lab-based approach to microbiology. Microbial ecology is similar, but tend to focus more on lab studies and the relationships between organisms within a community, as well as within the ecosystem of their chemical and geological physical environment. Both rely on techniques such as sample collection from diverse environments, metagenomics, DNA sequencing, and statistics.

=== Geomicrobiology and microbial geochemistry ===
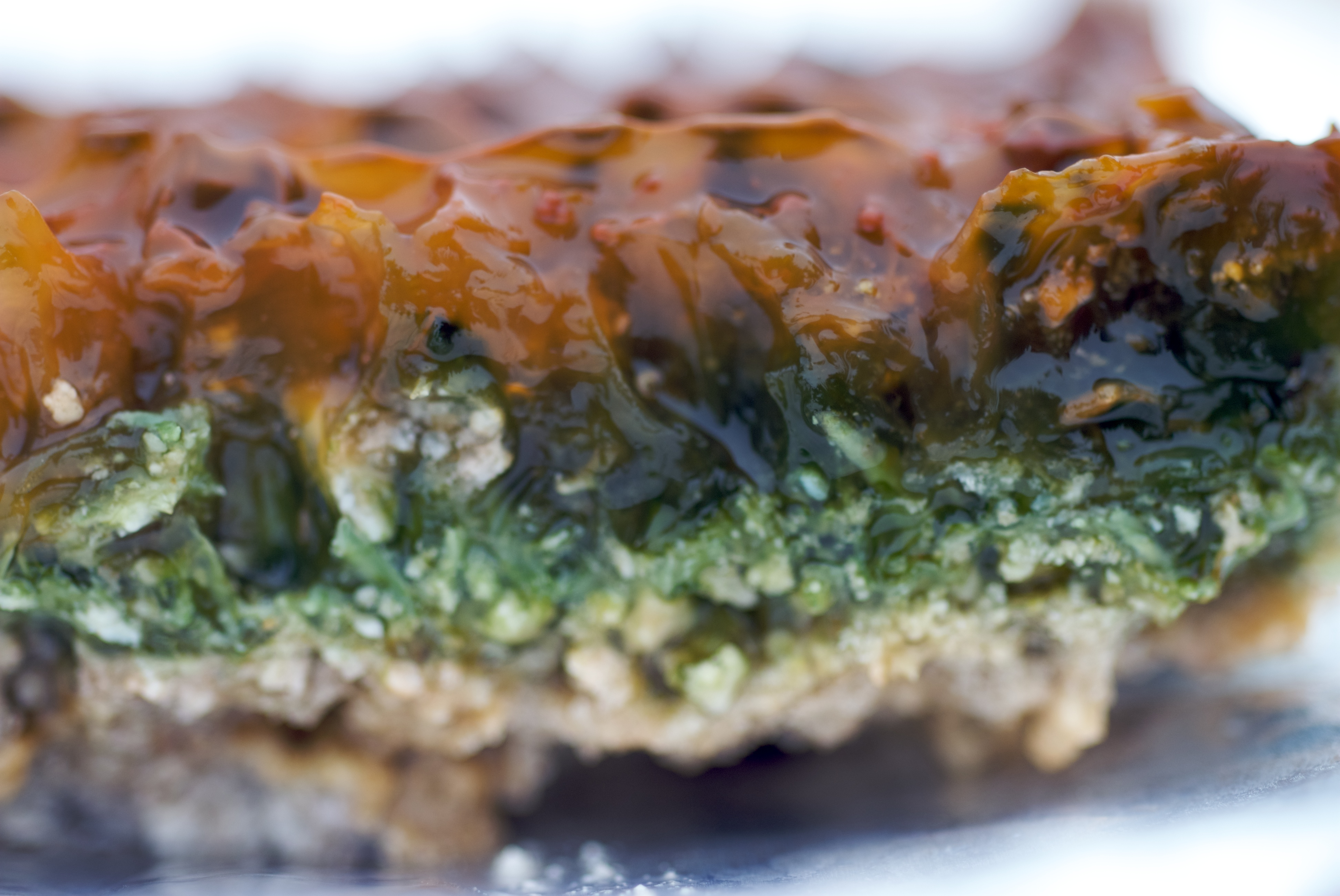
A vertical cross section of a microbial mat containing different organisms that perform different metabolisms. The green are presumably cyanobacteria, and teepee-like microstructures are visible on the surface.

Geomicrobiology traditionally studies the interactions between microbes and minerals. While it is generally reliant on the tools of microbiology, microbial geochemistry uses geological and chemical methods to approach the same topic from the perspective of the rocks. Geomicrobiology and microbial geochemistry (GMG) is a relatively new interdisciplinary field that more broadly takes on the relationship between microbes, Earth, and environmental systems. Billed as a subset of both geobiology and geochemistry, GMG seeks to understand elemental biogeochemical cycles and the evolution of life on Earth. Specifically, it asks questions about where microbes live, their local and global abundance, their structural and functional biochemistry, how they have evolved, biomineralization, and their preservation potential and presence in the rock record. In many ways, GMG appears to be equivalent to geobiology, but differs in scope: geobiology focuses on the role of all life, while GMG is strictly microbial. Regardless, it is these tiniest creatures that dominated to history of life integrated over time and seem to have had the most far-reaching effects.

=== Molecular geomicrobiology ===
Molecular geomicrobiology takes a mechanistic approach to understanding biological processes that are geologically relevant. It can be at the level of DNA, protein, lipids, or any metabolite. One example of Molecular geomicrobiology research is studying how recently created lava fields are colonized by microbes. The University of Helsinki is currently conducting research to determine what specific microbial traits are necessary for successful initial colonization, and how waves of microbial succession can transform the volcanic rock into fertile soil.

=== Organic geochemistry ===
Organic geochemistry is the study of organic molecules that appear in the fossil record in sedimentary rocks. Research in this field concerns molecular fossils that are often lipid biomarkers. Molecules like sterols and hopanoids, membrane lipids found in eukaryotes and bacteria, respectively, can be preserved in the rock record on billion-year timescales. Following the death of the organism they came from and sedimentation, they undergo a process called diagenesis whereby many of the specific functional groups from the lipids are lost, but the hydrocarbon skeleton remains intact. These fossilized lipids are called steranes and hopanes, respectively. There are also other types of molecular fossils, like porphyrins, the discovery of which in petroleum by Alfred E. Treibs actually led to the invention of the field. Other aspects of geochemistry that are also pertinent to geobiology include isotope geochemistry, in which scientists search for isotope fractionation in the rock record, and the chemical analysis of biominerals, such as magnetite or microbially-precipitated gold.

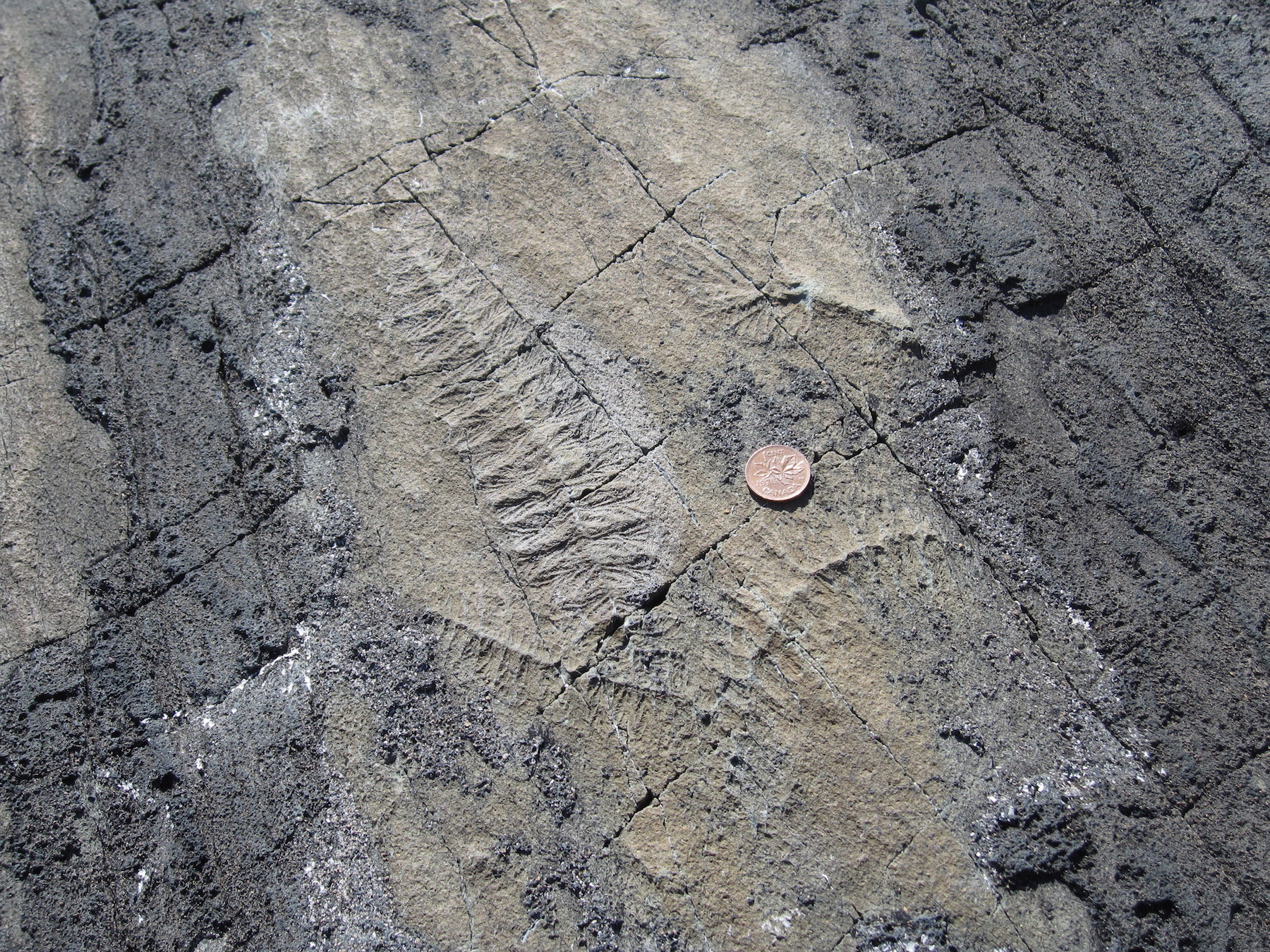
Ediacaran fossils from Mistaken Point, Newfoundland. Ediacaran biota originated during the Ediacaran Period and are unlike most animals around today.

=== Paleontology ===
Perhaps the oldest of the bunch, paleontology is the study of fossils. It involves the discovery, excavation, dating, and paleoecological understanding of any type of fossil, microbial or dinosaur, trace or body fossil. Micropaleontology is particularly relevant to geobiology. Putative bacterial microfossils and ancient stromatolites are used as evidence for the rise of metabolisms such as oxygenic photosynthesis. The search for molecular fossils, such as lipid biomarkers like steranes and hopanes, has also played an important role in geobiology and organic geochemistry. Relevant sub-disciples include paleoecology and paleobiogeoraphy.

=== Biogeography ===
Biogeography is the study of the geographic distribution of life through time. It can look at the present distribution of organisms across continents or between microniches, or the distribution of organisms through time, or in the past, which is called paleobiogeography.

=== Evolutionary biology ===
Evolutionary biology is the study of the evolutionary processes that have shaped the diversity of life on Earth. It incorporates genetics, ecology, biogeography, and paleontology to analyze topics including natural selection, variance, adaptation, divergence, genetic drift, and speciation.

=== Ecohydrology ===
Ecohydrology is an interdisciplinary field studying the interactions between water and ecosystems. Stable isotopes of water are sometimes used as tracers of water sources and flow paths between the physical environment and the biosphere.

== See also ==
- Biogeochemistry
- Biogeography
- Biogeology
- Ecology
- Fossil
- Geologic time scale
- Geomicrobiology
- Invertebrate paleontology
- Micropaleontology
- Paleobiology
- Paleobotany
- Paleontology
- Vertebrate paleontology
