= Lourens Baas Becking =

Dutch botanist and microbiologist (1894–1963)

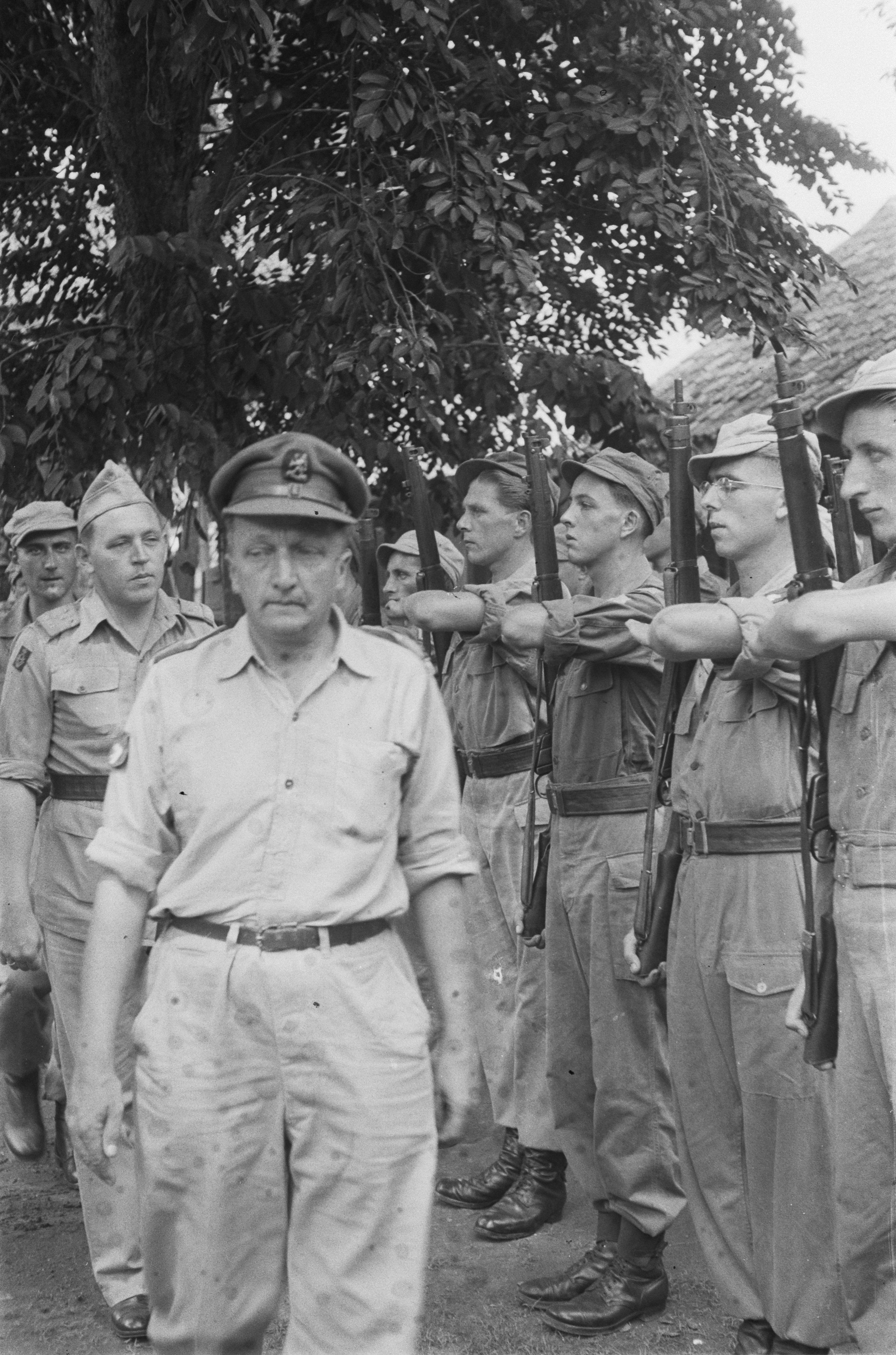
Baas Becking (1946)

Lourens Gerhard Marinus Baas Becking (4 January 1895 in Deventer – 6 January 1963 in Canberra, Australia) was a Dutch botanist and microbiologist. He is known for the Baas Becking hypothesis, which he originally formulated as "Everything is everywhere, but the environment selects".

== Biography ==
Baas Becking was born in Deventer on 4 January 1895. Baas Becking studied microbiology at Delft University before studying biology at Utrecht University with a focus on botany. In between completing his studies in Utrecht and submitting his thesis, Baas Becking worked in the laboratory of Thomas Hunt Morgan in the United States. In 1923, Baas Becking accepted the position of professor at Stanford, where he taught economic botany and plant physiology.

Baas Becking's studies at Stanford heavily influenced his later work by introducing him to research on extremophiles, research he conducted himself as the director of the Jacques Loeb Marine Laboratory in Pacific Grove. In particular, Baas Becking studied the salt lakes and methane-rich reservoirs in California.

Baas Becking returned to the Netherlands in 1930 as a professor of general botany at the University of Leiden and prefect (director) of the Hortus Botanicus Leiden. It was in Leiden that Baas Becking formulated the hypothesis known by his name. In 1934 he published the book Geobiology after a series of lectures in Pulchri Studio in The Hague. While in Leiden in 1940, he was appointed Director of the state-financed Botanical Garden of Buitenzorg in present-day Bogor, on the island of Java, with the intention of restoring the garden to its former glory. Under his leadership, a new botanic garden branch for dry-tropical plants was opened in the town of Purwodadi in 1941.

Although his family moved to Java in 1940, the Battle of the Netherlands prevented his leaving, and he remained in the Netherlands during the five-year occupation. During this time, he was twice imprisoned for trying to escape to England. During his imprisonment, Baas Becking studied the typhoid fever spreading through his prison camp.

After World War II, Baas Becking was initially prevented from beginning his work in Bogor due to the Indonesian Revolution. Until November 1946 he was head, with the rank of colonel, of the mobile units of the Red Cross. He moved to New Caledonia in 1948, after being appointed president of the scientific council of the South Pacific Commission.

Baas Becking later worked for the Commonwealth Scientific and Industrial Research Organisation in Cronulla and Canberra. The Bureau of Mineral Resources in Canberra recognized Baas Becking's contributions by opening the Baas Becking Geobiological Laboratory.

Baas Becking became member of the Royal Netherlands Academy of Arts and Sciences in 1932 and resigned in 1942. In 1945 he once again became member, in 1949 he became foreign member.

== Baas Becking hypothesis ==
Based on his research in California's salt lakes, as well as work by others on salt lakes worldwide, Baas Becking (1934) concluded, "Everything is everywhere, but the environment selects". Baas Becking attributed the first half of this hypothesis to his colleague Martinus Beijerinck (1913). Some years before, Schewiakoff (1893) also theorized about the cosmopolitan habitat of free-living protozoans.

The application of this hypothesis to microorganisms, specifically to the dependence of their geographic distribution over the earth on their metabolic properties, formed the basis of Baas Becking's research program at the Hortus Botanicus Leiden.

Baas Becking presented a series of lectures on the subject to the Diligentia in The Hague, which he published as a book titled Geobiology in 1934.

Baas Becking's hypothesis is often misquoted, with the "but" missing or replaced with "and".
