= Beck Spring Dolomite =

Geological formation in California, USA

The Beck Spring Dolomite is a geological formation in Death Valley, California, from the Tonian period of the Neoproterozoic era. It is believed to be between 750 and 800 million years old. It is known for its highly palaeontologically significant fossils of microbial life. It consists almost entirely of dolomite.

There are three layers of dolomite found there. The topmost part is laminae of pelletal and mosaic dolomite. The next is oolitic of mosaic dolomite with oolite, pisolite, and grapestone. The lowest layer is upper cherty stromatolites that has been partially silicified and dolomitized.

== Palaeontological significance ==
Paul Knauth, a geologist at Arizona State University, maintains that photosynthesizing organisms such as algae may have grown in the Beck Spring Dolomite. Samples were taken in the 1990s revealed that the region housed flourishing mats of photosynthesizing, unicellular life forms which antedated the Cambrian explosion.

Microfossils have been found in holes in the surface of the dolomite. These microfossil and geochemical findings support the idea that during the Precambrian period, complex life evolved both in the oceans and on land. Knauth contends that due to the high levels of salt and low levels of oxygen in the ocean at that time, the animals may have had their origin in freshwater lakes and streams.

Since the original discovery, studies have documented plenty of microfossil and geochemical evidence showing that life covered the continents as far back as 2.2 billion years ago. While most paleobiologists now accept the idea that simple life forms existed on land during the Precambrian, few accept that multicellular life thrived on land more than 600 million years ago.
