= Geobiology (journal) =

- Discipline: Geobiology
- Language: English
- Edited by: Kurt Konhauser

Publication details
- History: 2003–present
- Publisher: Wiley-Blackwell
- Frequency: Bimonthly
- Impact factor: 4.385 (2019)

Standard abbreviations
- ISO 4: Geobiology

Indexing
- CODEN: GEOBCZ
- ISSN: 1472-4677 (print); 1472-4669 (web)
- LCCN: 2003201710
- OCLC no.: 52805553

Links
- Journal homepage; Online access; Online archive

Geobiology is a peer-reviewed scientific journal of geobiology published by Wiley-Blackwell. It was established in 2003 as both a print and online journal, with five issues per year. In 2011, the journal became online-only, and increased publication to six times per year. The editor-in-chief is Kurt Konhauser (University of Alberta).

== Abstracting and indexing ==
The journal is indexed and abstracted in:

- Academic Search
- AGRICOLA
- Agricultural Engineering Abstracts
- Aquatic Sciences & Fisheries Abstracts
- Biological Abstracts
- BIOSIS Previews
- CAB Abstracts
- CABDirect
- Chemical Abstracts Service
- Celdes SRL
- Crop Physiology Abstracts
- CSA Environmental Sciences & Pollution Management Database
- CSA Sustainability Science Abstracts
- Current Contents/Agriculture, Biology & Environmental Sciences
- Current Contents/Physical, Chemical & Earth Sciences
- Field Crop Abstracts
- Forestry Abstracts
- Grasslands & Forage Abstracts
- Helminthological Abstracts
- InfoTrac
- Irrigation & Drainage Abstracts
- MEDLINE
- Meteorological & Geoastrophysical Abstracts
- Plant Breeding Abstracts
- Plant Genetic Resources Abstracts
- Review of Medical & Veterinary Entomology
- Rice Abstracts
- Science Citation Index
- Soils & Fertilizer Abstracts
- The Zoological Record

According to the Journal Citation Reports, the journal has a 2011 impact factor of 4.111, ranking it 6th out of 170 journals in the category "Geosciences, Multidisciplinary", 11th out of 84 journals in the category "Biology", and 19th out of 205 journals in the category "Environmental Sciences".
