= Mount Sharp =

Martian mountain

Aeolis Mons
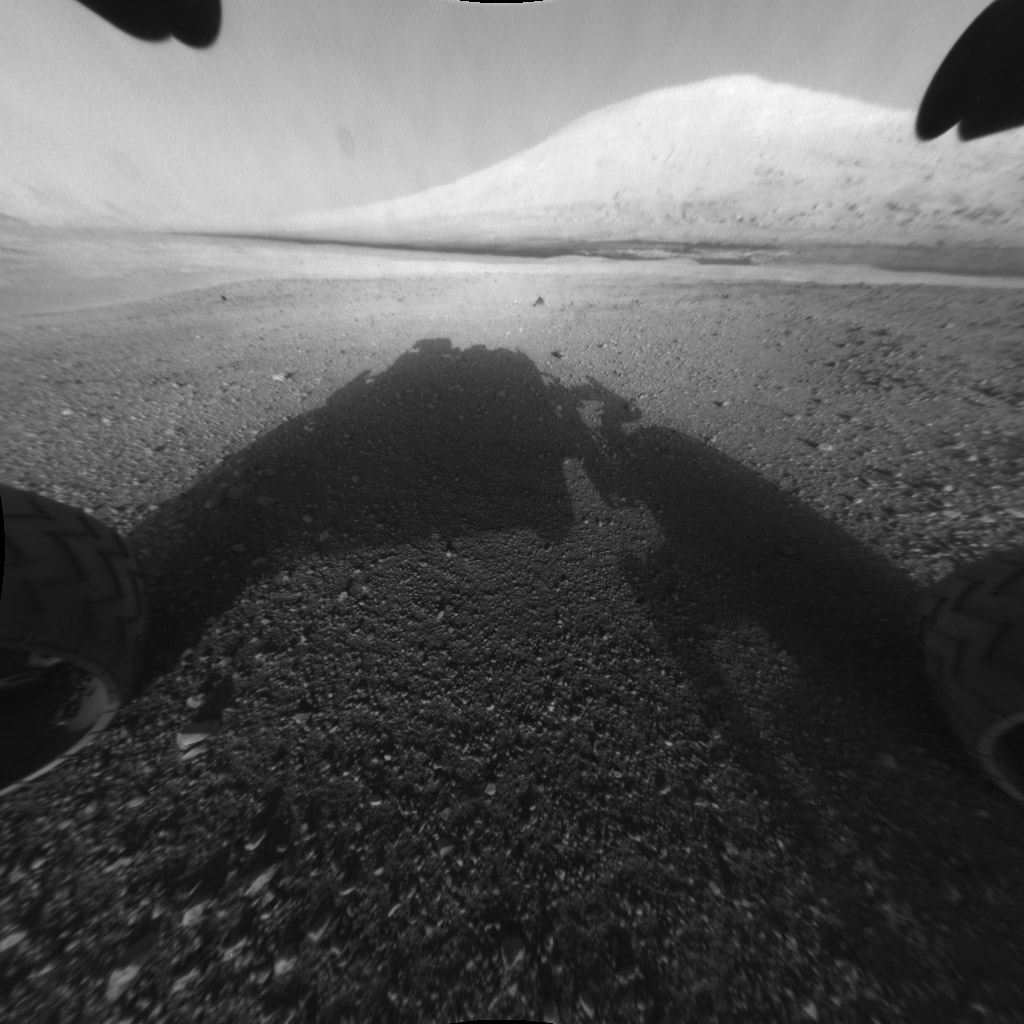
- The rover Curiosity landed on August 6, 2012, near the base of Aeolis Mons.
- Location: Gale crater on Mars
- Coordinates: 5.08°S 137.85°E
- Peak: Aeolis Mons – 5.5 km (3.4 mi) 18,045 ft (5,500 m)
- Discoverer: NASA in the 1970s
- Eponym: Aeolis Mons – Aeolis albedo feature Mount Sharp – Robert P. Sharp (1911–2004)

Mount Sharp, officially Aeolis Mons (/ˈiːəlɪs mɒnz/), is a mountain on Mars. It forms the central peak within Gale crater and is located around 5.08°S 137.85°E, rising 5.5 km (18,000 ft) high from the valley floor. Its ID in the United States Geological Survey's Gazetteer of Planetary Nomenclature is 15000.

On August 6, 2012, Curiosity (the Mars Science Laboratory rover) landed in "Yellowknife" Quad 51 of Aeolis Palus, next to the mountain. NASA named the landing site Bradbury Landing on August 22, 2012. Aeolis Mons is a primary goal for scientific study. On June 5, 2013, NASA announced that Curiosity would begin an 8 km (5.0 mi) journey from the Glenelg area to the base of Aeolis Mons. On November 13, 2013, NASA announced that an entryway the rover would traverse on its way to Aeolis Mons was to be named "Murray Buttes", in honor of planetary scientist Bruce C. Murray (1931–2013). The trip was expected to take about a year and would include stops along the way to study the local terrain.

On September 11, 2014, NASA announced that Curiosity had reached Aeolis Mons, the rover mission's long-term prime destination. Possible recurrent slope lineae, wet brine flows, were reported on Mount Sharp near Curiosity in 2015. In June 2017, NASA reported that an ancient striated lake had existed in Gale crater that could have been favorable for microbial life.

== Formation ==
The mountain appears to be an enormous mound of eroded sedimentary layers sitting on the central peak of Gale. It rises 5.5 km (18,000 ft) above the northern crater floor and 4.5 km (15,000 ft) above the southern crater floor, higher than the southern crater rim. The sediments may have been laid down over an interval of 2 billion years, and may have once completely filled the crater. Some of the lower sediment layers may have originally been deposited on a lake bed, while observations of possibly cross-bedded strata in the upper mound suggest aeolian processes. However, this issue is debated, and the origin of the lower layers remains unclear. If katabatic wind deposition played the predominant role in the emplacement of the sediments, as suggested by reported 3 degree radial slopes of the mound's layers, erosion would have come into play largely to place an upper limit on the mound's growth.

On December 8, 2014, a panel of NASA scientists discussed (archive 62:03) the latest observations of Curiosity about how water may have helped shape the landscape of Mars, including Aeolis Mons, and had a climate long ago that could have produced long-lasting lakes at many Martian locations.

On October 8, 2015, NASA confirmed that lakes and streams existed in Gale crater 3.3 - 3.8 billion years ago delivering sediments to build up the lower layers of Mount Sharp.

On February 1, 2019, NASA scientists reported that Curiosity had determined, for the first time, the density of Mount Sharp in Gale crater, thereby establishing a clearer understanding of how the mountain was formed.

== Size comparisons ==
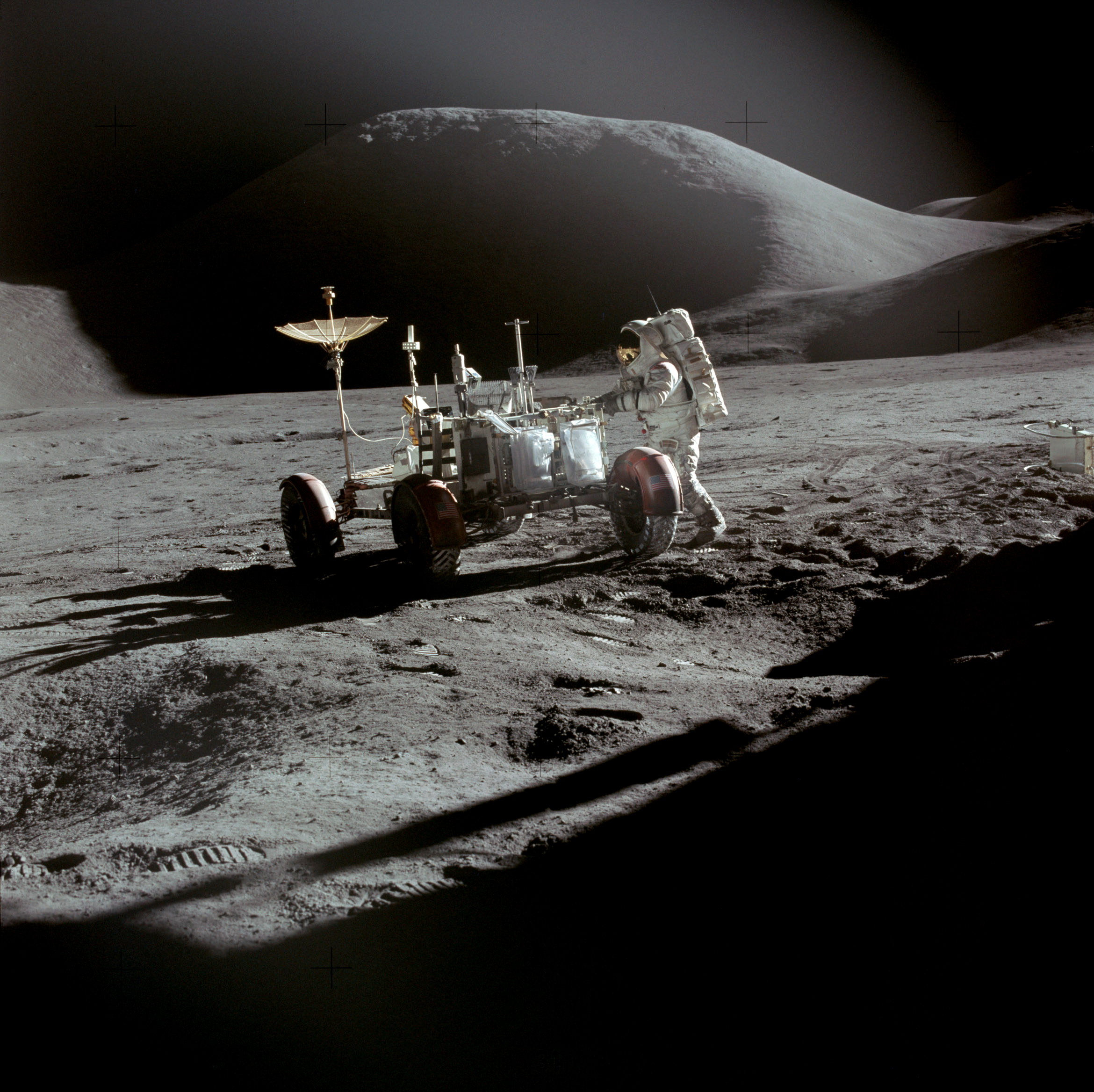
Mons Hadley, on the Moon, is 4.5 km (15,000 ft) high. Here it is being visited by the Apollo 15 Lunar Roving Vehicle.

Mountain	km high
Aeolis	5.5
Huygens	5.5
Denali	5.5 (btp)
Blanc	4.8 (asl)
Uhuru	4.6 (btp)
Fuji	3.8 (asl)
Zugspitze	3

Aeolis Mons is 5.5 km (18,000 ft) high, about the same height as Mons Huygens, and taller than Mons Hadley visited by Apollo 15. The tallest mountain known in the Solar System is in Rheasilvia crater on the asteroid Vesta, which contains a central mound that rises 22 km (14 mi; 72,000 ft) high; Olympus Mons on Mars is nearly the same height, at 21.9 km (13.6 mi; 72,000 ft) high.

In comparison, Mount Everest rises to 8.8 km (29,000 ft) altitude above sea level (asl), but is only 4.6 km (15,000 ft) (base-to-peak) (btp). Africa's Mount Kilimanjaro is about 5.9 km (19,000 ft) altitude above sea level to the Uhuru peak; also 4.6 km base-to-peak. America's Denali, also known as Mount McKinley, has a base-to-peak of 5.5 km (18,000 ft). The Franco-Italian Mont Blanc/Monte Bianco is 4.8 km (16,000 ft) in altitude above sea level, Mount Fuji, which overlooks Tokyo, Japan, is about 3.8 km (12,000 ft) altitude. Compared to the Andes, Aeolis Mons would rank outside the hundred tallest peaks, being roughly the same height as Argentina's Cerro Pajonal; the peak is higher than any above sea level in Oceania, but base-to peak it is considerably shorter than Hawaii's Mauna Kea and its neighbors.

== Name ==
Discovered in the 1970s, the mountain remained unnamed for several decades. When Gale crater became a candidate landing site, the mountain was given various labels e.g. in 2010 a NASA photo caption called it "Gale crater mound". In March 2012, NASA unofficially named it "Mount Sharp", after American geologist Robert P. Sharp.

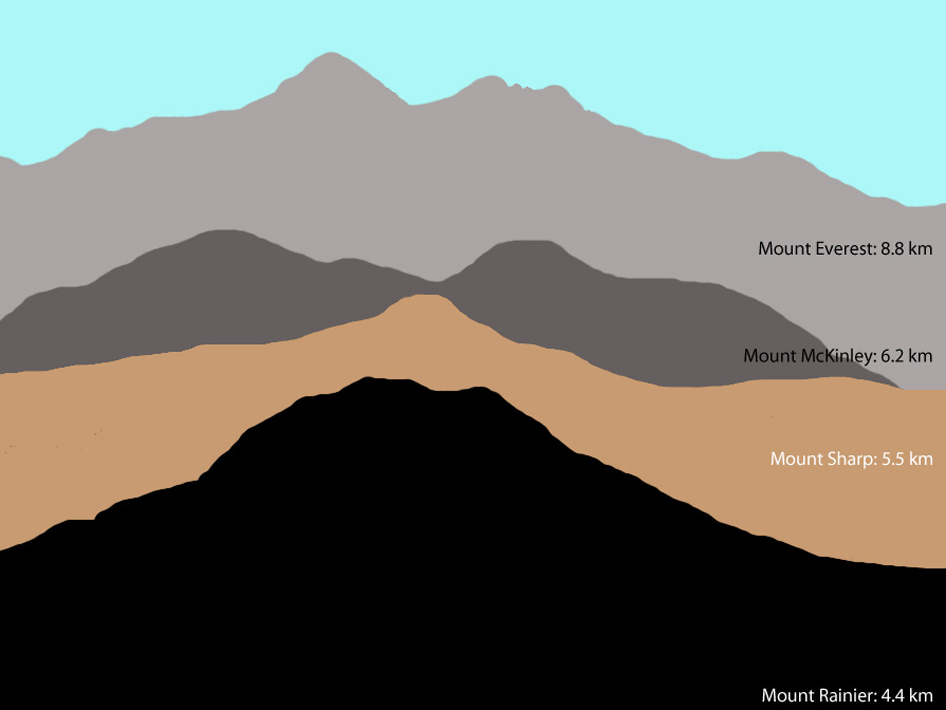
Comparison of Mount Sharp (Aeolis Mons) to the sizes of three large mountains on Earth.

Since 1919 the International Astronomical Union (IAU) has been the official body responsible for planetary nomenclature. Under its long-established rules for naming features on Mars, mountains are named after the classical albedo feature in which they are located, not after people. In May 2012 the IAU officially named the mountain Aeolis Mons after the Aeolis albedo feature. It also gave the name Aeolis Palus to the plain located on the crater floor between the northern wall of Gale and the northern foothills of the mountain. The IAU's choice of name is supported by the United States Geological Survey. Martian craters are named after deceased scientists, so in recognition of NASA and Sharp, at the same time the IAU named "Robert Sharp", a large crater (150 km (93 mi) diameter) located about 260 km (160 mi) west of Gale.

NASA and the European Space Agency continue to refer to the mountain as "Mount Sharp" in press conferences and press releases. This is similar to their use of other informal names, such as the Columbia Hills near one of the Mars Exploration Rover landing sites.

In August 2012, the magazine Sky & Telescope ran an article explaining the rationale of the two names and held an informal poll to determine which one was preferred by their readers. Over 2700 people voted, with Aeolis Mons winning by 57% to Mount Sharp's 43%.

== Spacecraft exploration ==
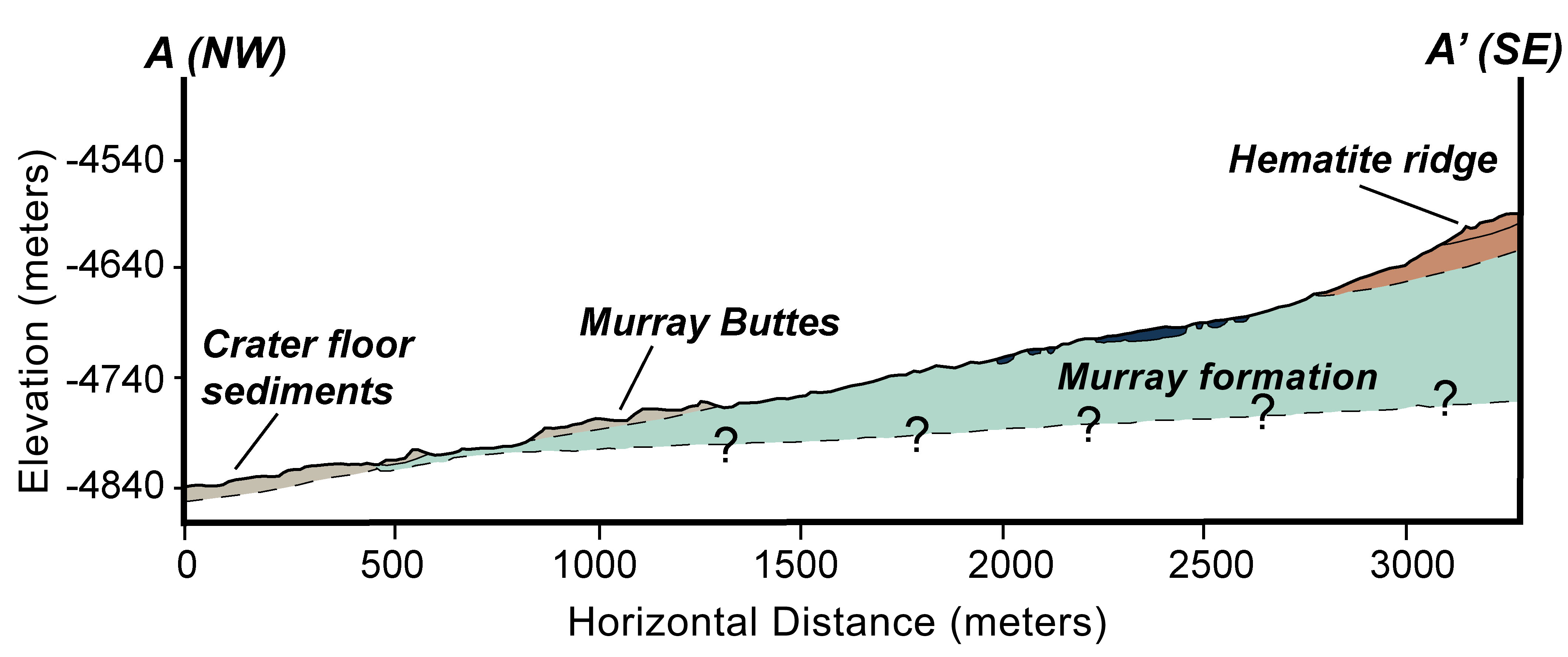
Geology map – from the crater floor in Aeolis Palus up the slopes of Aeolis Mons
(September 11, 2014).
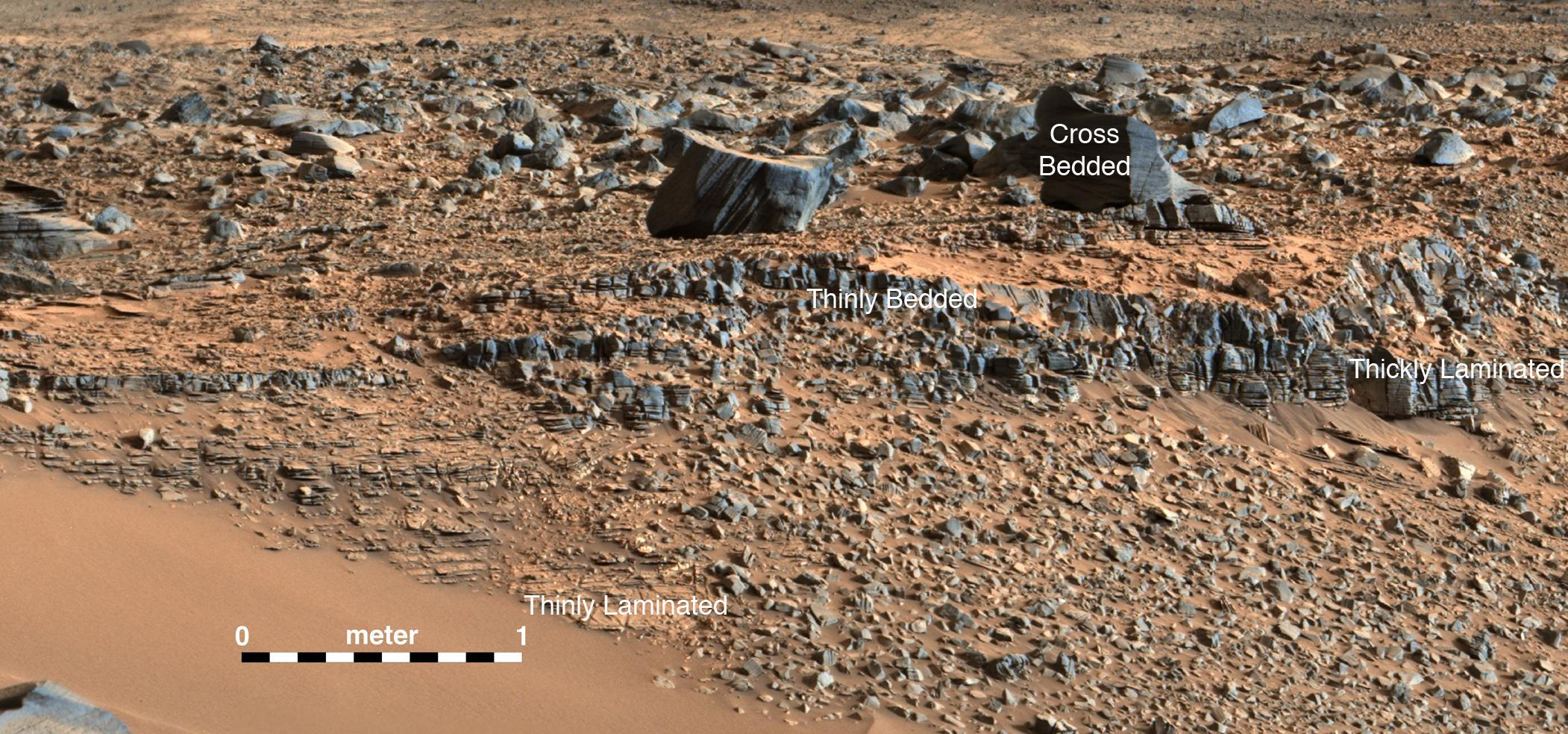
Rocks in "Hidden Valley" near the "Pahrump Hills" on the slopes of Aeolis Mons as viewed from Curiosity
(September 11, 2014; white balanced).

On December 16, 2014, NASA reported detecting, based on measurements by the Curiosity rover, an unusual increase, then decrease, in the amounts of methane in the atmosphere of the planet Mars; as well as, detecting Martian organic chemicals in powder drilled from a rock by the rover. Also, based on deuterium to hydrogen ratio studies, much of the water at Gale Crater on Mars was found to have been lost during ancient times, before the lakebed in the crater was formed; afterwards, large amounts of water continued to be lost.

On June 1, 2017, NASA reported that the Curiosity rover provided evidence of an ancient lake in Gale crater on Mars that could have been favorable for microbial life; the ancient lake was stratified, with shallows rich in oxidants and depths poor in oxidants; and, the ancient lake provided many different types of microbe-friendly environments at the same time. NASA further reported that the Curiosity rover will continue to explore higher and younger layers of Mount Sharp in order to determine how the lake environment in ancient times on Mars became the drier environment in more modern times.

On August 5, 2017, NASA celebrated the fifth anniversary of the Curiosity landing, and related exploratory accomplishments, on the planet Mars. (Videos: Curiosity's First Five Years (02:07); Curiosity's POV: Five Years Driving (05:49); Curiosity's Discoveries About Gale Crater (02:54))

On April 11, 2019, NASA announced that Curiosity had drilled into, and closely studied, a "clay-bearing unit" which, according to the rover Project Manager, is a "major milestone" in Curiosity's journey up Mount Sharp.

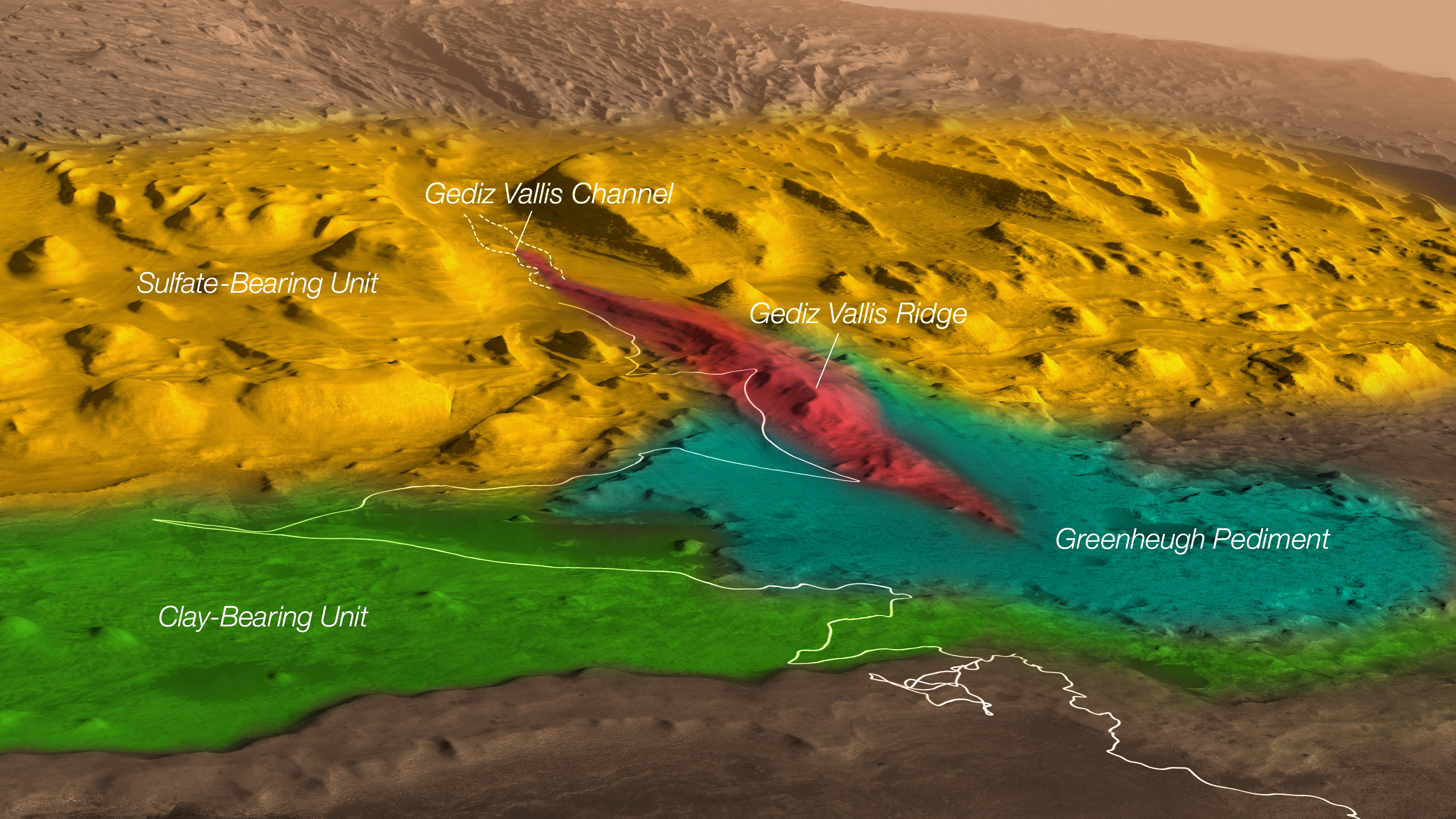
Mars Curiosity rover explores Mount Sharp (May 15, 2019)

In January 2023, Curiosity viewed and studied the "Cacao" meteorite.

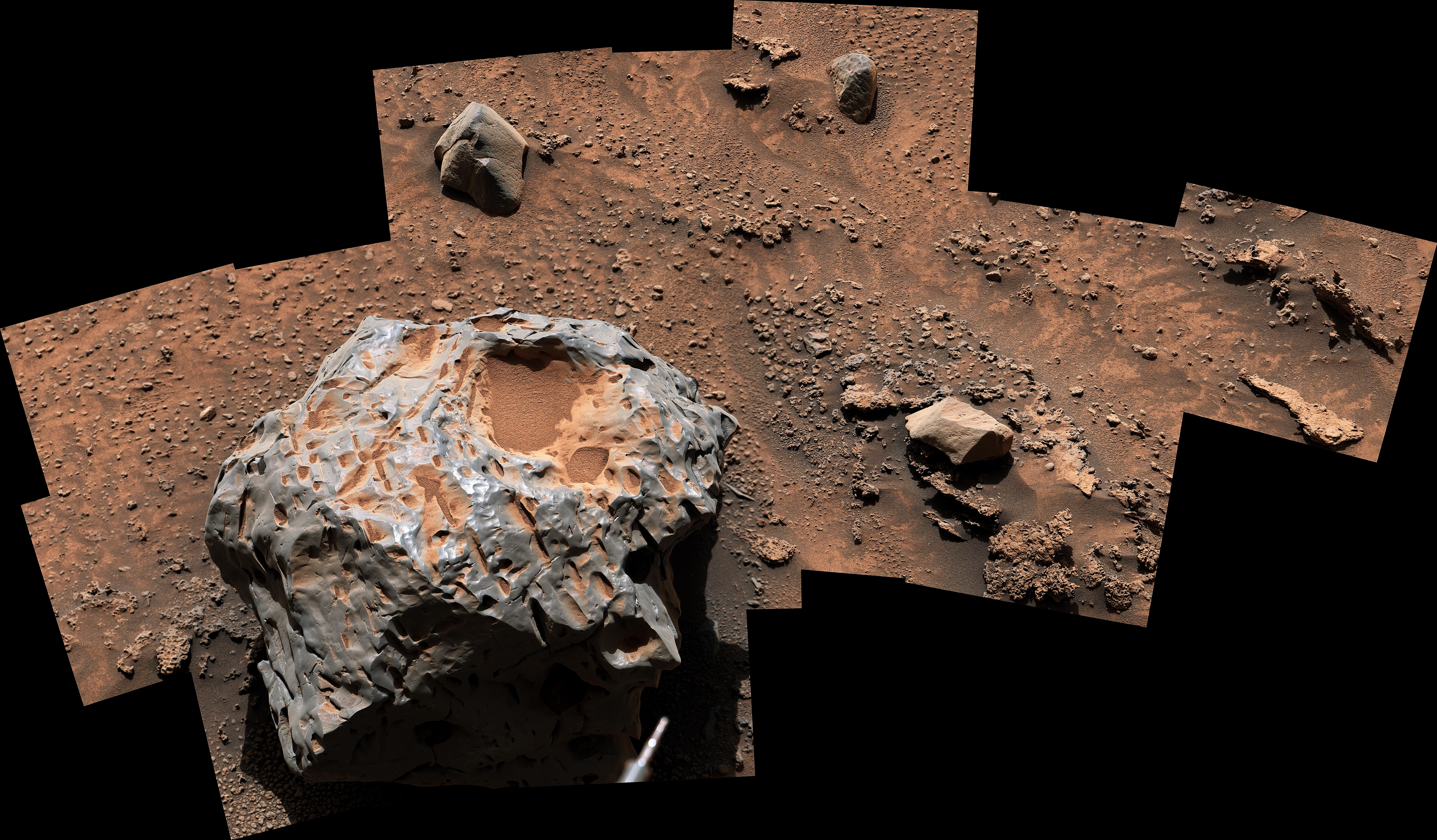
Curiosity views the "Cacao" meteorite (28 January 2023)

In August 2023, Curiosity explored the upper Gediz Vallis Ridge. A panoramic view of the ridge is here, and a 3D rendered view is here.

The path of Curiosity to Gediz Vallis Ridge and beyond (August 2023)

=== Curiosity mission ===
Curiosity at Mount Sharp
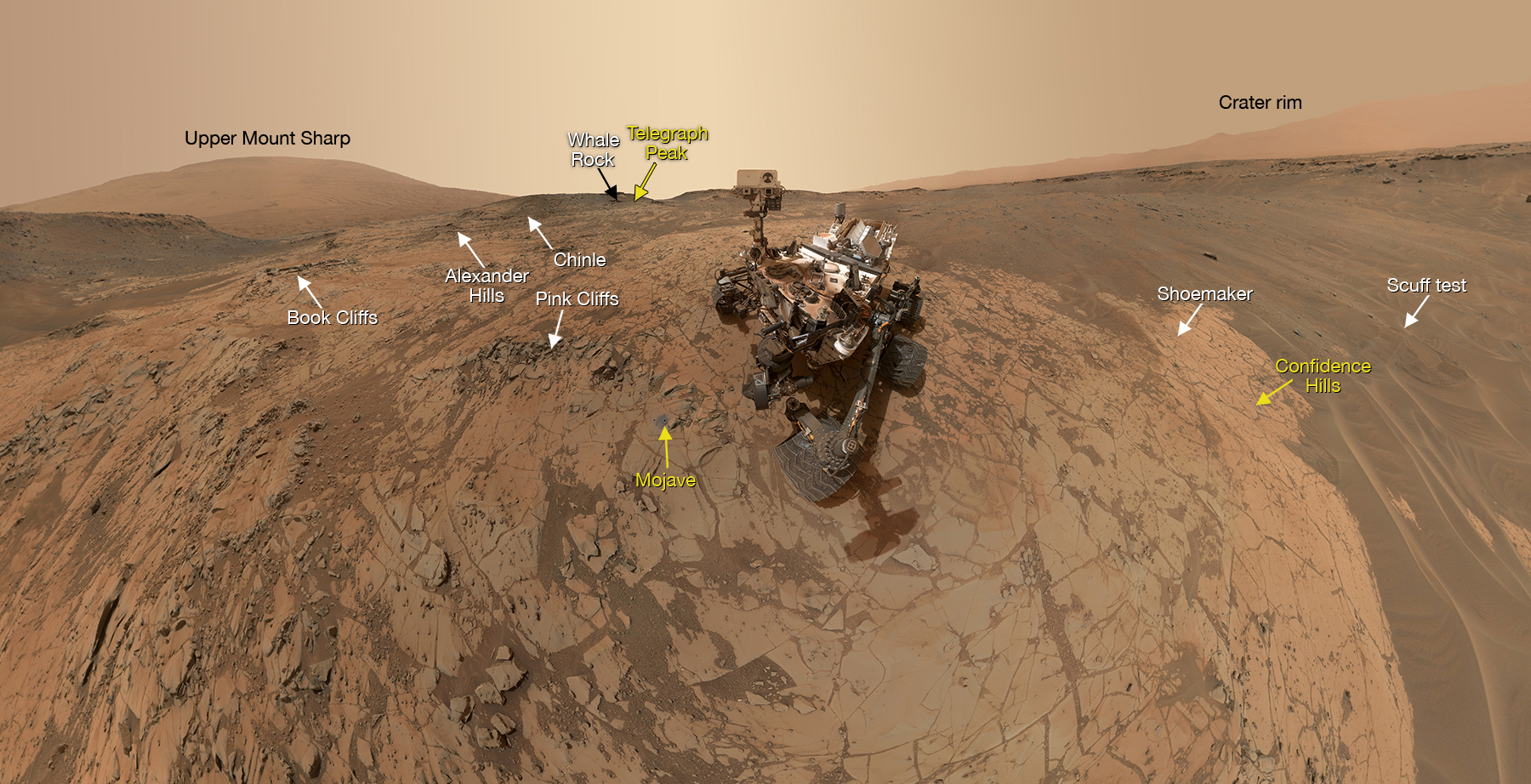
Self-portrait of Curiosity at the Mojave site (January 31, 2015).

As of November 15, 2026, Curiosity has been on the planet Mars for 5075 sols (5213 total days) since landing on August 6, 2012. Since September 11, 2014, Curiosity has been exploring the slopes of Mount Sharp, where more information about the history of Mars is expected to be found. As of January 26, 2021, the rover has traveled over 24.15 km (15.01 mi) and climbed over 327 m (1,073 ft) in elevation to, and around, the mountain base since landing at "Bradbury Landing" in August 2012.

Curiosity exploring the slopes of Mount Sharp.

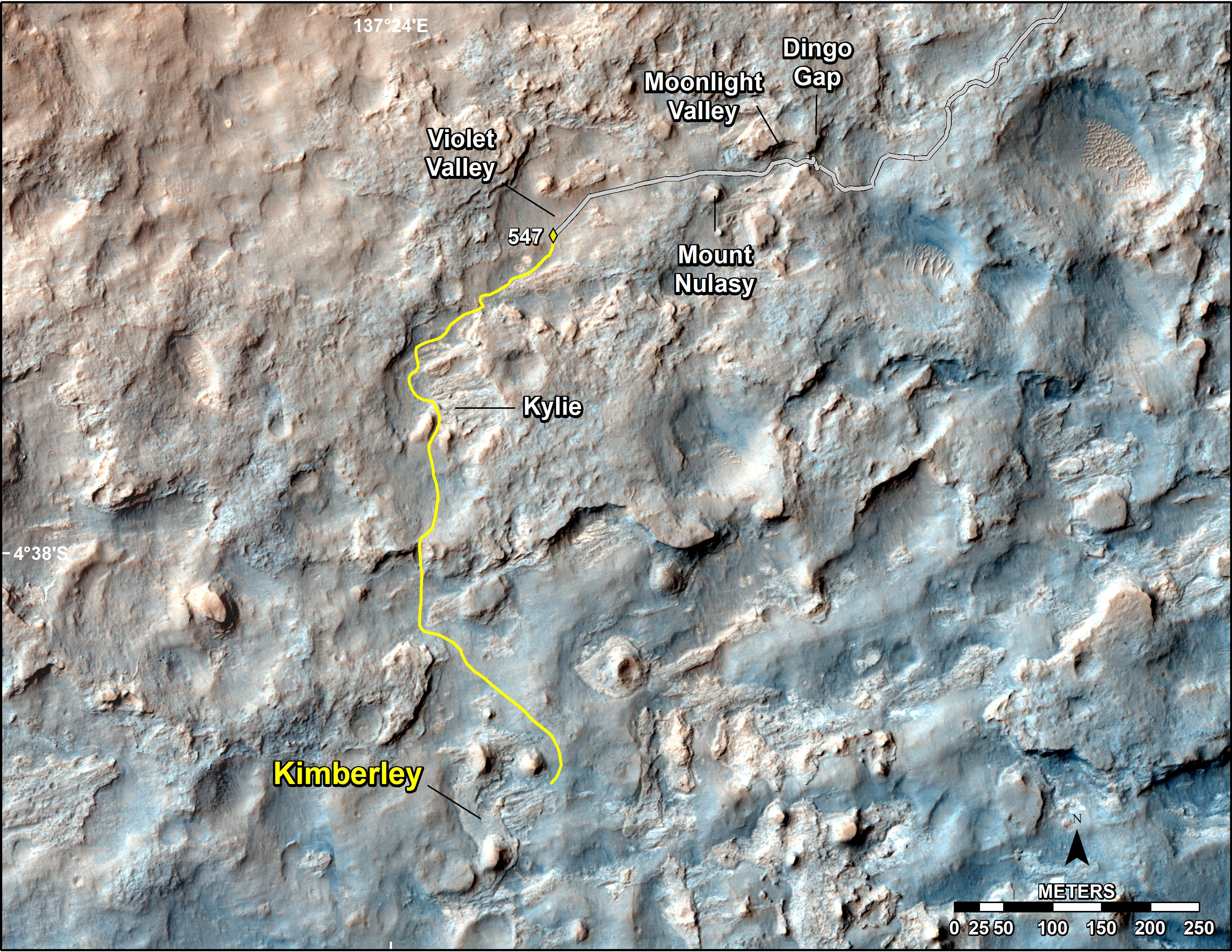
Close-up map - planned route from "Dingo Gap" to "Kimberley" (KMS-9) (HiRISE image)
(February 18, 2014/Sol 547).

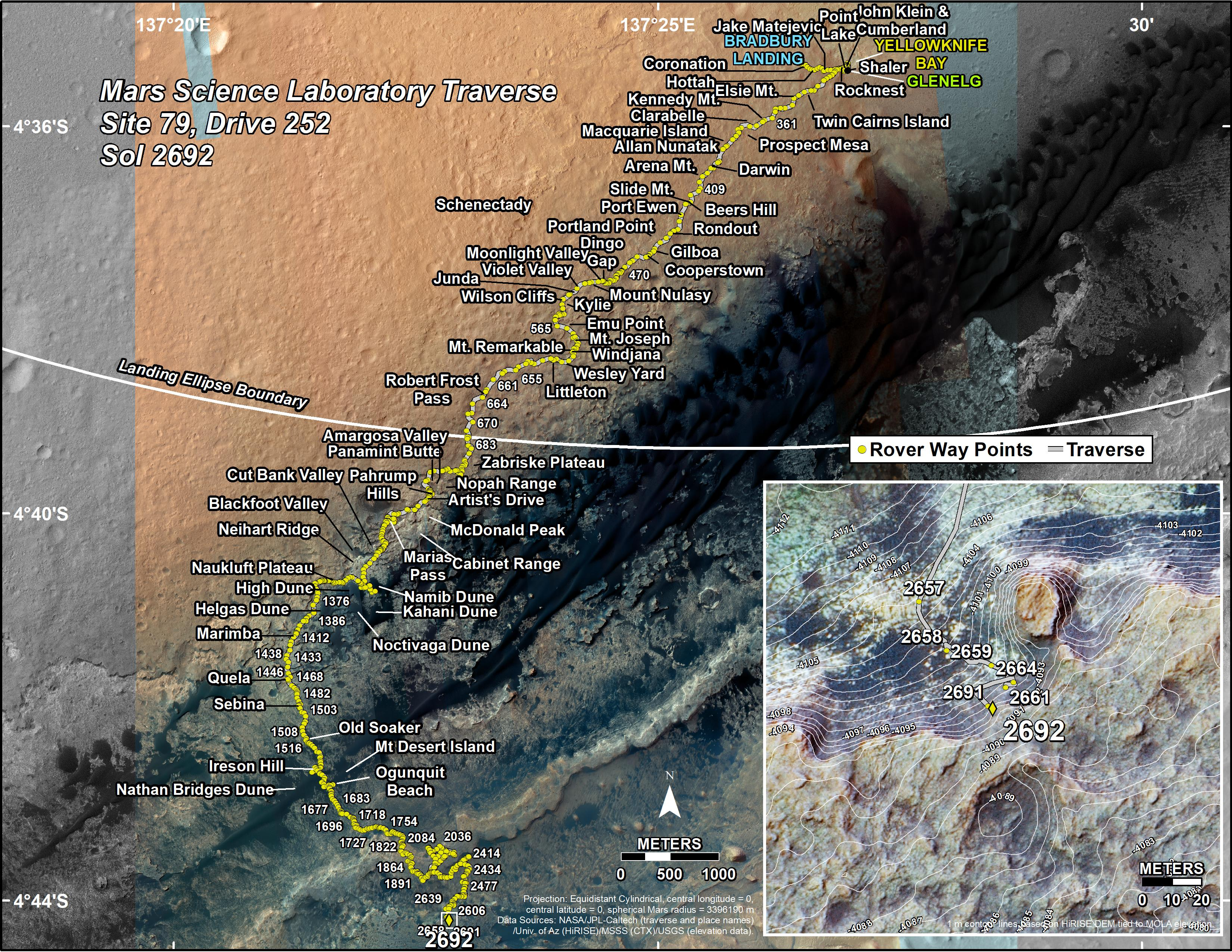
Traverse map - Curiosity has traveled over 21.92 km (13.62 mi) since leaving its "start" point in Yellowknife Bay on July 4, 2013 (now beyond the "3-sigma safe-to-land ellipse" border) (HiRISE image)
(March 3, 2020/Sol 2692).

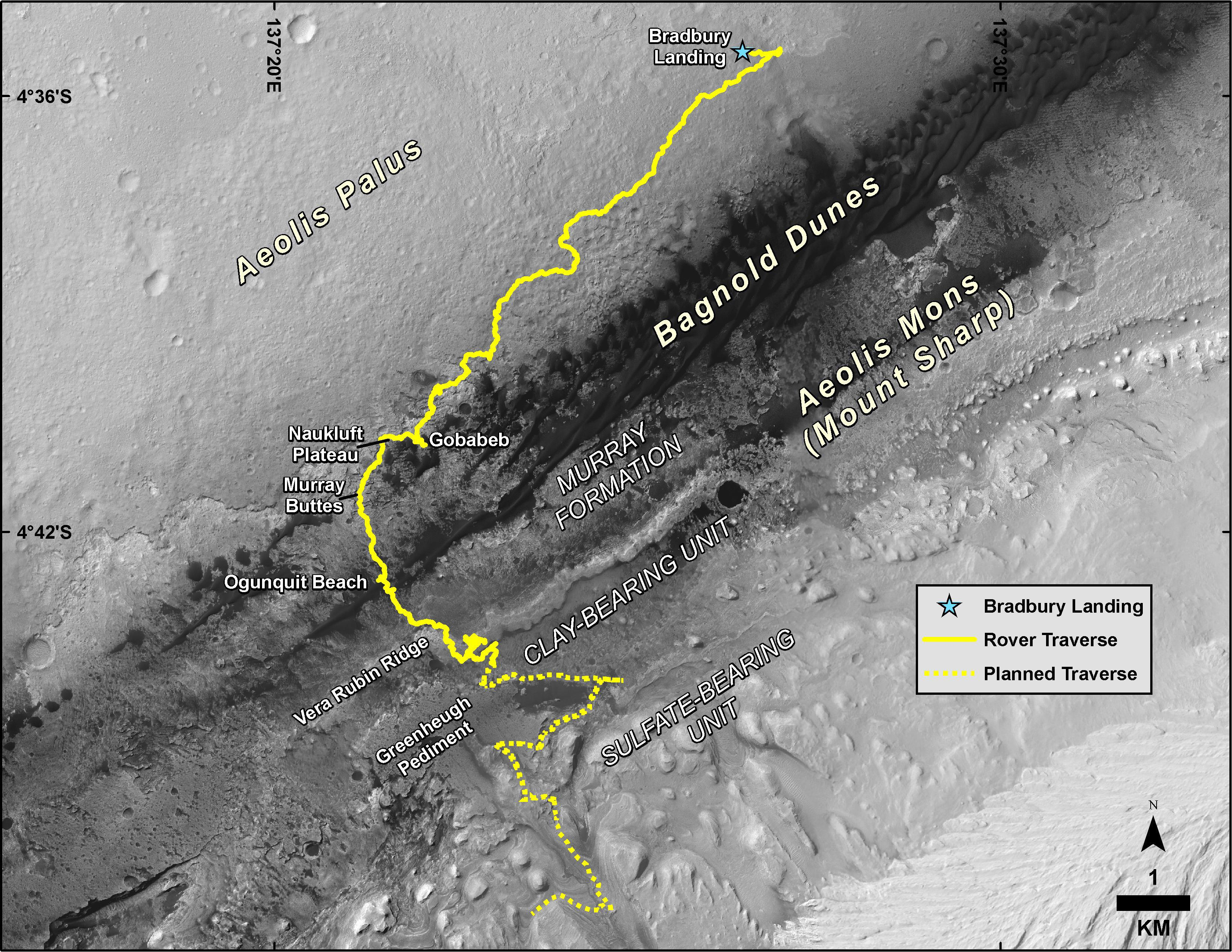
Context map - Curiosity's trip to Mount Sharp (star = landing)
(August 22, 2019/Sol 2504).

Credit: NASA/JPL-Caltech/University of Arizona

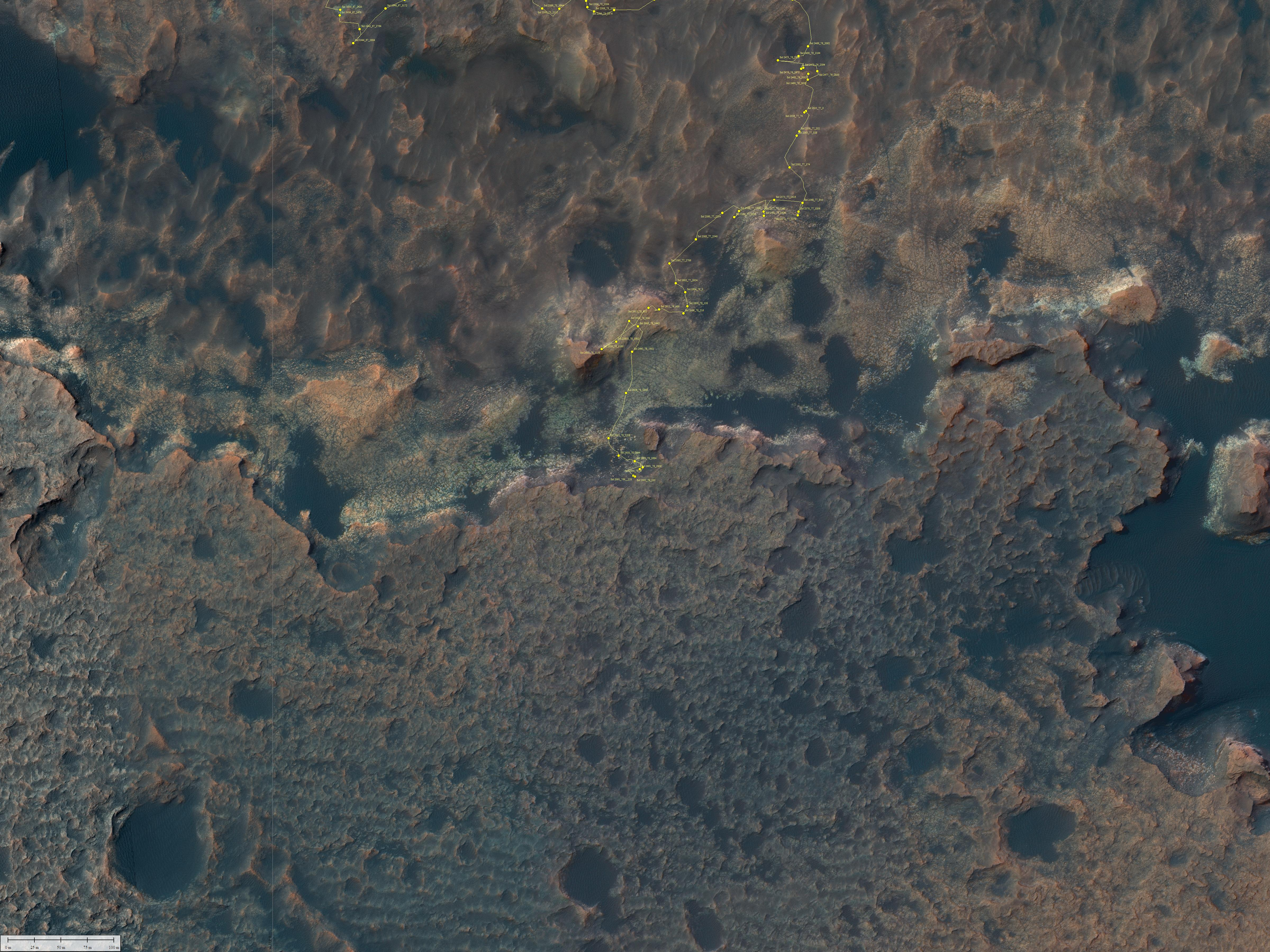
Location map - Curiosity rover at the base of Mount Sharp - as viewed from Space (MRO; HiRISE; March 3, 2020/Sol 2692).
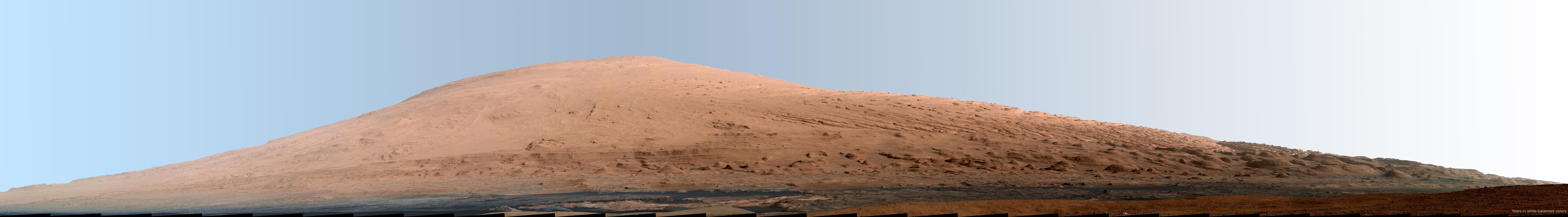
Curiosity's view of "Mount Sharp" (September 20, 2012; white balanced) (raw color).
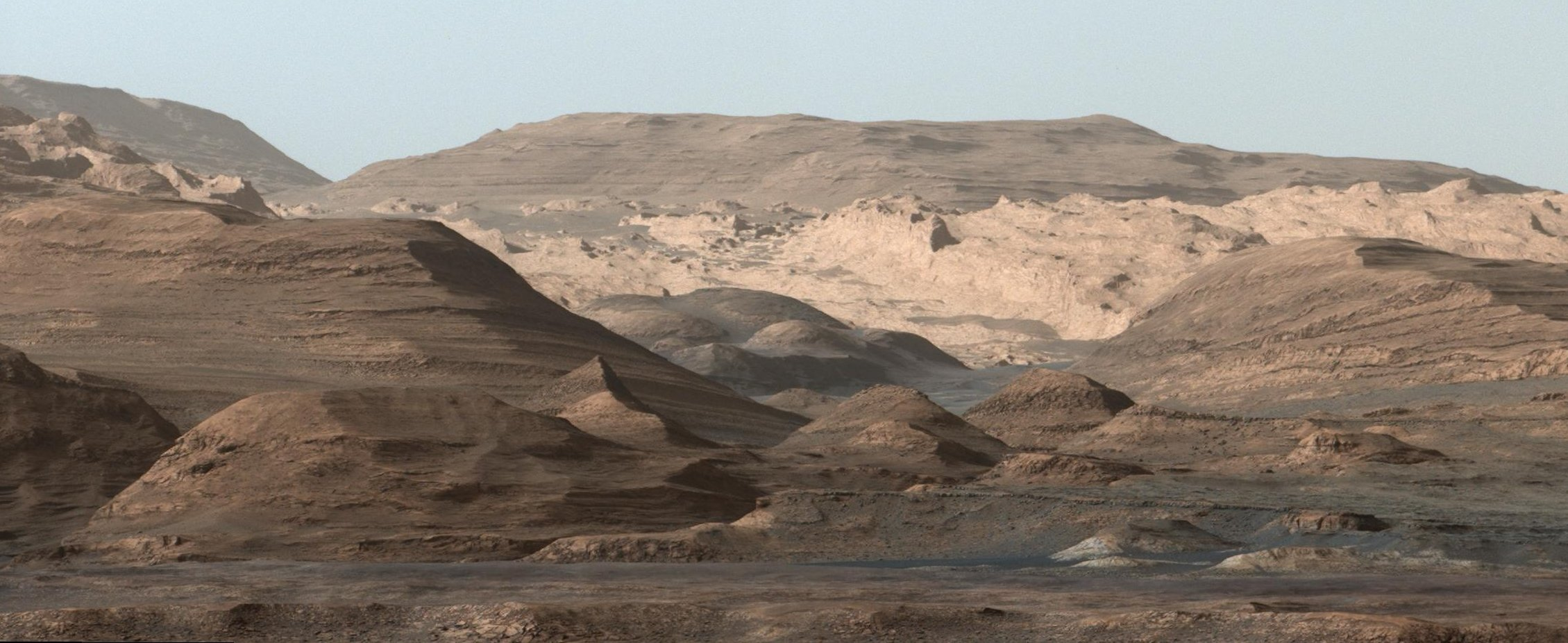
Curiosity's view of "Mount Sharp" (September 9, 2015).
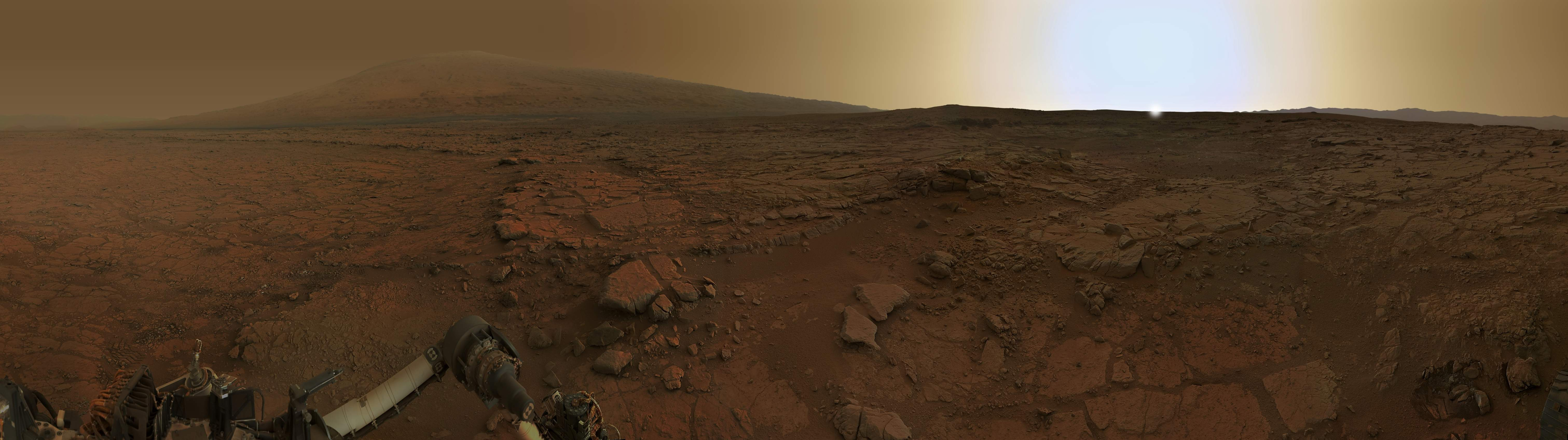
Curiosity's view of Mars sky at sunset (February 2013; Sun simulated by artist).

== Gallery ==
Mount Sharp - related Images
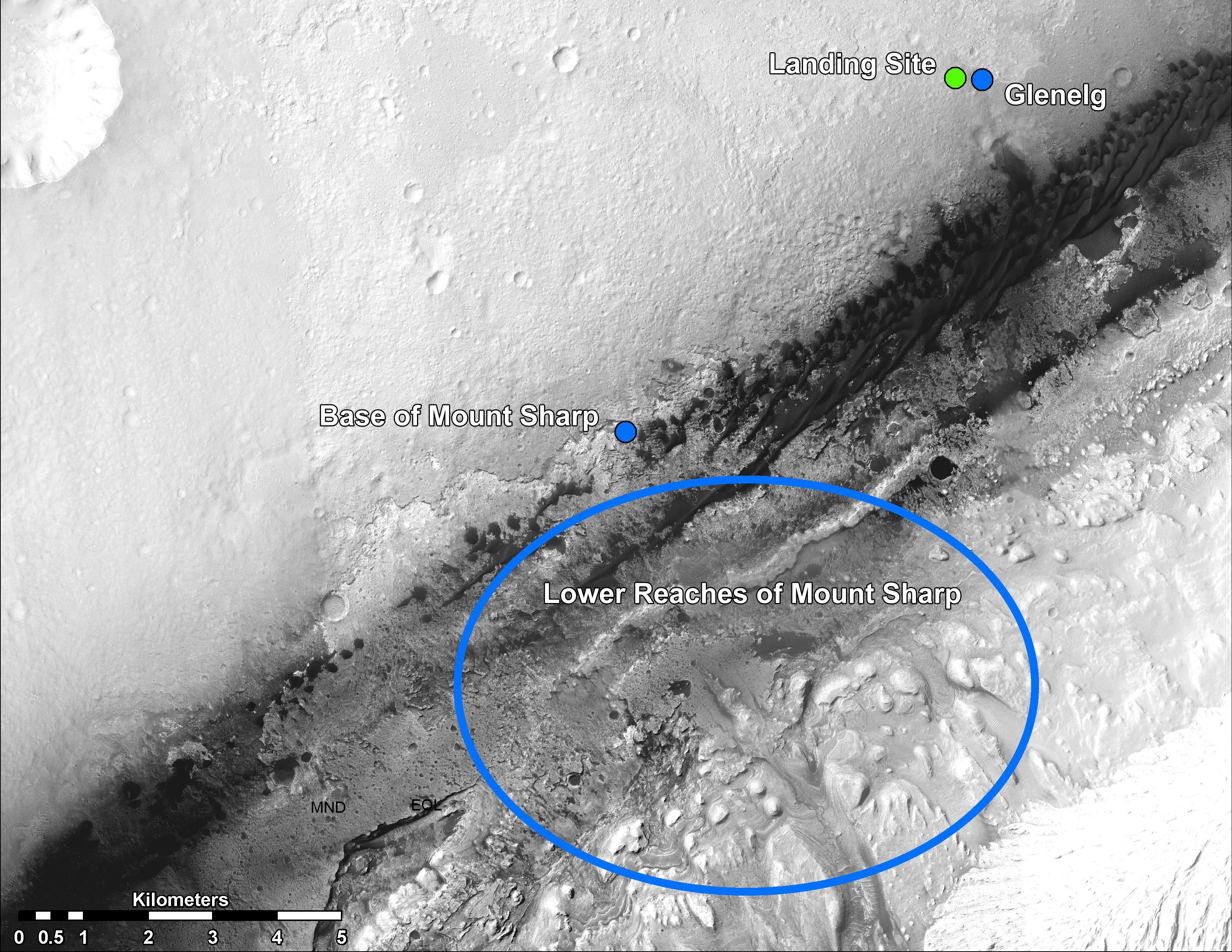
Overview map - blue oval marks "Base of Aeolis Mons" (August 17, 2012).

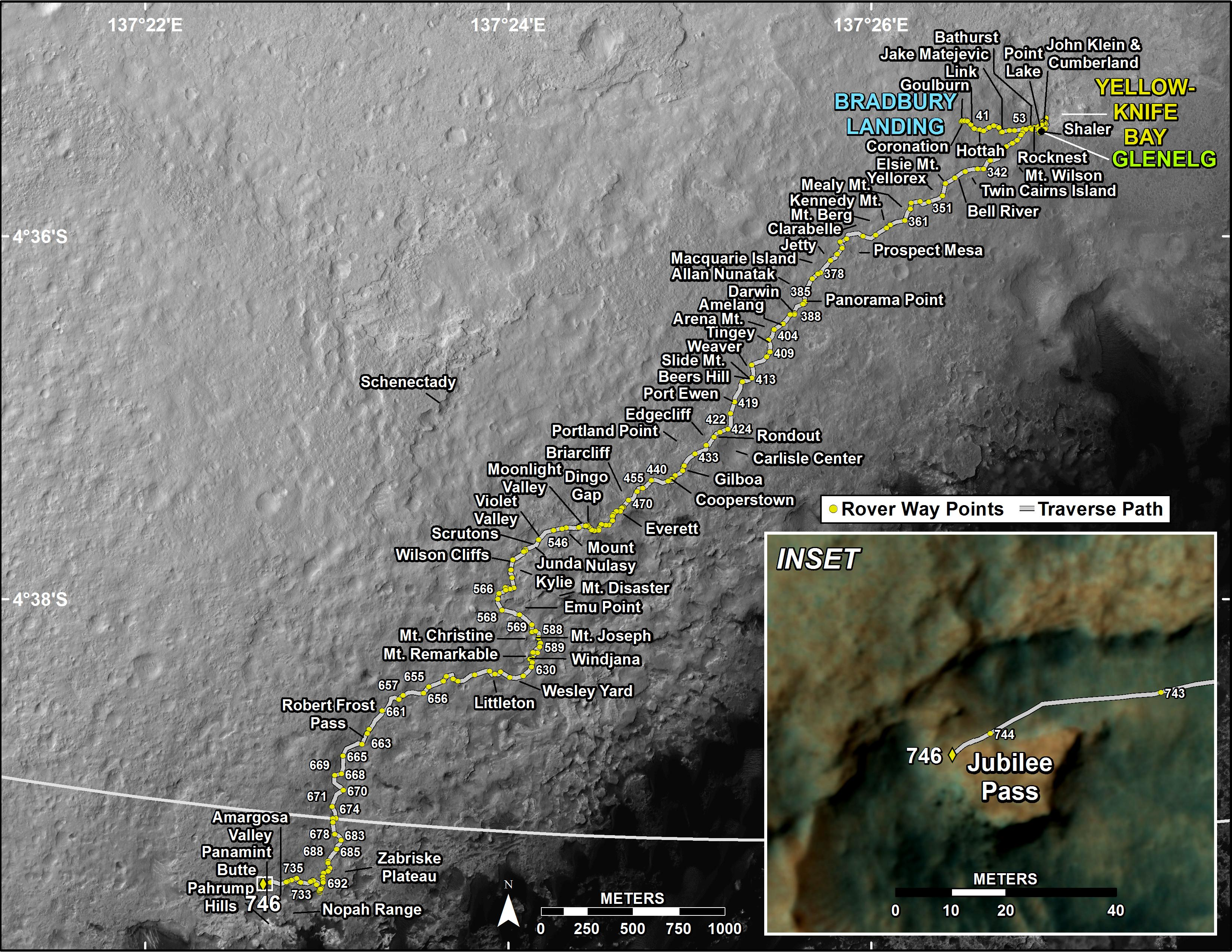
Traverse map - route from Landing to slopes on Aeolis Mons (September 11, 2014).

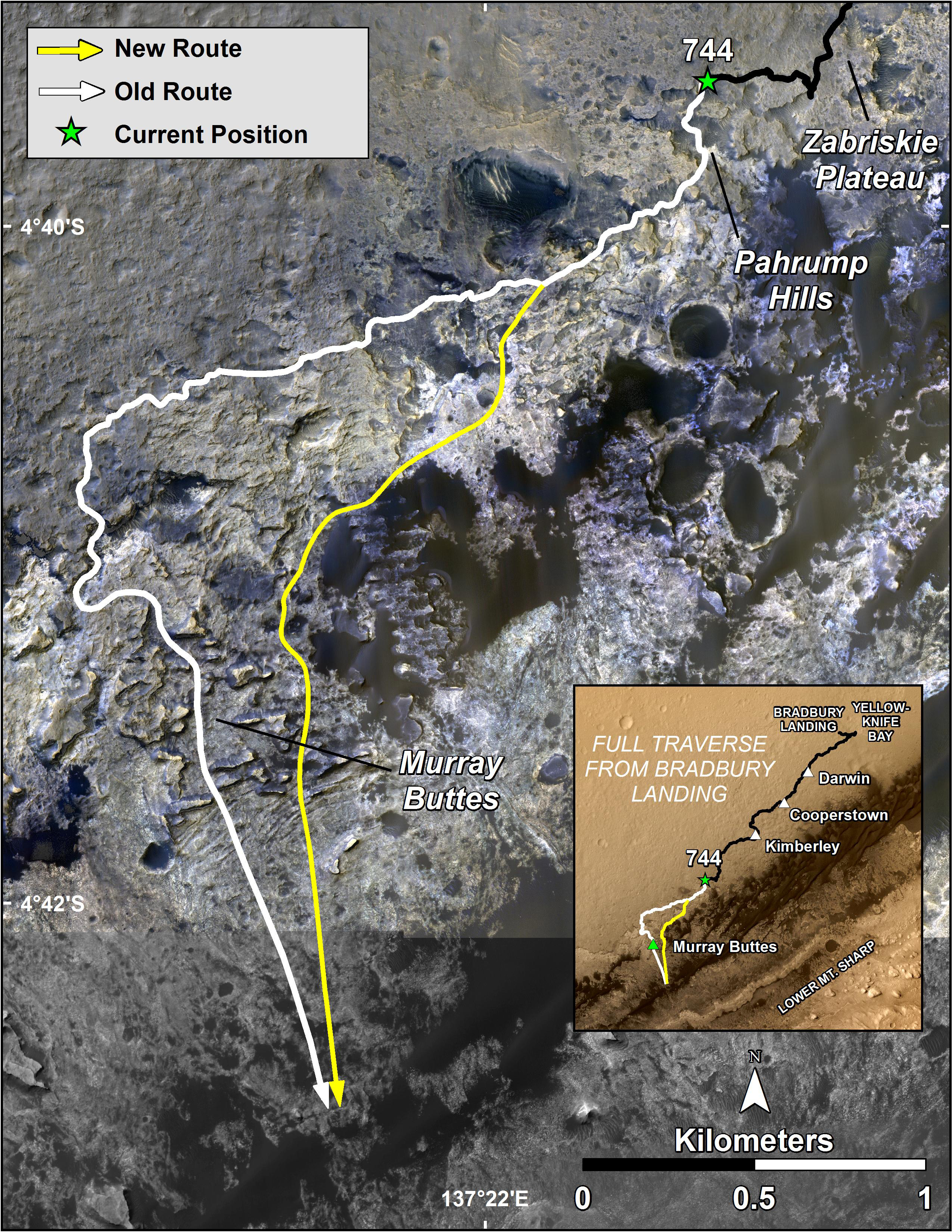
Close-up Map - new route (yellow) - Aeolis Mons slopes (September 11, 2014).

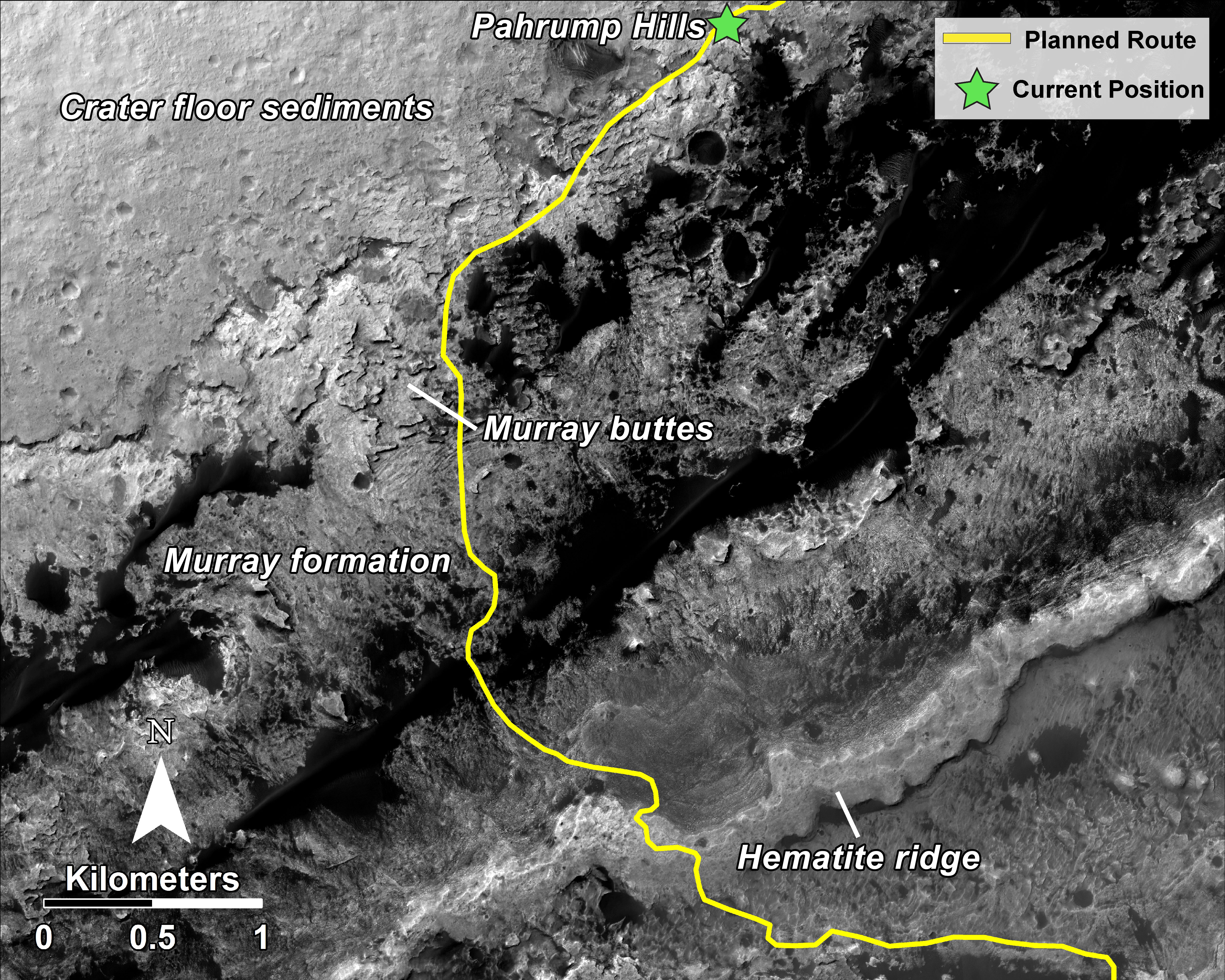
Close-up map - new route (yellow) - Aeolis Mons slopes (September 11, 2014).

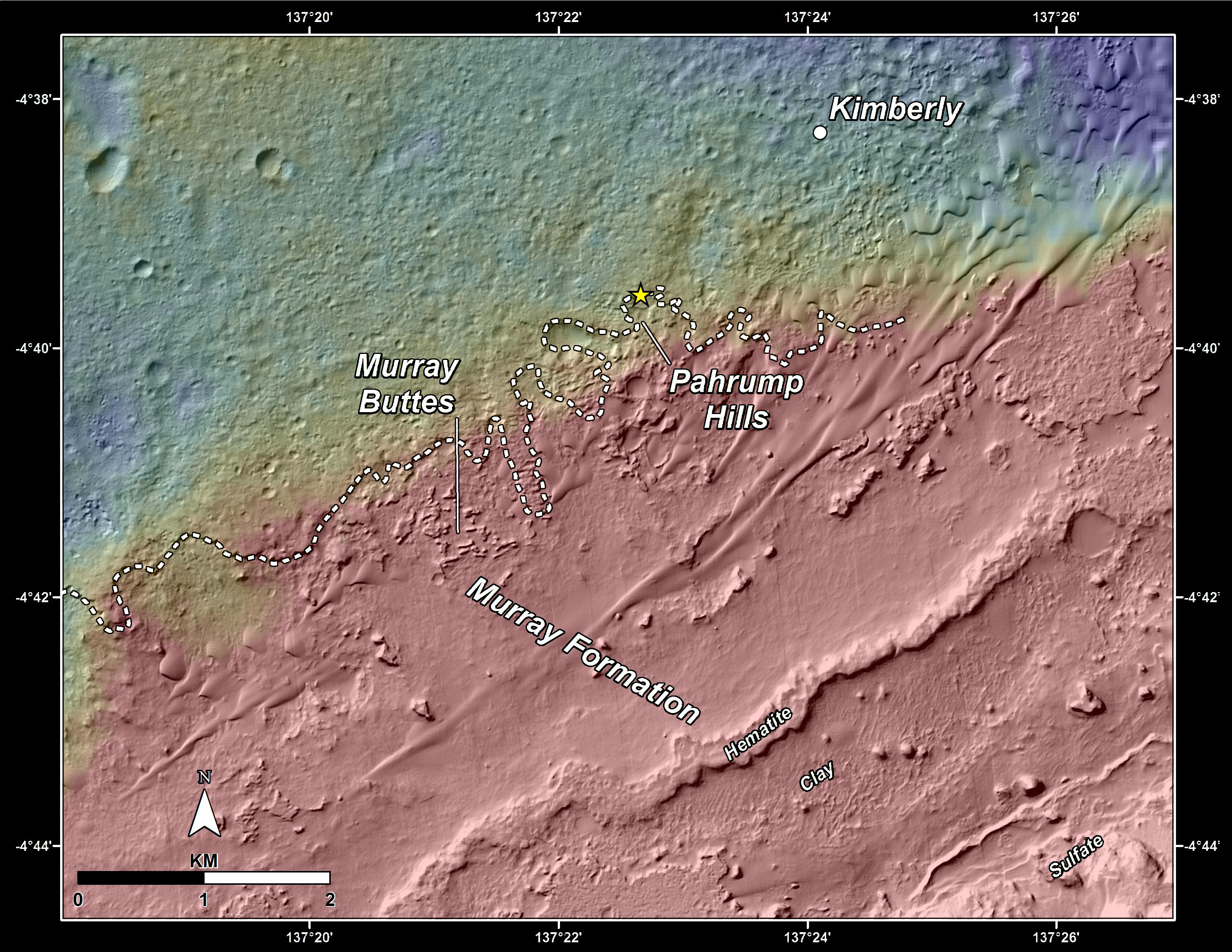
Close-up map - Aeolis Mons slopes - with few craters (bottom) (September 11, 2014).

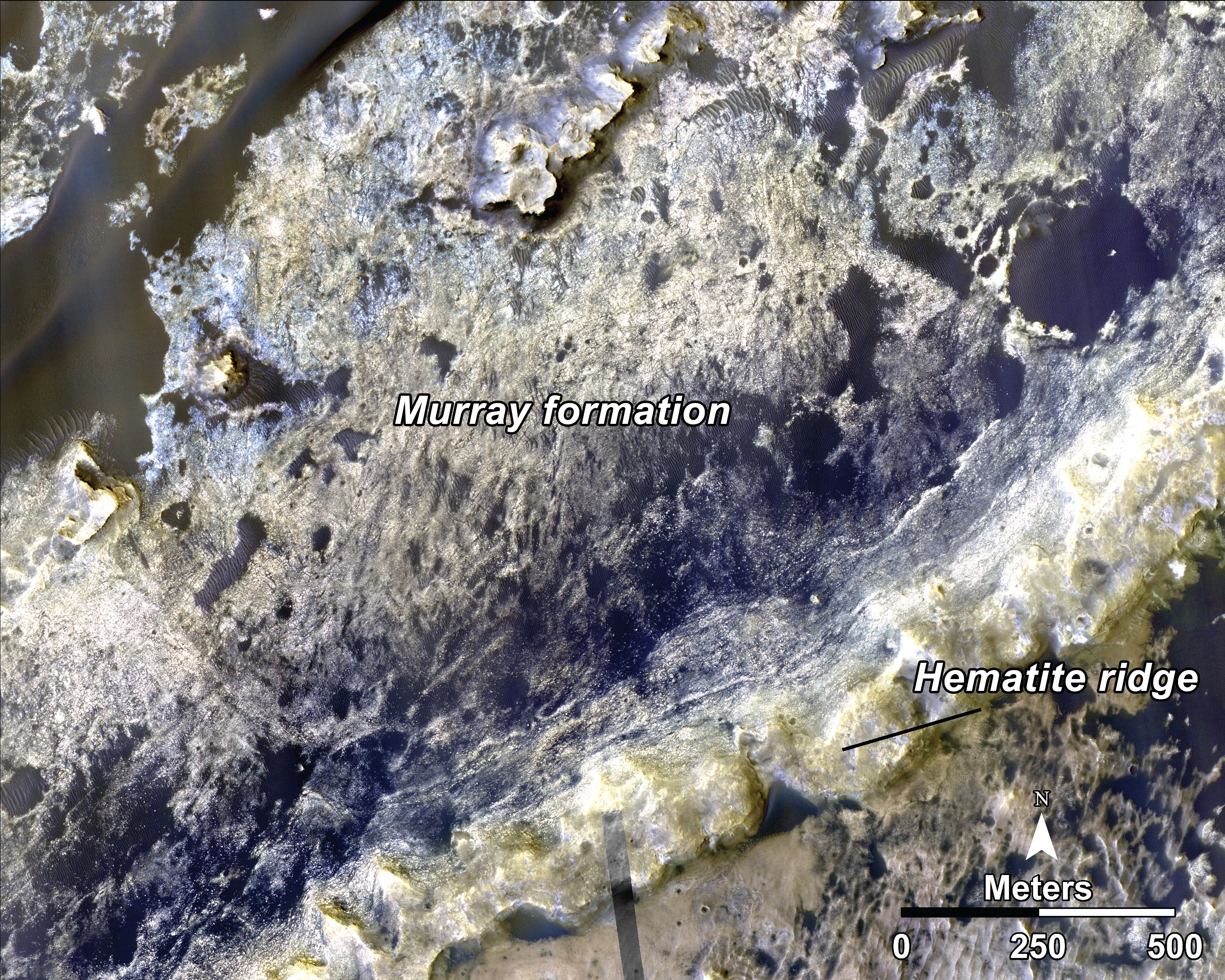
Geology map - Aeolis Mons slopes (September 11, 2014).

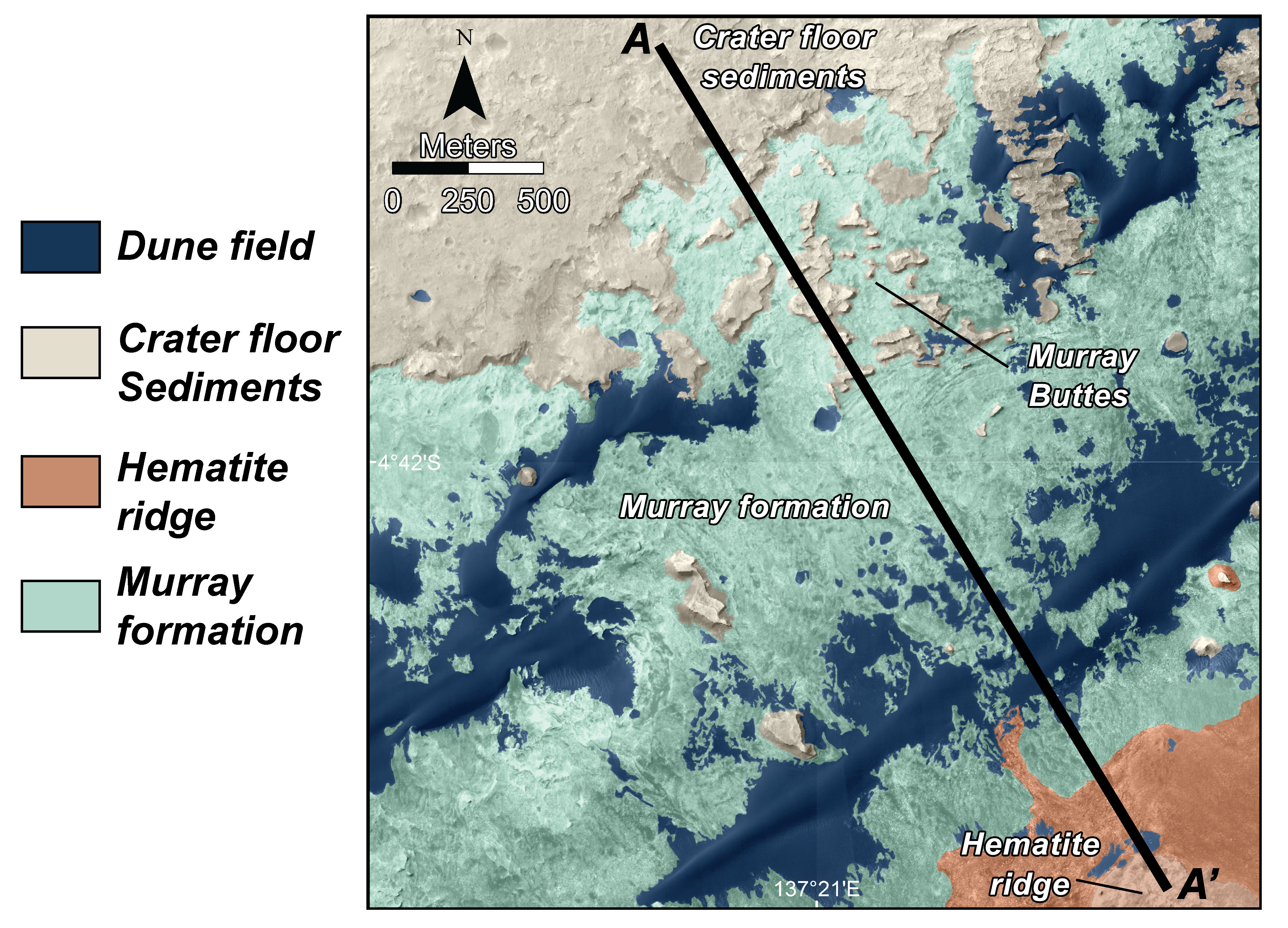
Geology map - Aeolis Mons slopes (September 11, 2014).

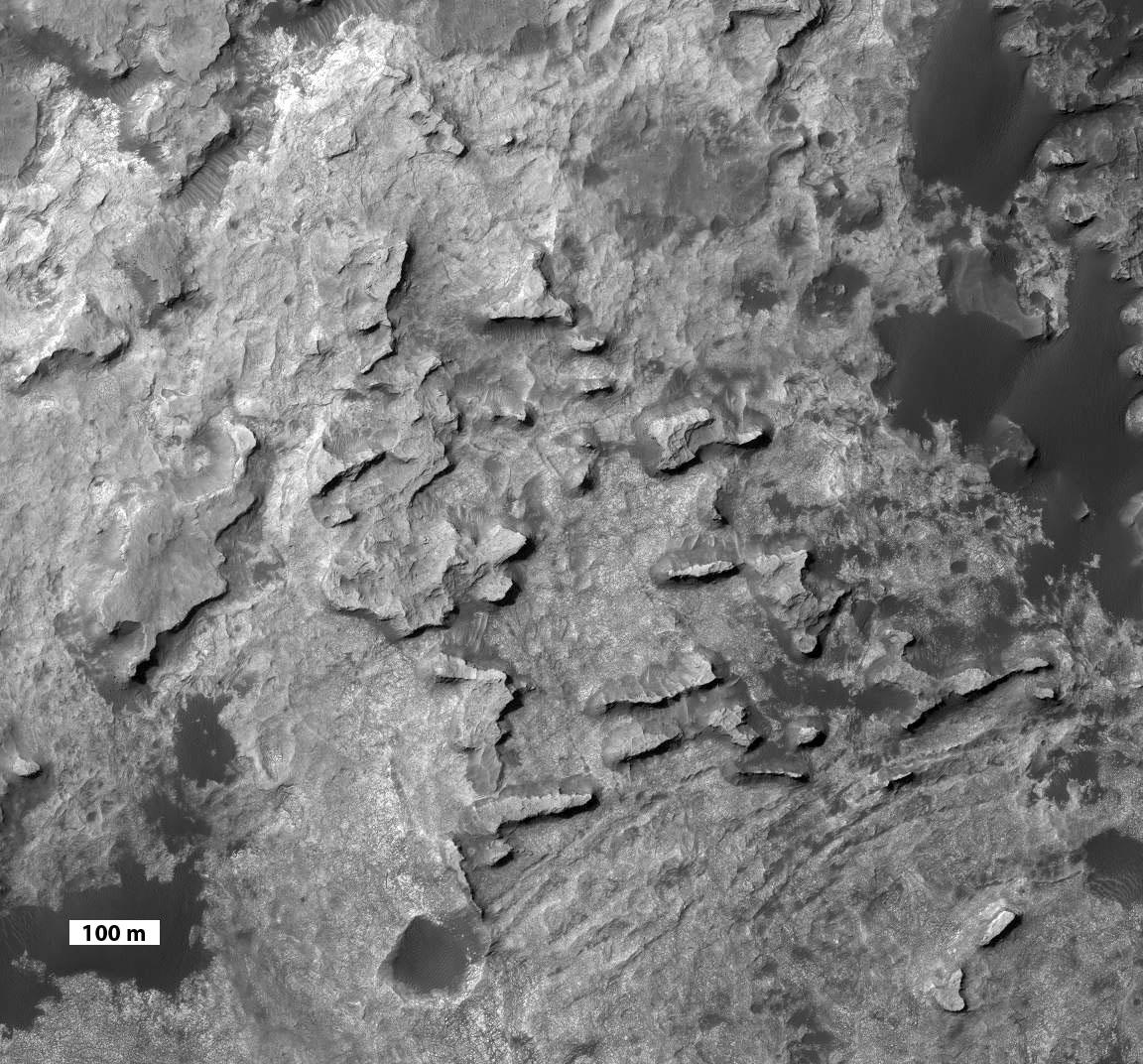
"Murray Buttes" knobs - Aeolis Mons slopes (November 13, 2013).

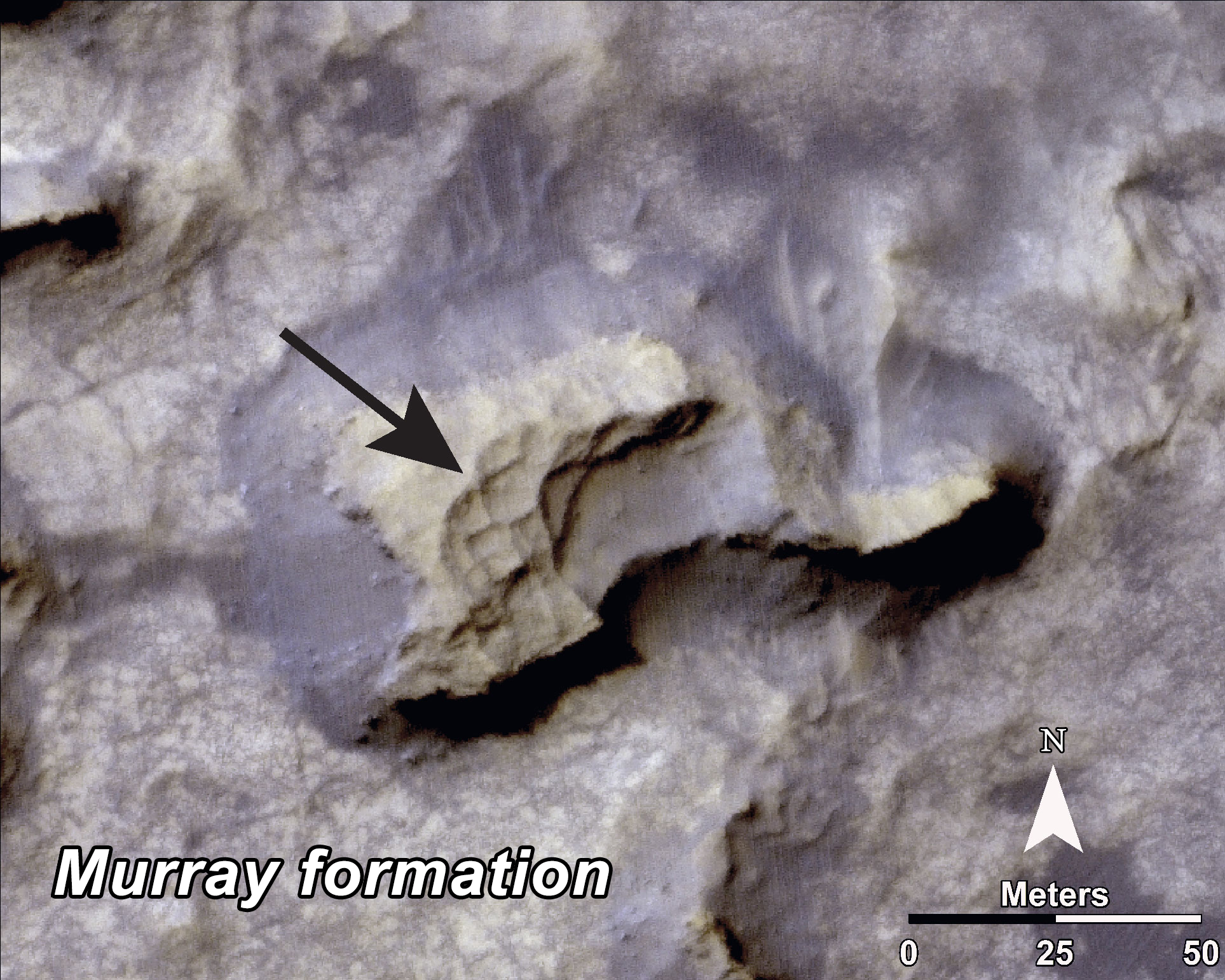
"Murray Buttes" mesa - Aeolis Mons slopes (September 11, 2014).

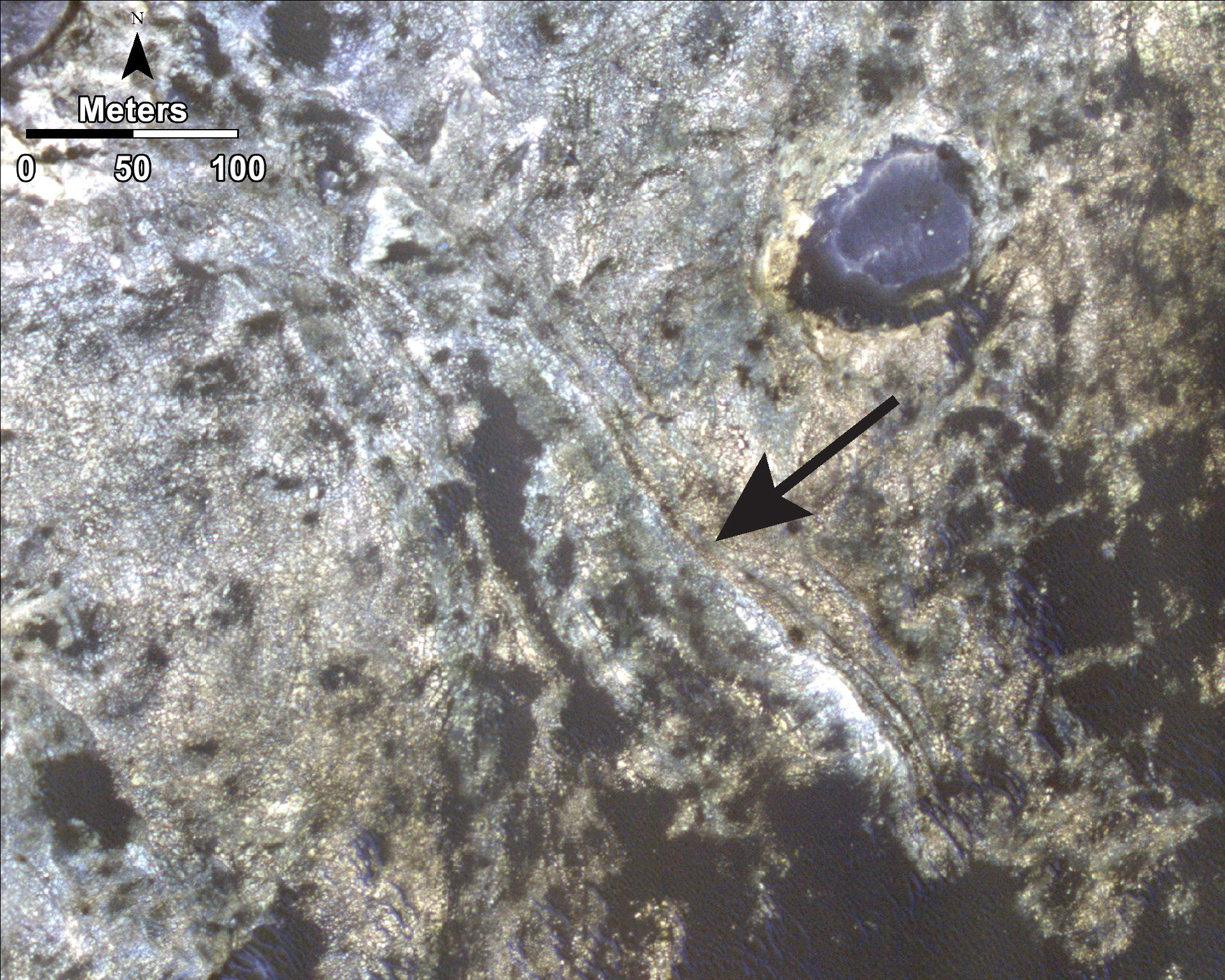
"Murray Formation" bands - Aeolis Mons slopes (September 11, 2014).

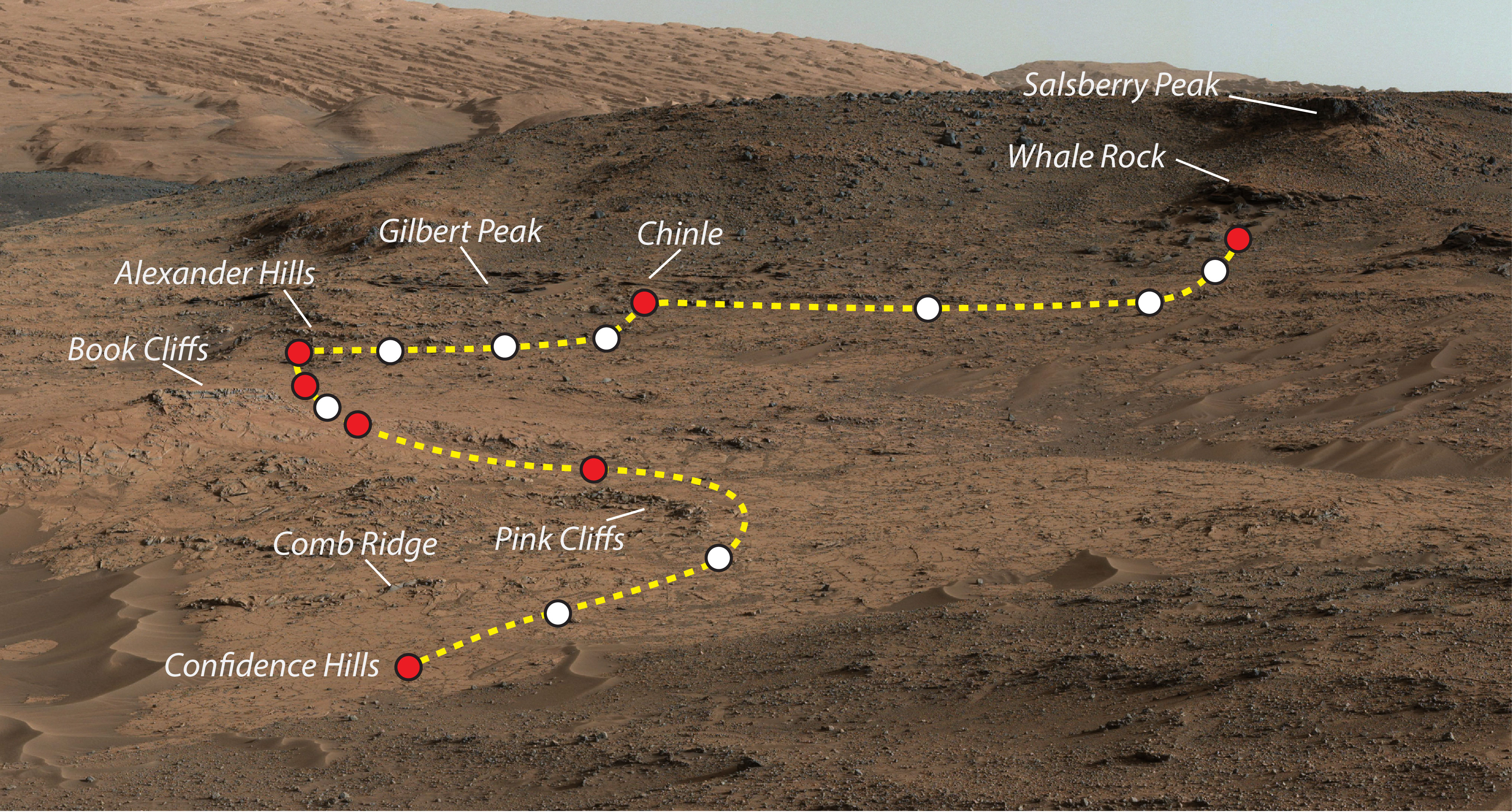
"Pahrump Hills" - Notable places at base of Aeolis Mons (Autumn, 2014).

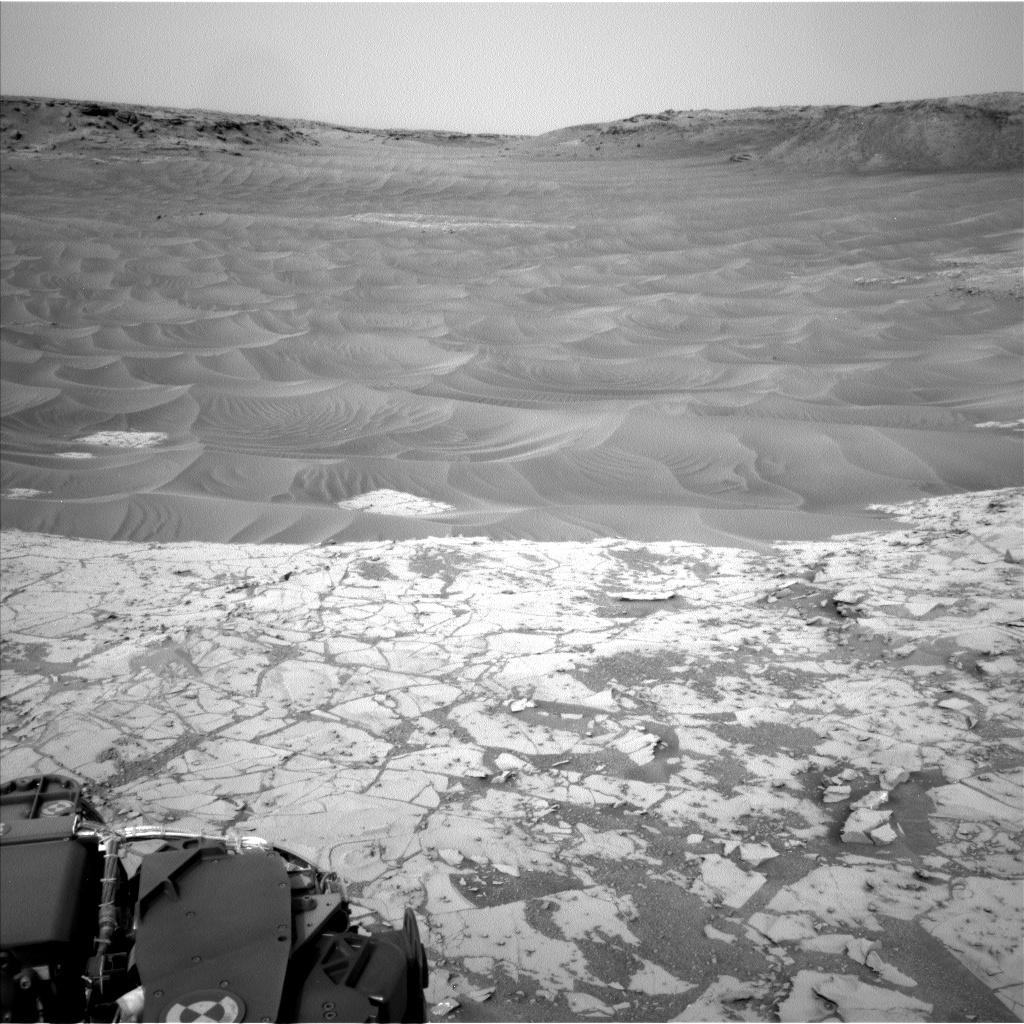
"Pahrump Hills" sand - viewed by Curiosity (November 13, 2014).

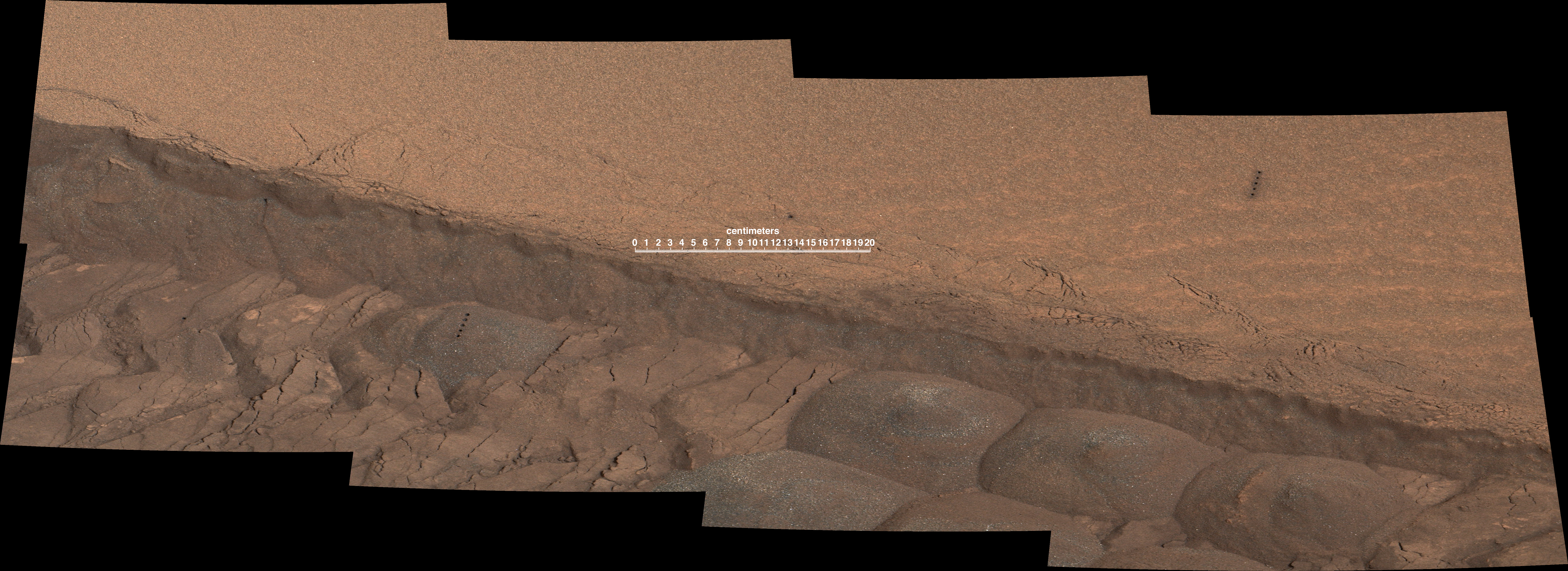
"Pahrump Hills" sand - Curiosity's tracks (November 7, 2014).

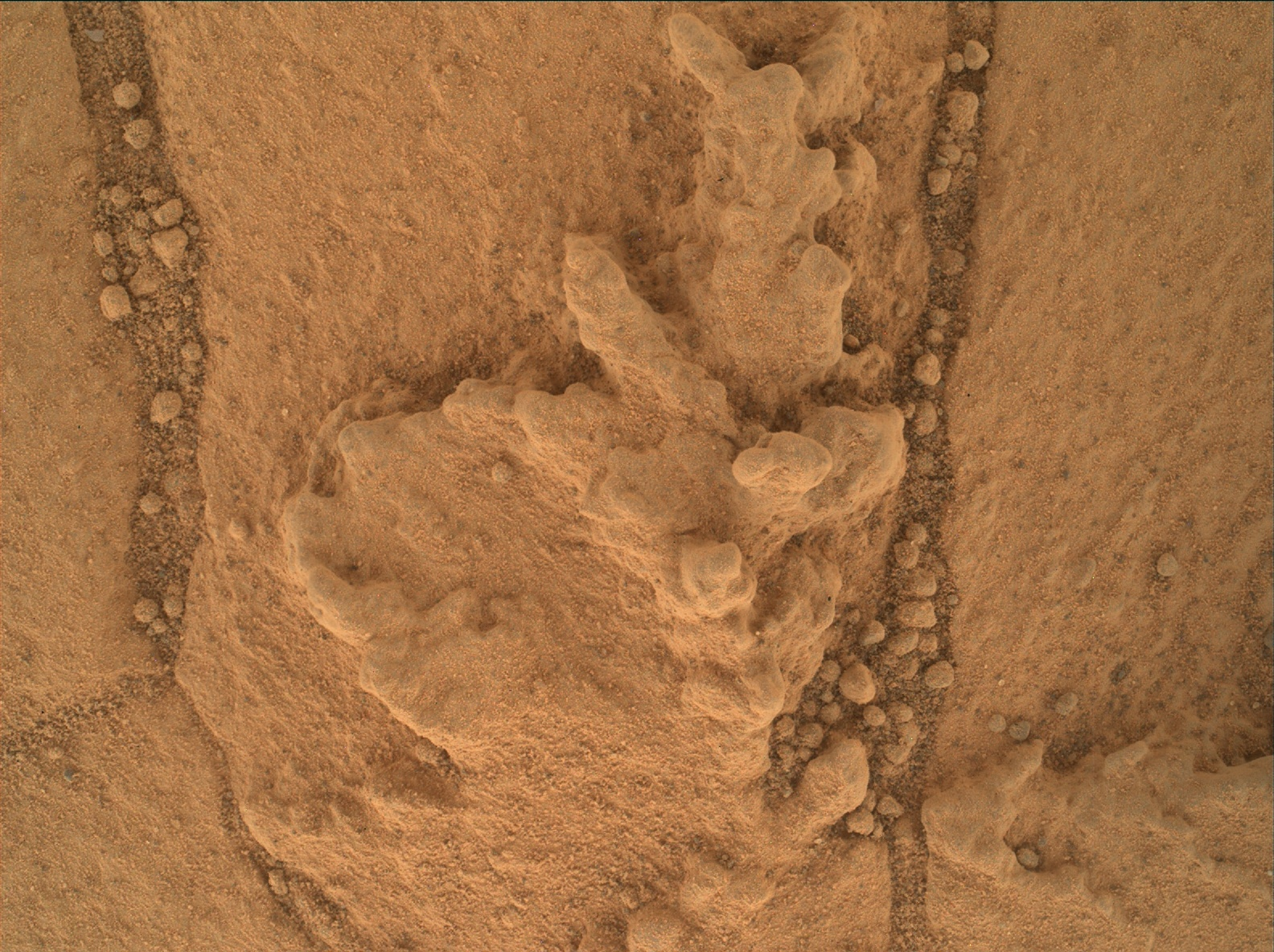
"Pahrump Hills" rock outcrop on Mars – viewed by Curiosity (September 23, 2014).

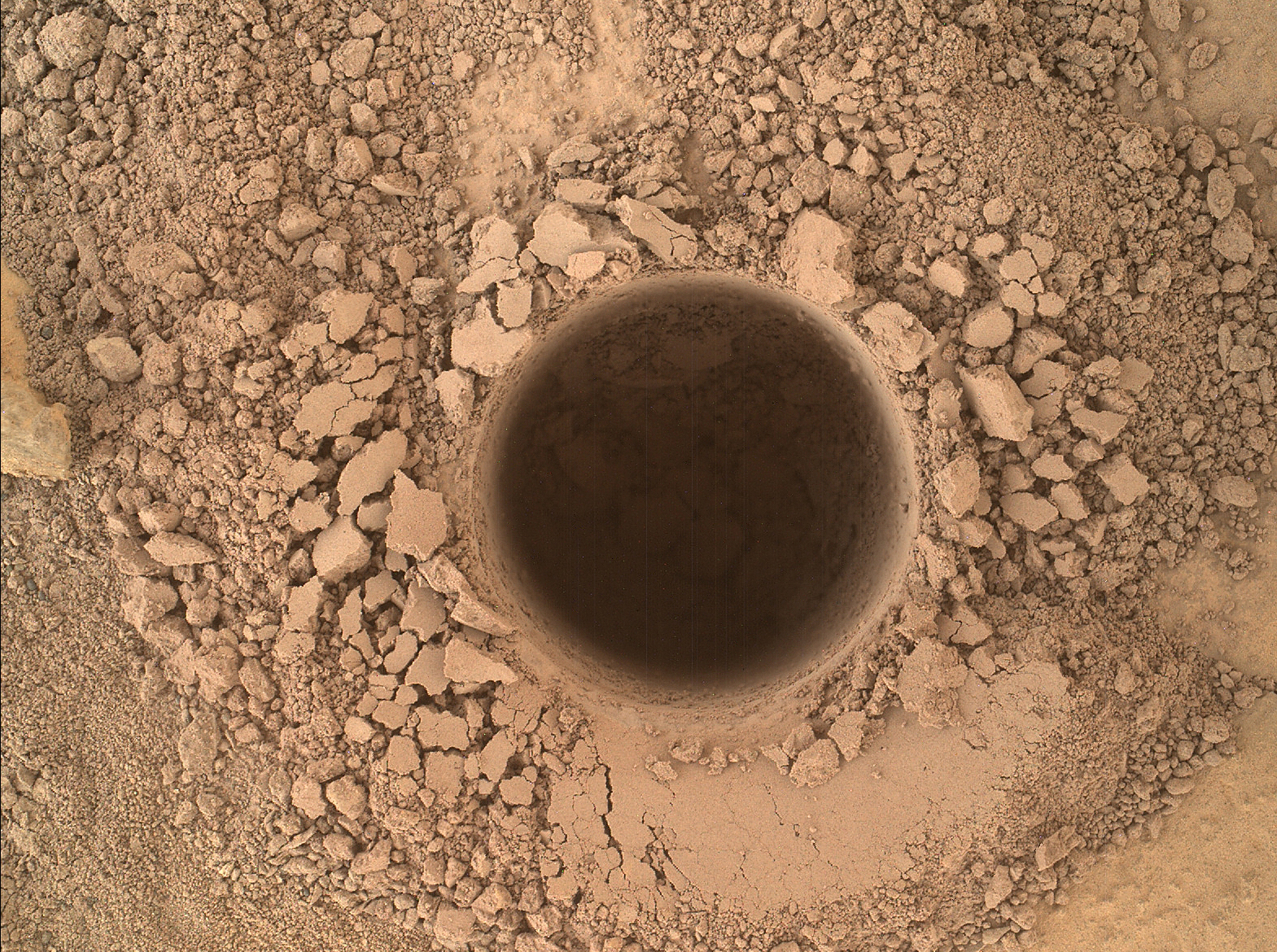
"Confidence Hills" rock on Mars - Curiosity's 1st target at Aeolis Mons (September 24, 2014).

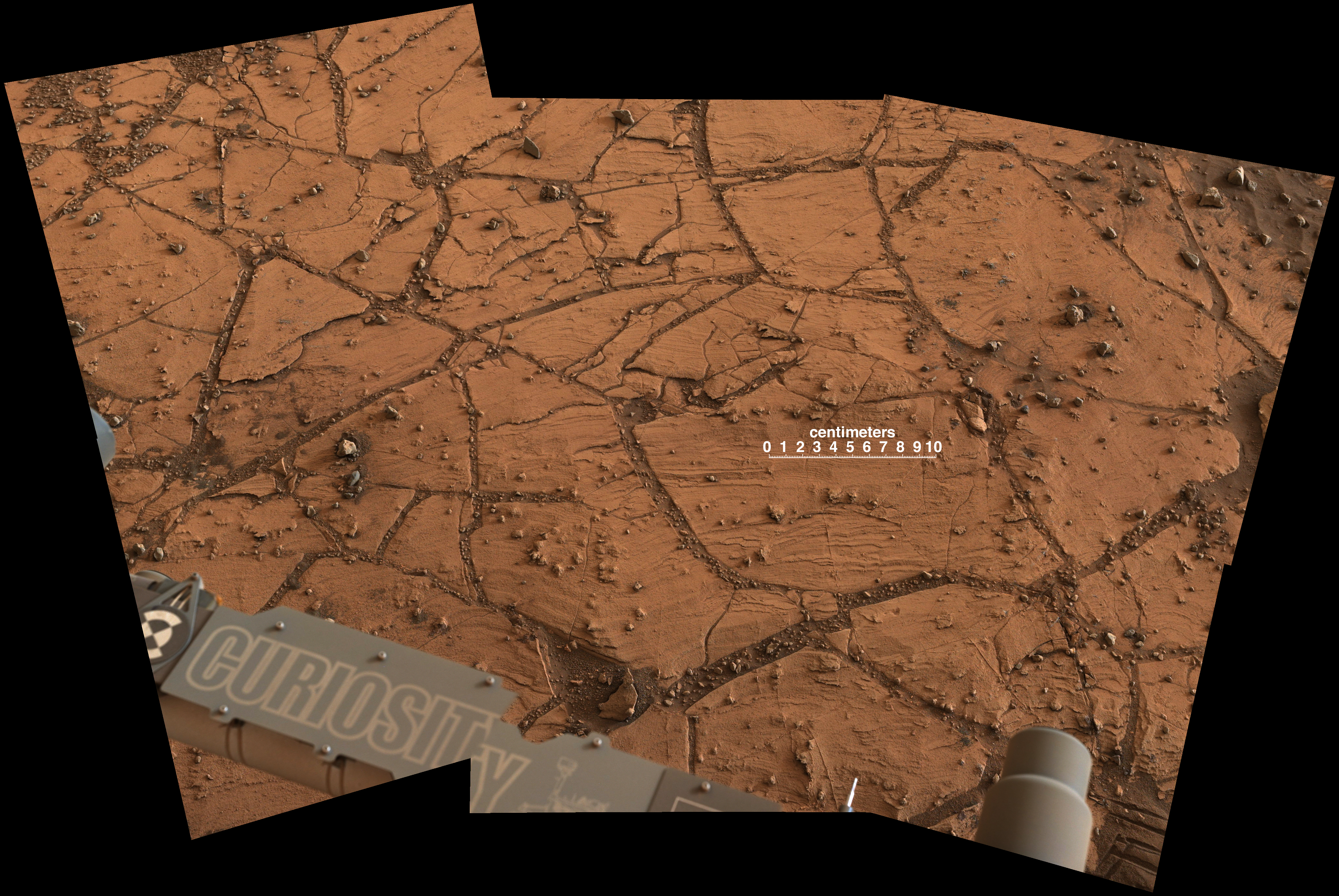
"Pahrump Hills" bedrock on Mars - viewed by Curiosity (November 9, 2014).

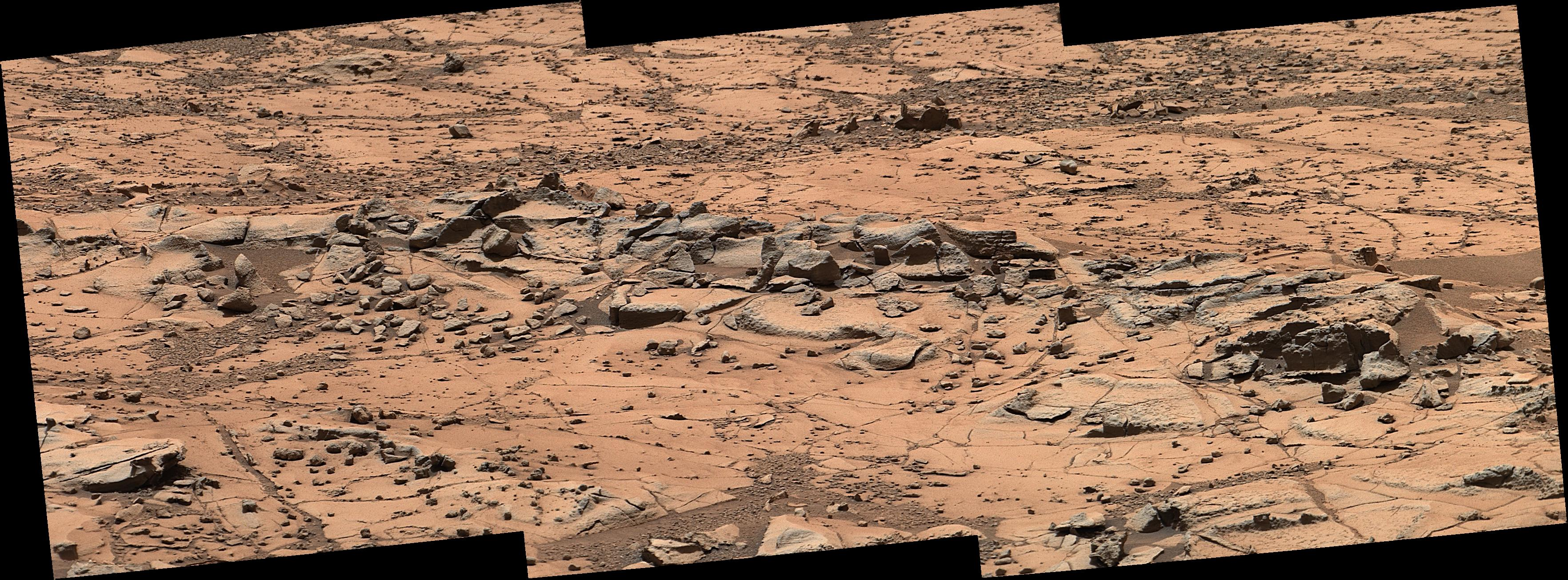
"Pink Cliffs" rock outcrop on Mars - viewed by Curiosity (October 7, 2014).

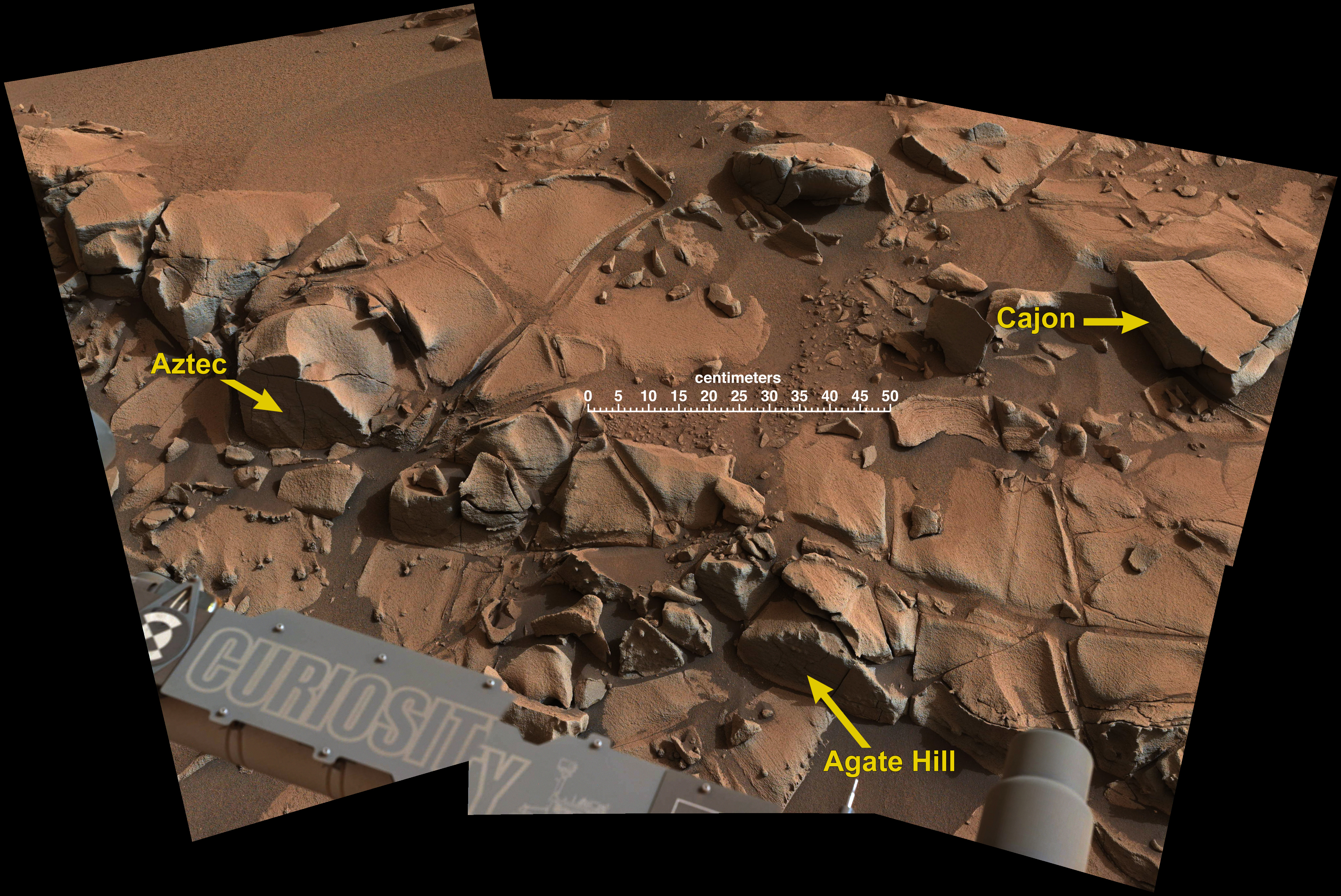
"Alexander Hills" bedrock on Mars - viewed by Curiosity (November 23, 2014).

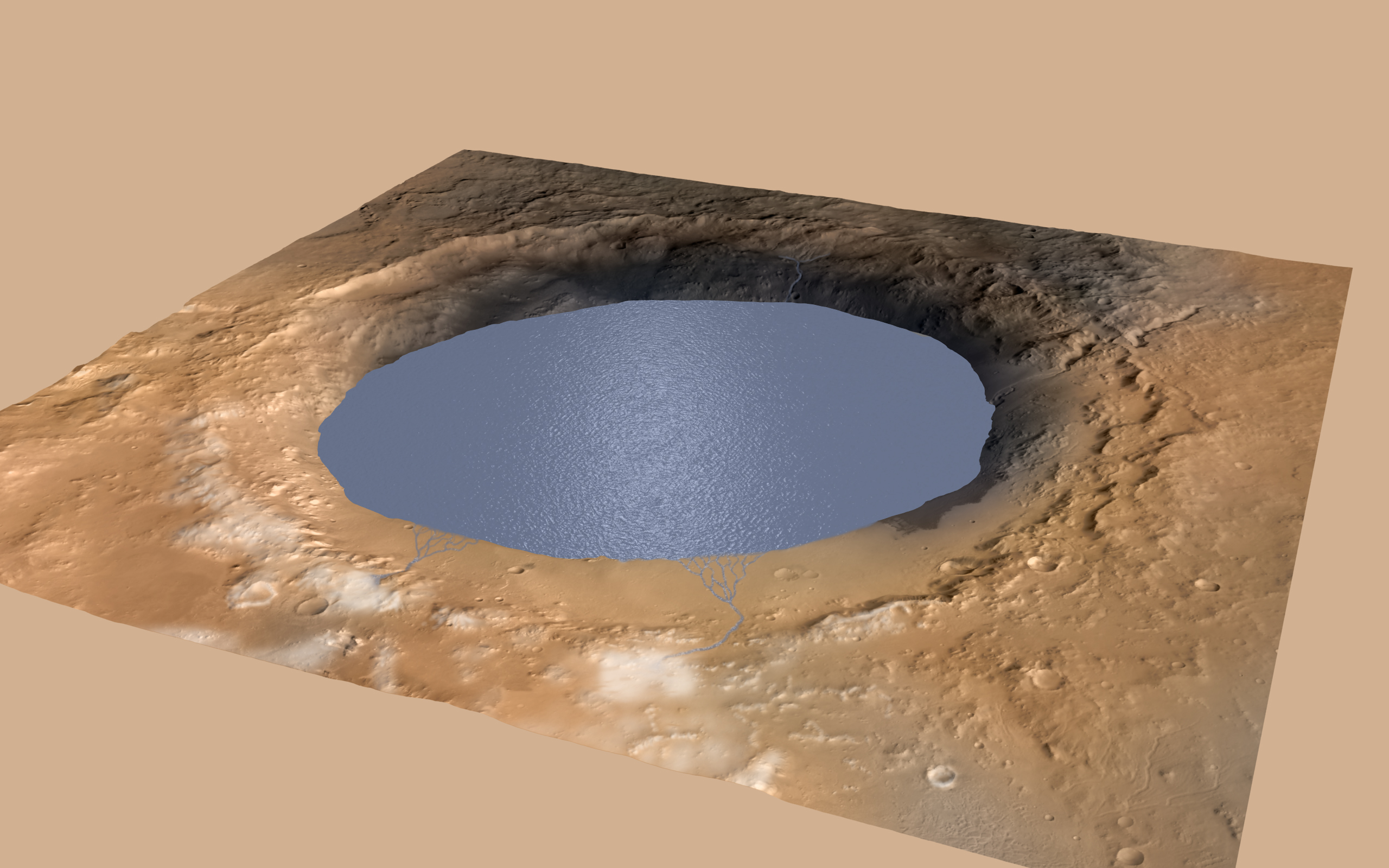
Ancient Lake fills Gale Crater on Mars (simulated view).

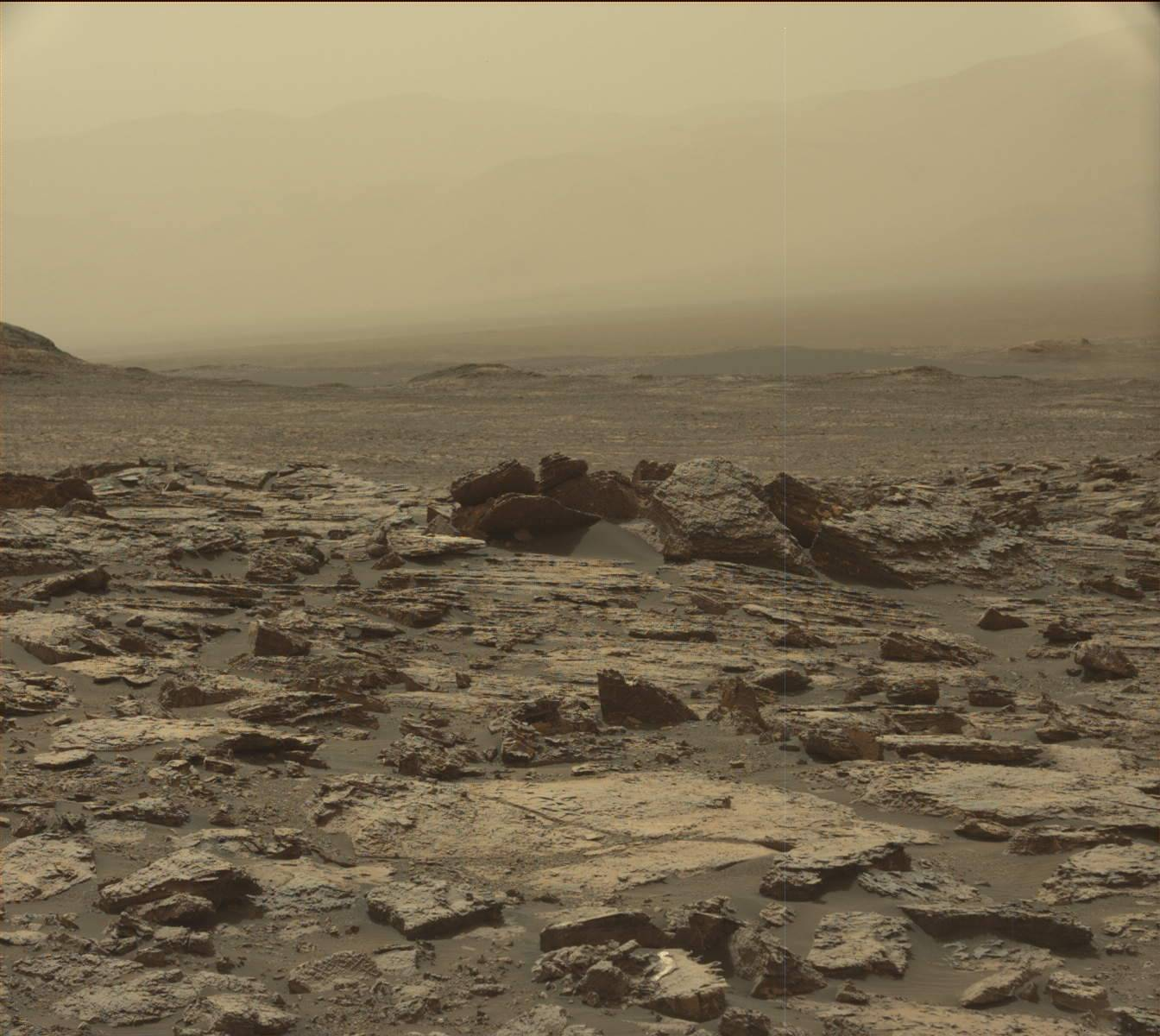
Murray formation lakebeds with aeolian(?) erosional fins (October 9, 2016)

Curiosity drilled into a "clay-bearing unit". (April 11, 2019)
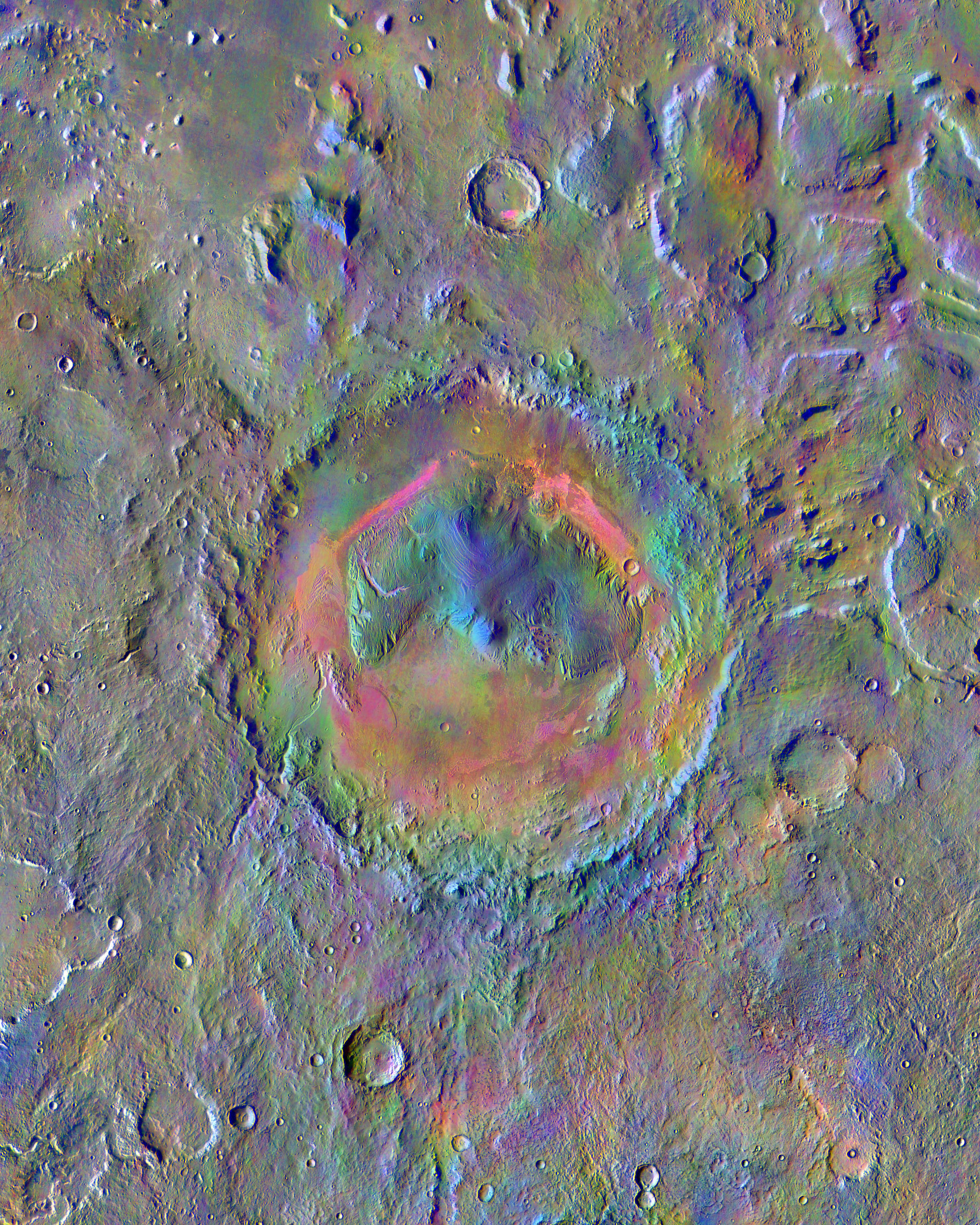
Gale crater - surface materials (false colors; THEMIS; 2001 Mars Odyssey).

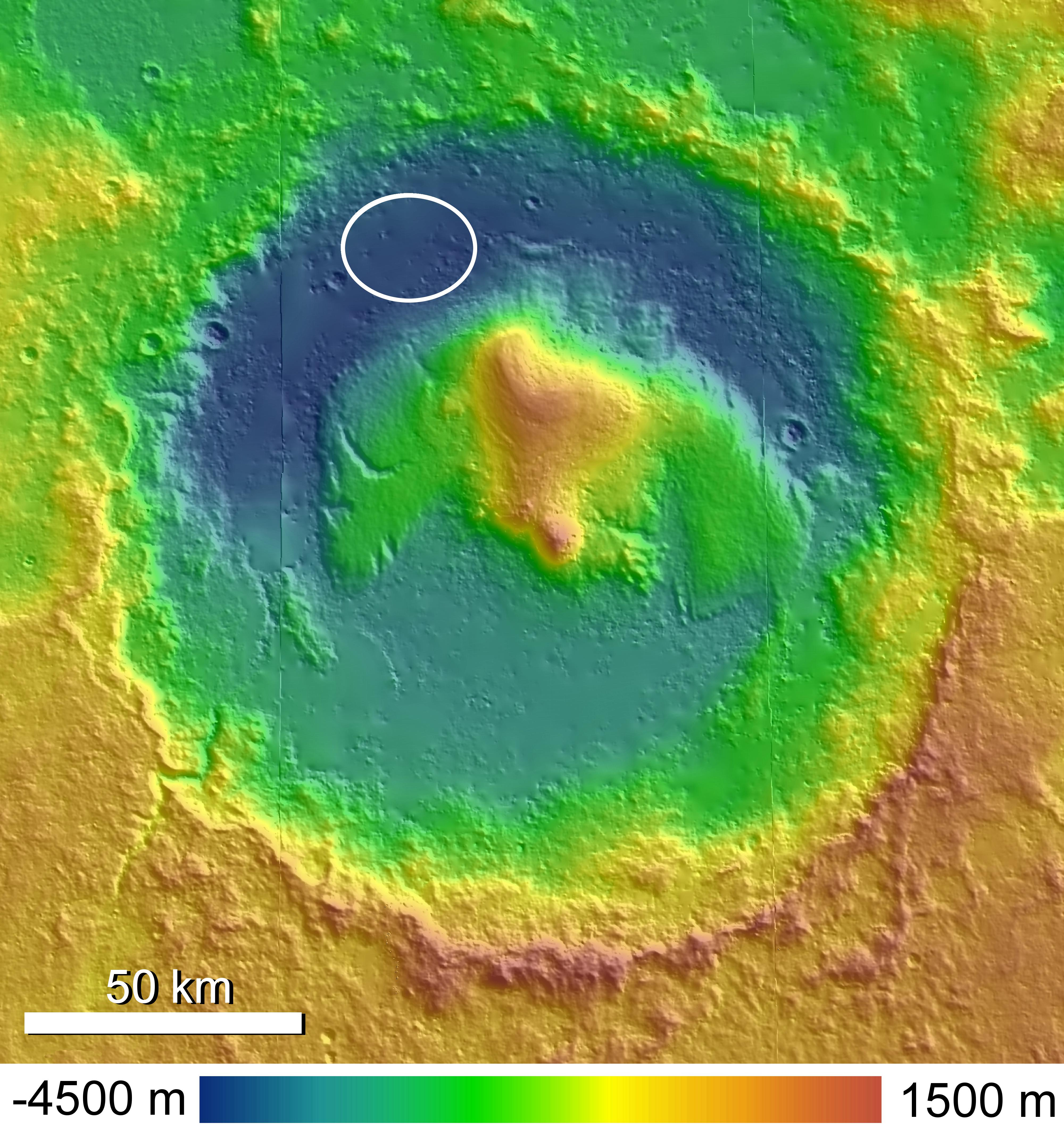
Gale crater with Aeolis Mons rising from the center. Curiosity's landing area (marked) is in Aeolis Palus.

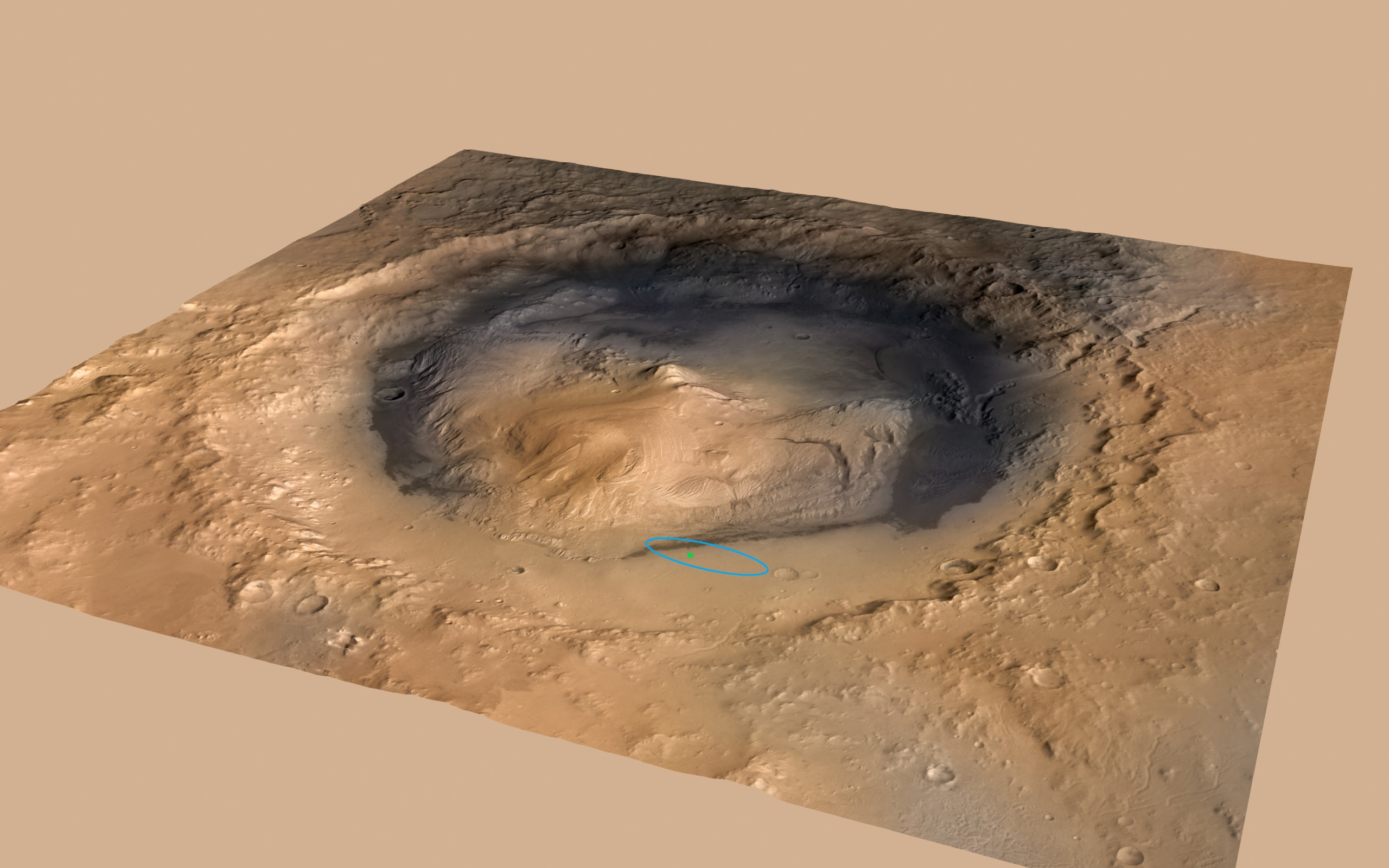
Aeolis Mons rises from the middle of Gale - Green dot marks Curiosity's landing site in Aeolis Palus.

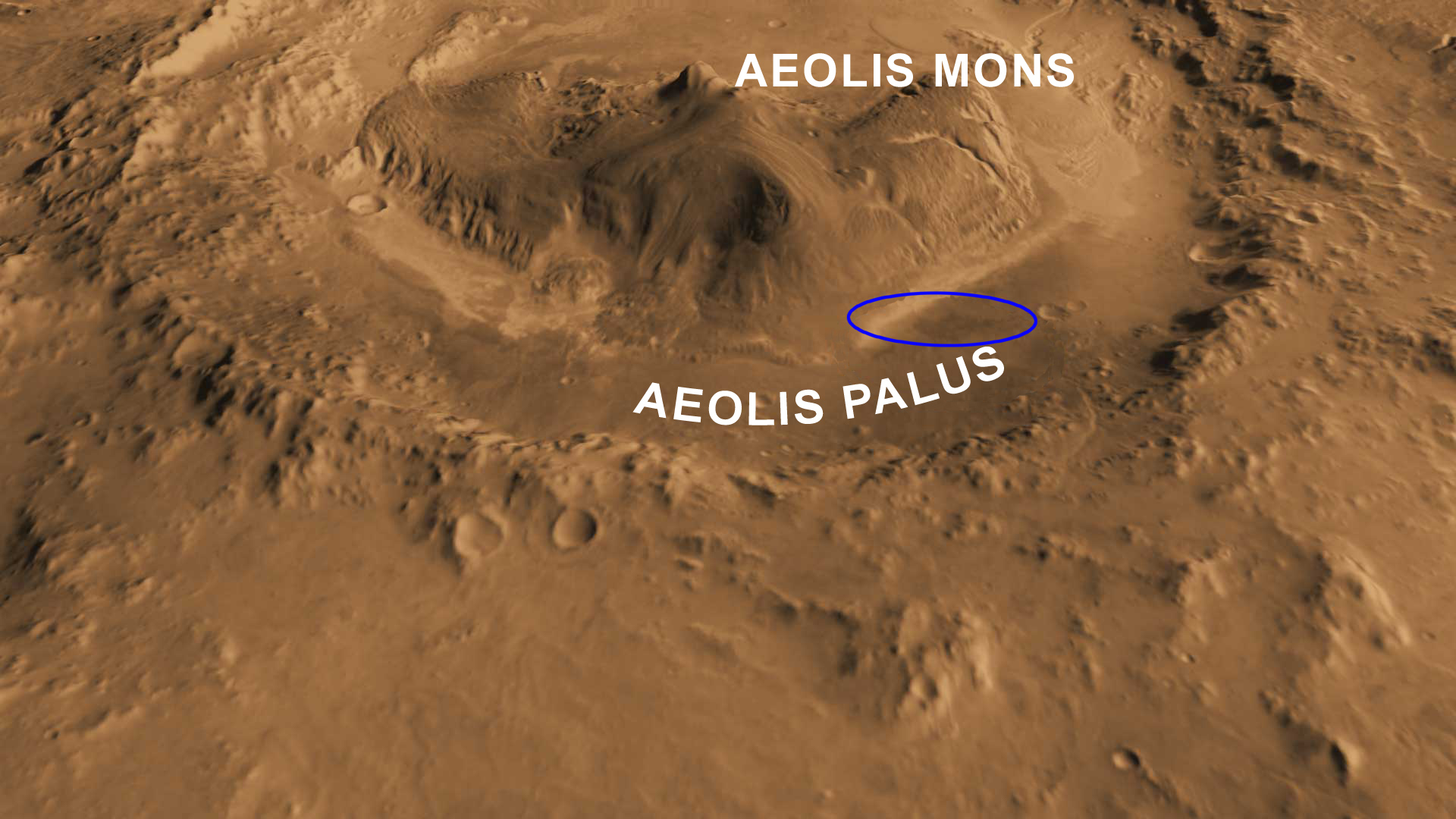
Gale crater with Curiosity's landing area within Aeolis Palus noted - north is down.

Aeolis Mons may have formed from the erosion of sediment layers that once filled Gale.

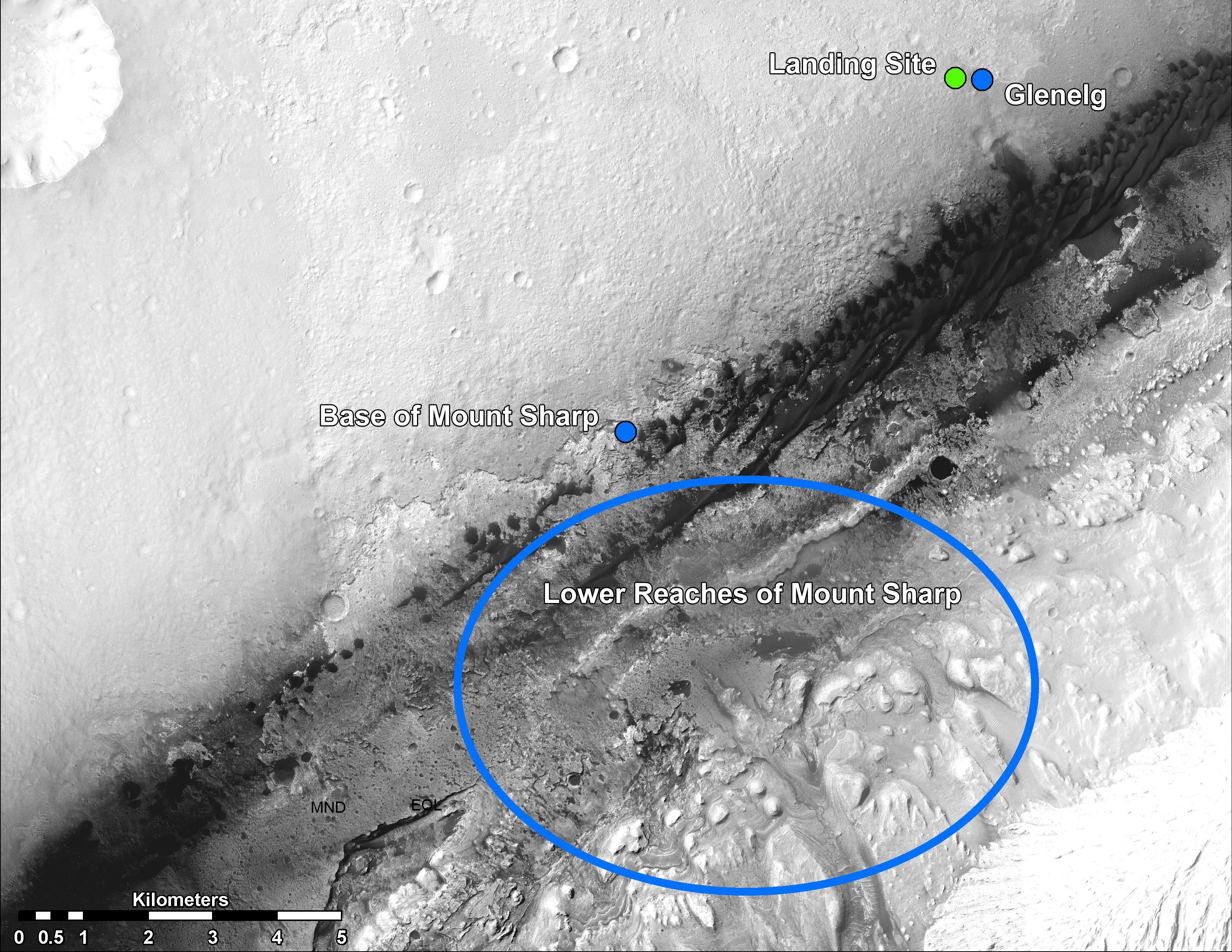
Curiosity's landing site (green dot) - blue dot marks Glenelg Intrigue - blue spot marks the base of Mount Sharp - a planned area of study.

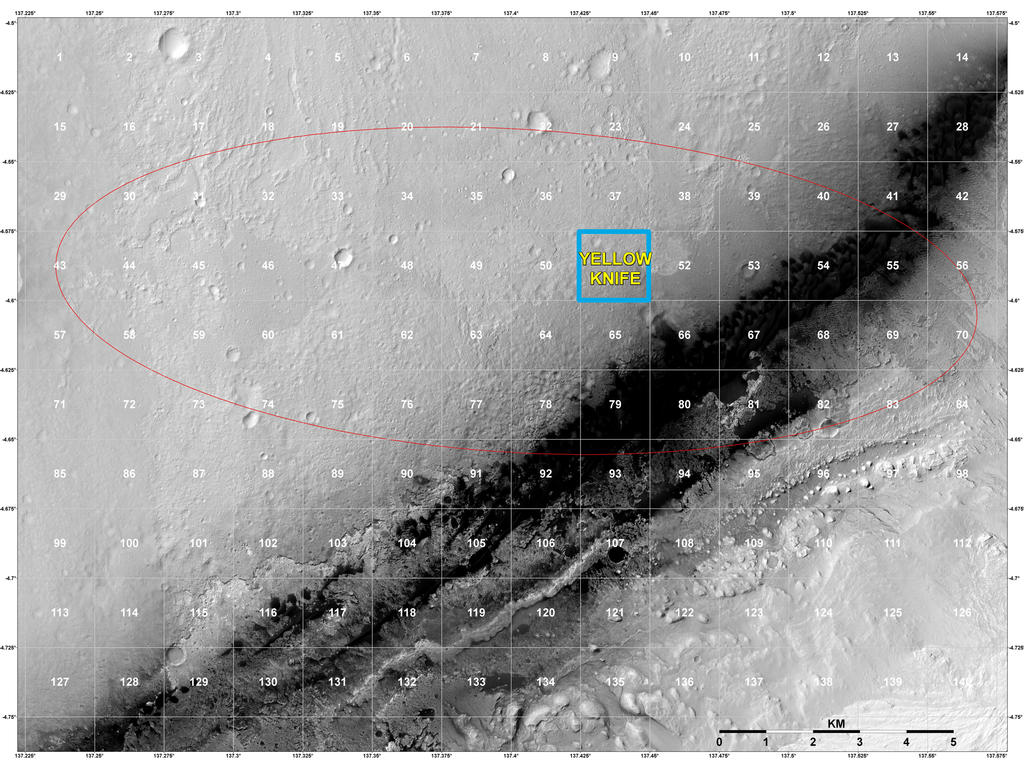
Curiosity's landing site - "Quad Map" includes "Yellowknife" Quad 51 of Aeolis Palus in Gale.

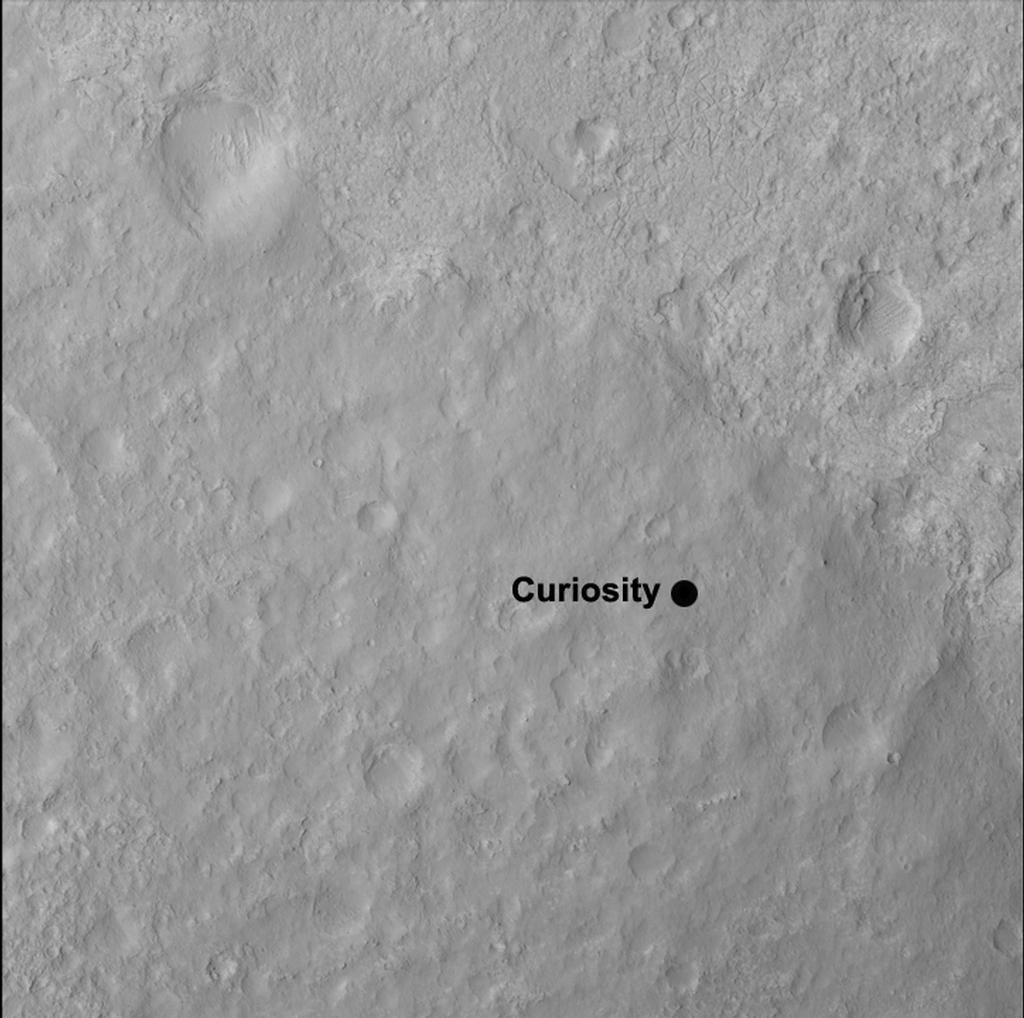
Curiosity's landing site - "Yellowknife" Quad 51 (1-mi-by-1-mi) of Aeolis Palus in Gale.

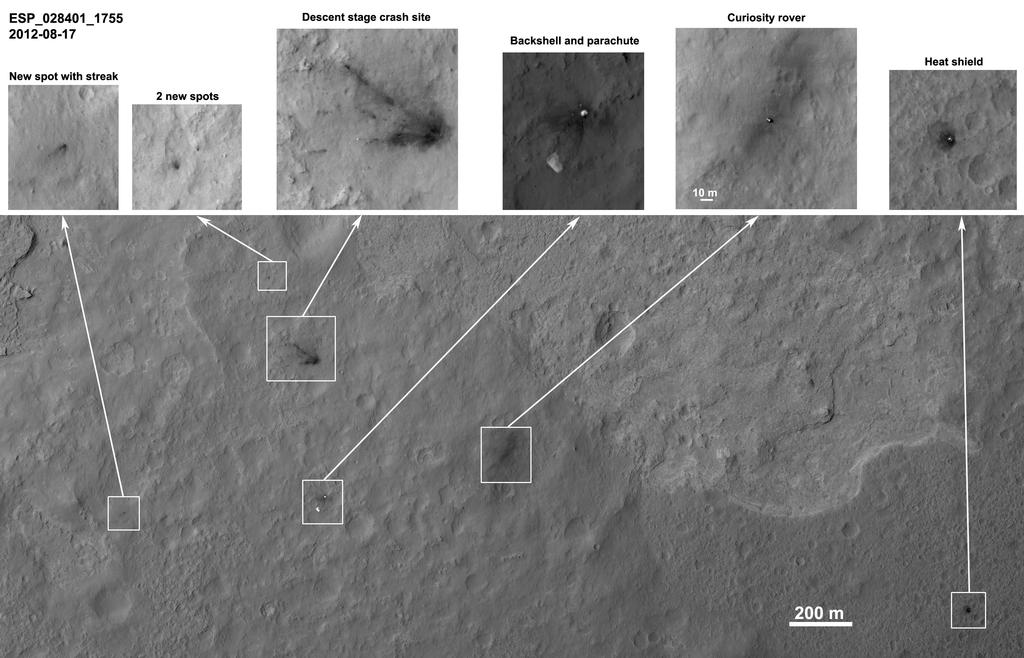
MSL debris field viewed by HiRISE on August 17, 2012 - parachute is 615 m (2,018 ft) from Curiosity. (3-D: rover & parachute)

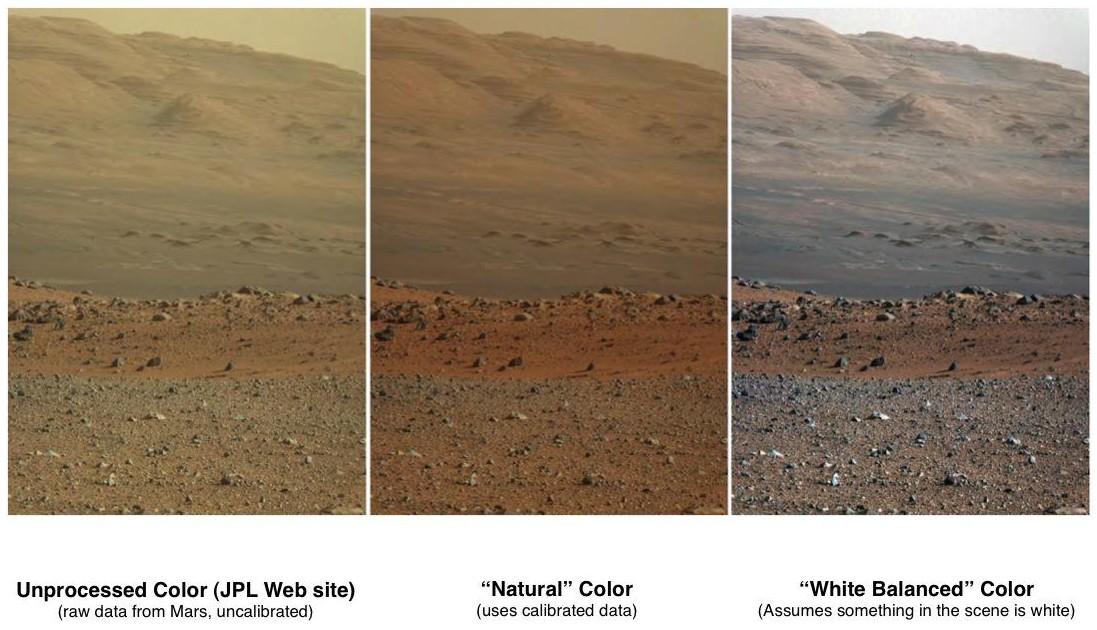
Comparison of color versions (raw, natural, white balance) of Aeolis Mons (August 23, 2012).

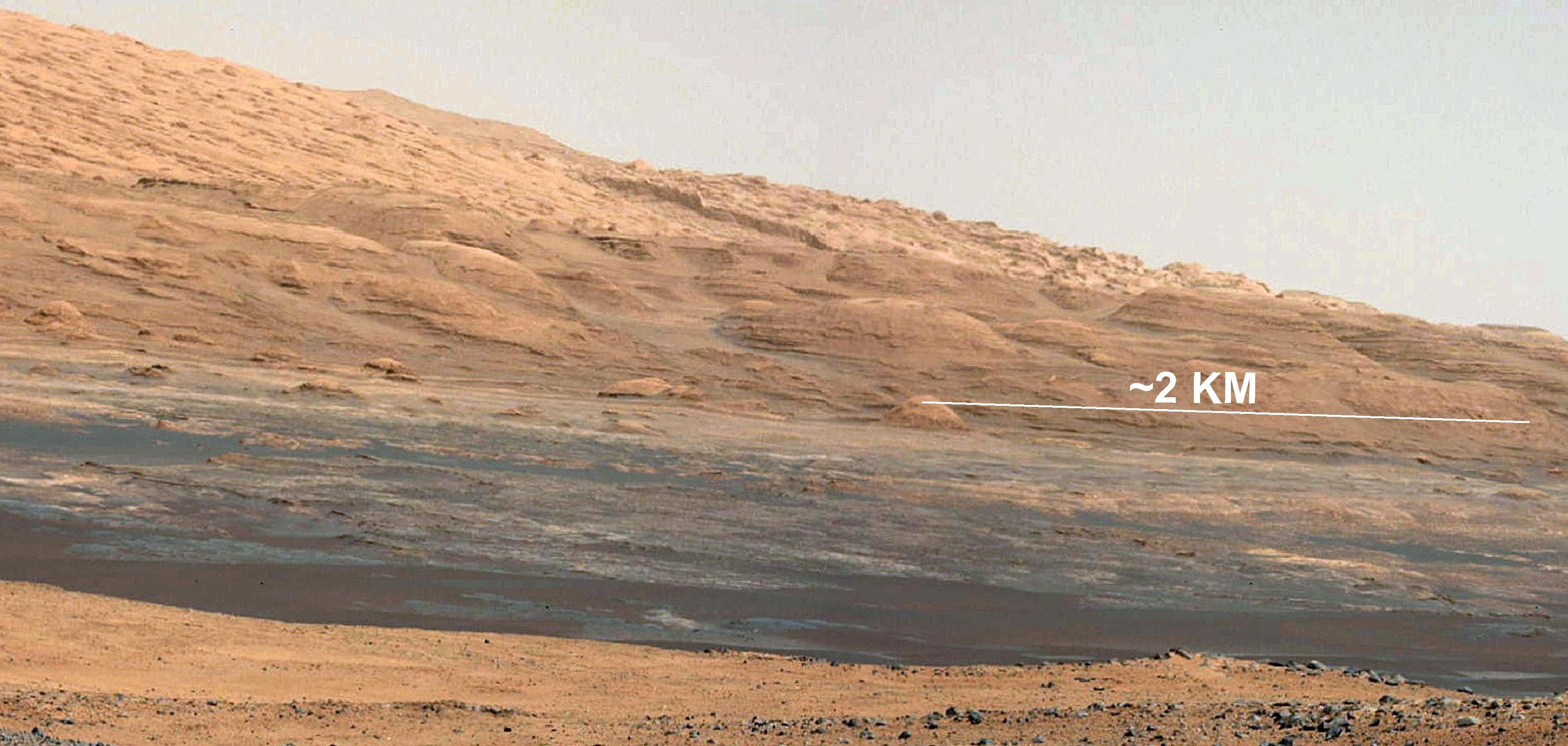
Aeolis Mons as viewed by Curiosity (August 8, 2012) (white balanced image).

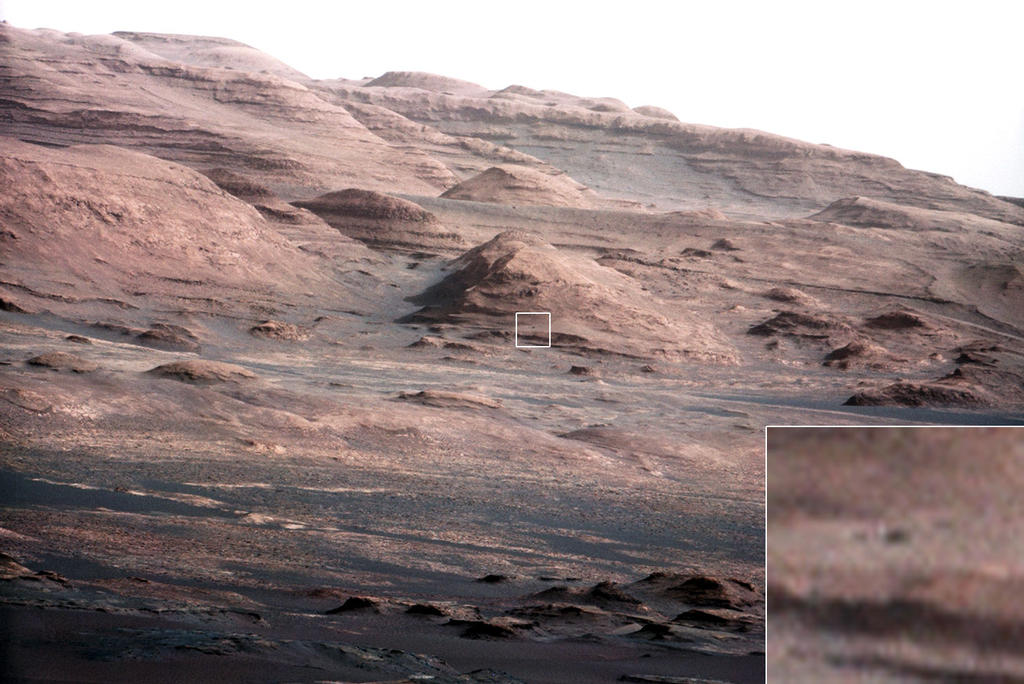
Layers at the base of Aeolis Mons - dark rock in inset is same size as Curiosity (white balanced image).

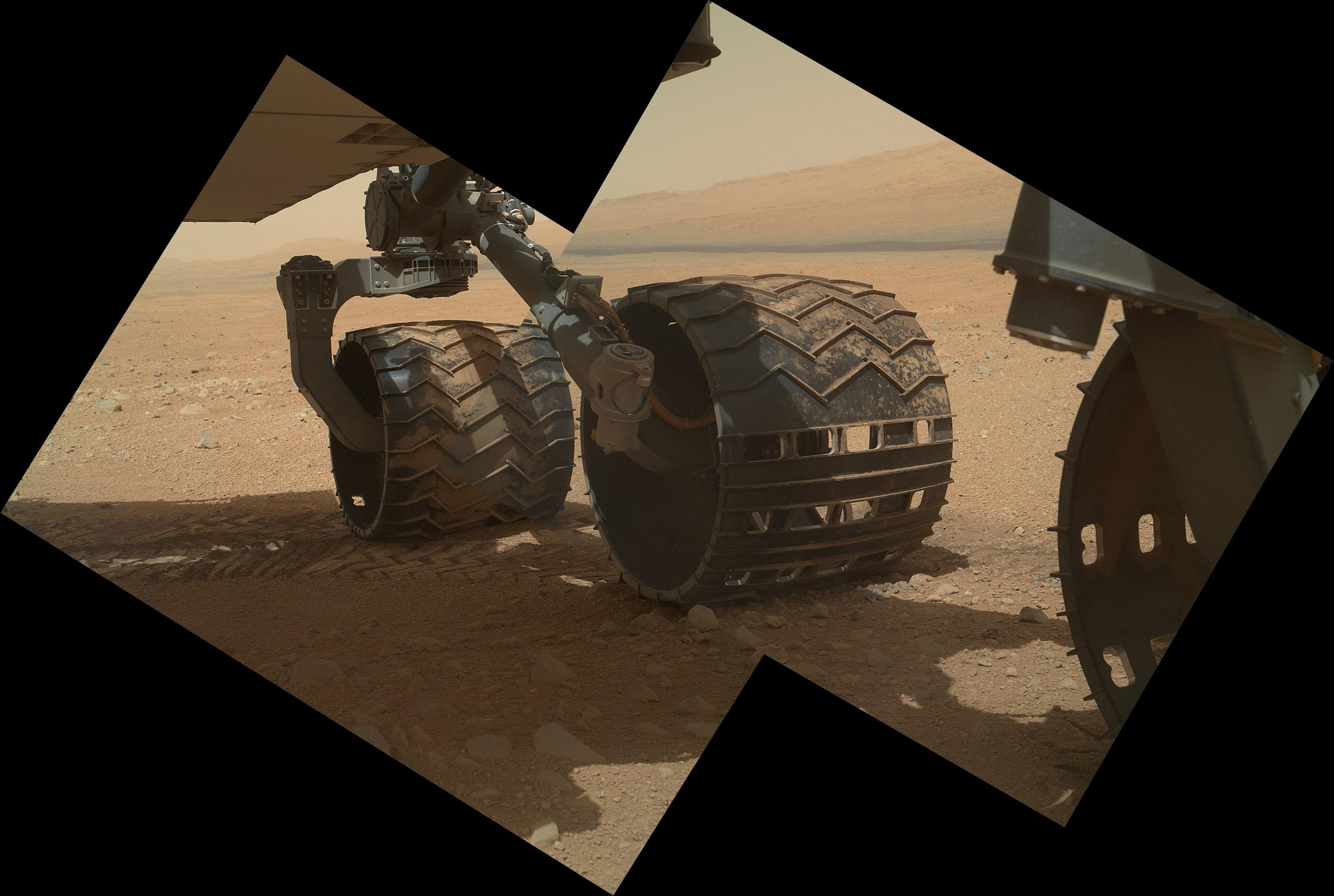
Curiosity's wheels - Aeolis Mons is in the background (MAHLI, September 9, 2012).

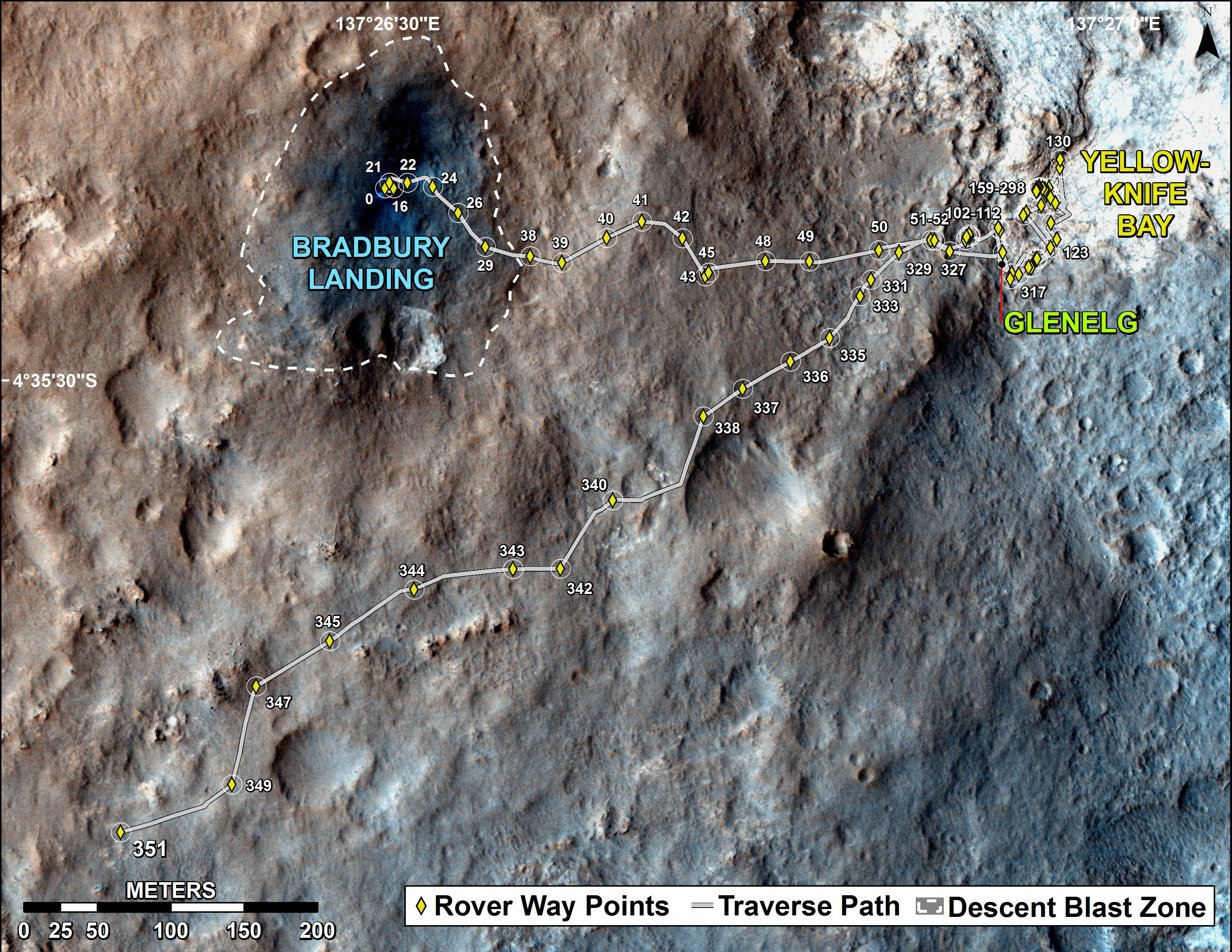
First-Year and First-Mile Traverse Map of the Curiosity rover on Mars (August 1, 2013) (3-D).

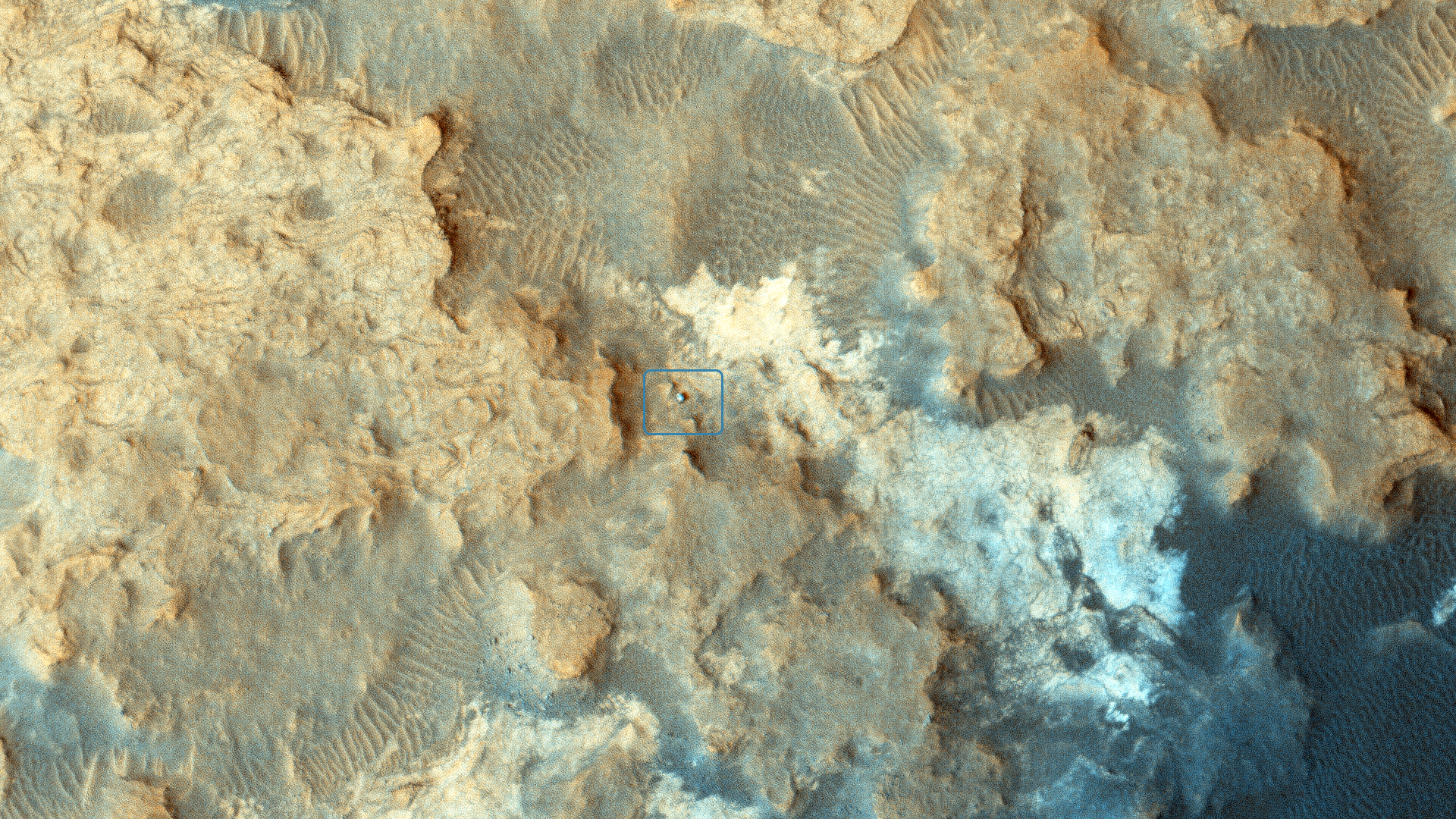
Curiosity (in rectangle) in the Pahrump Hills of Mount Sharp – as viewed from space (MRO; HiRISE; December 13, 2014).

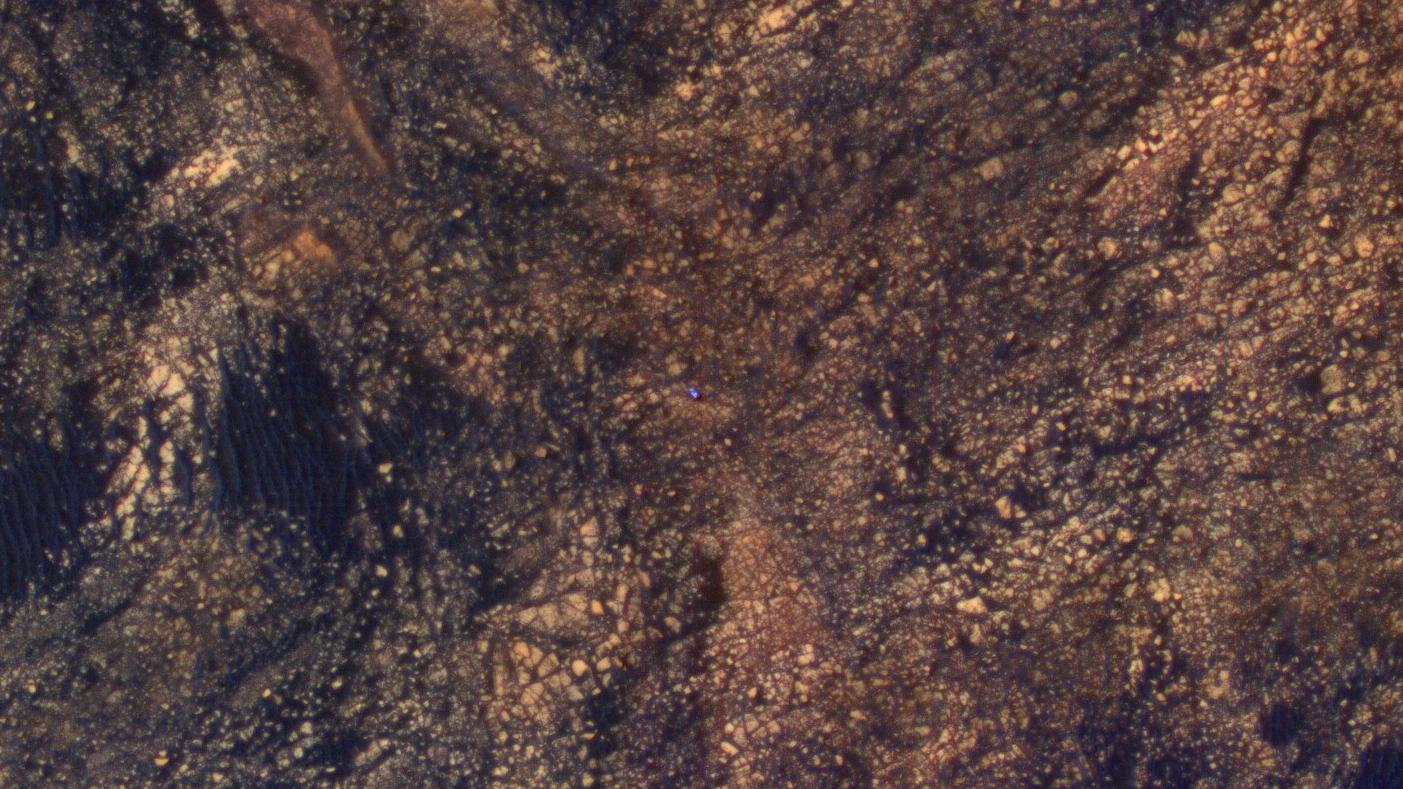
Curiosity rover (center bright blue) on Mount Sharp viewed from orbit (MRO; HiRISE; June 5, 2017).

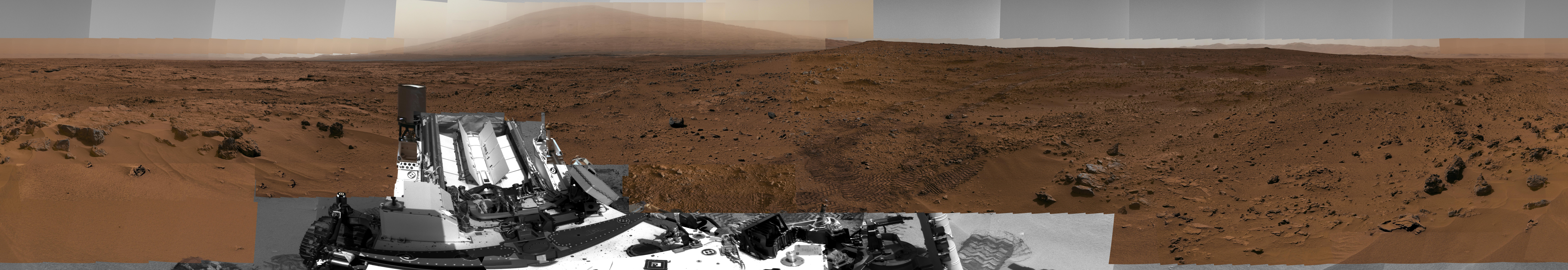
Curiosity's view of the "Rocknest" area – South is center/North at both ends; "Mount Sharp" at SE horizon (somewhat left-of-center); "Glenelg" at East (left-of-center); rover tracks at West (right-of-center) (November 16, 2012; white balanced) (raw color) (interactives).
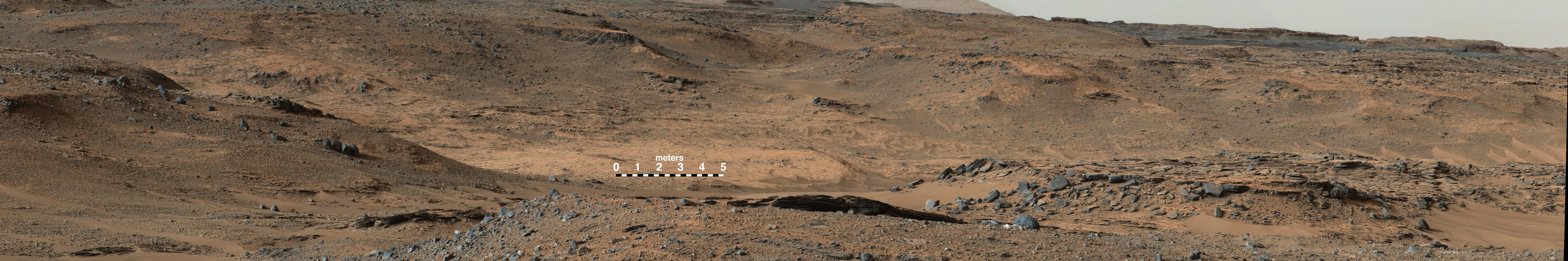
Curiosity's view of "Amargosa Valley" on the slopes of "Mount Sharp" (September 11, 2014; white balanced image).
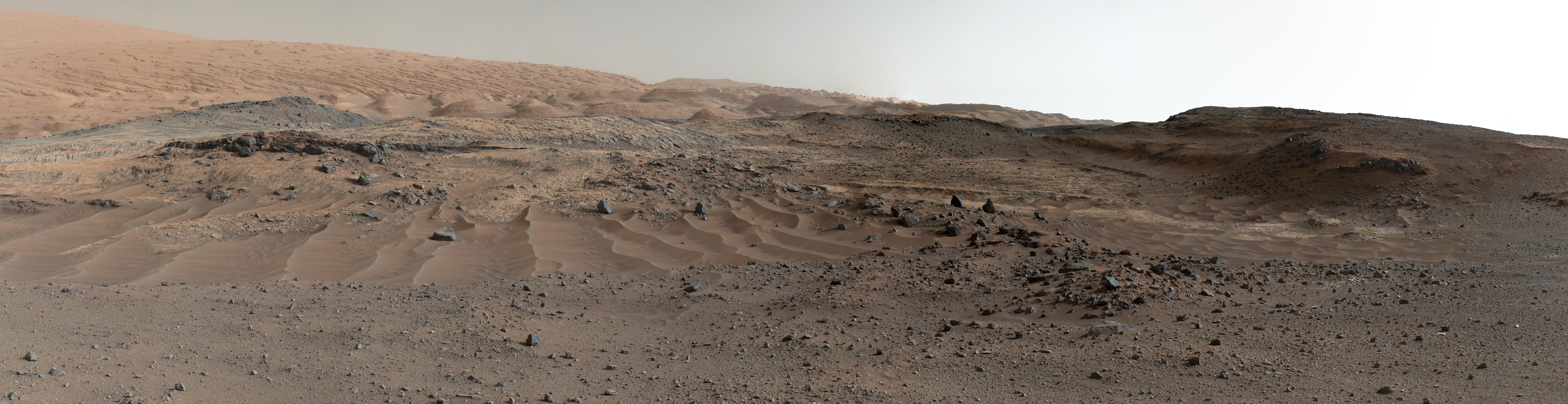
Curiosity's southward-looking view on the slopes of "Mount Sharp" (April 11, 2015).
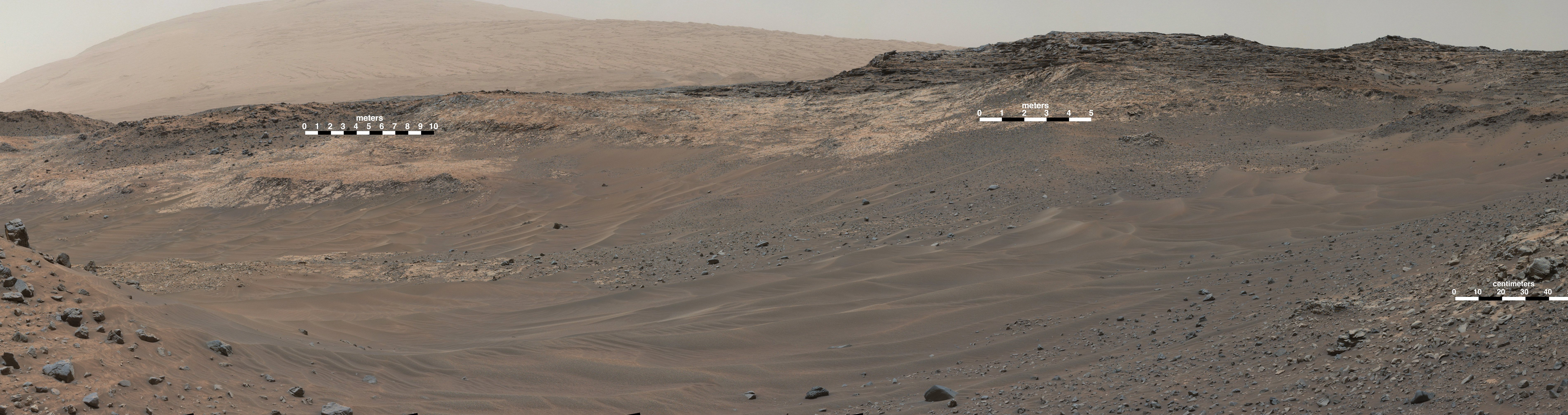
Curiosity's view near "Logan Pass" on the slopes of "Mount Sharp" (May 10, 2015; white balanced image).

== See also ==
- Aeolis quadrangle#Gale Crater – One of a series of 30 quadrangle maps of Mars
- Composition of Mars – Branch of the geology of Mars
- Geology of Mars – Geology of fourth planet from the Sun
- List of craters on Mars
- List of mountains on Mars – Named mountains of Mars
- List of rocks on Mars
- List of tallest mountains in the Solar System
