= N165 =

Rock on Mars

Coronation rock
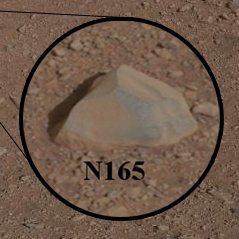
- Coronation rock on Mars – the first target of the ChemCam laser analyzer on the Curiosity rover (August 17, 2012)
- Feature type: Rock
- Coordinates: 4.59°S 137.44°E

N165 (Coronation rock) is a rock on the surface of Aeolis Palus in Gale Crater on the planet Mars near the landing site (Bradbury Landing) of the Curiosity rover. The "approximate" site coordinates are: 4.59°S 137.44°E. On August 19, 2012, the rock was the first target of the rover's laser instrument, ChemCam, which can analyze targets at a distance using a laser and spectrometer. A Twitter feed for the rock was created, featuring an anthropomorphized account of its experiences. Its posts include a humor themed mix of social interaction and Mars content such as "Did you know I was born in a volcano? Basalts like me come from lava. That's why we call it Olympus Mom".

The goal of this initial use of the laser on Mars was to serve as target practice for characterizing the instrument. The rock was primarily selected for its proximity to the rover, rather than any intrinsic scientific value. The rock was lasered thirty times over ten seconds. The mission's investigators thought the rock was a basalt prior to lasing, which was confirmed by preliminary results. The ChemCam team reported positive results; they worked on the instrument for eight years before getting to use it on Mars.

== Images ==
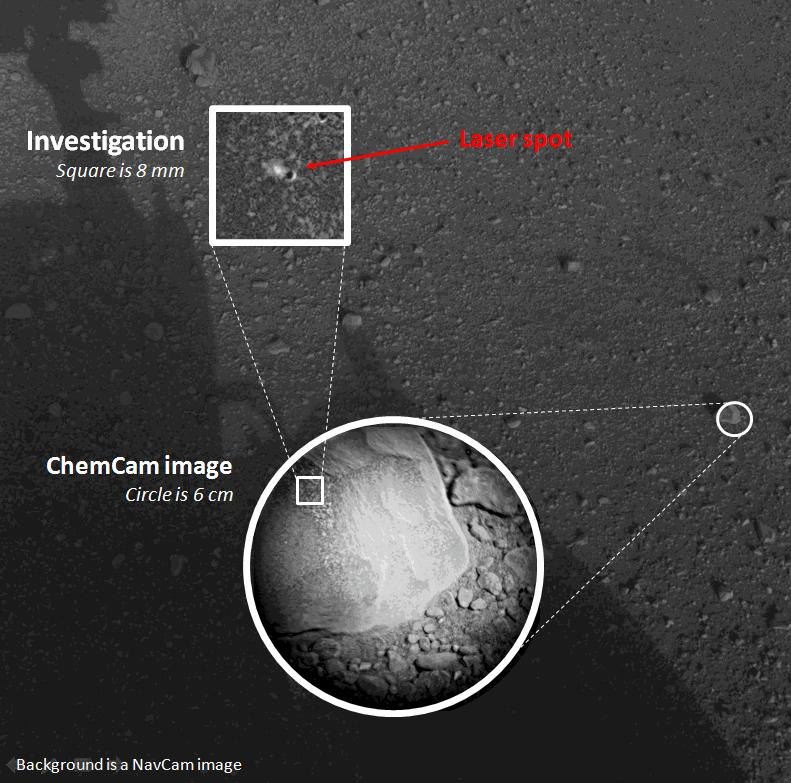
First Laser Test on a Mars Rock, N165, by ChemCam on the Curiosity rover (August 19, 2012).

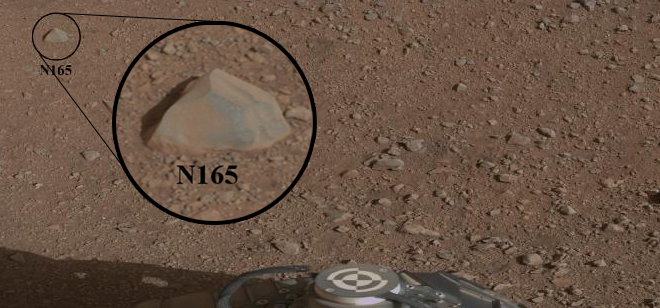
Coronation rock on Mars - first target of the ChemCam laser analyzer on the Curiosity rover (August 19, 2012).

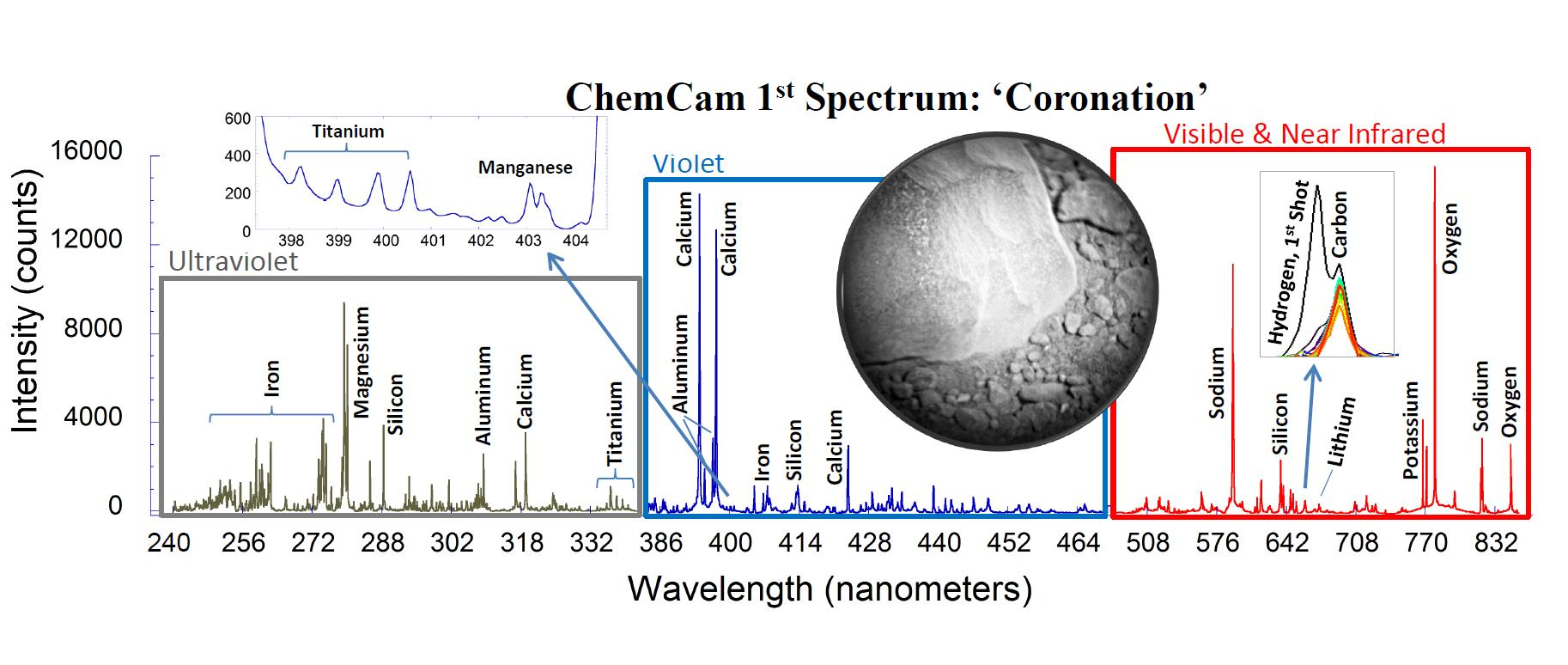
First Laser Spectrum of chemical elements from ChemCam on the Curiosity rover ("Coronation" rock, August 19, 2012).
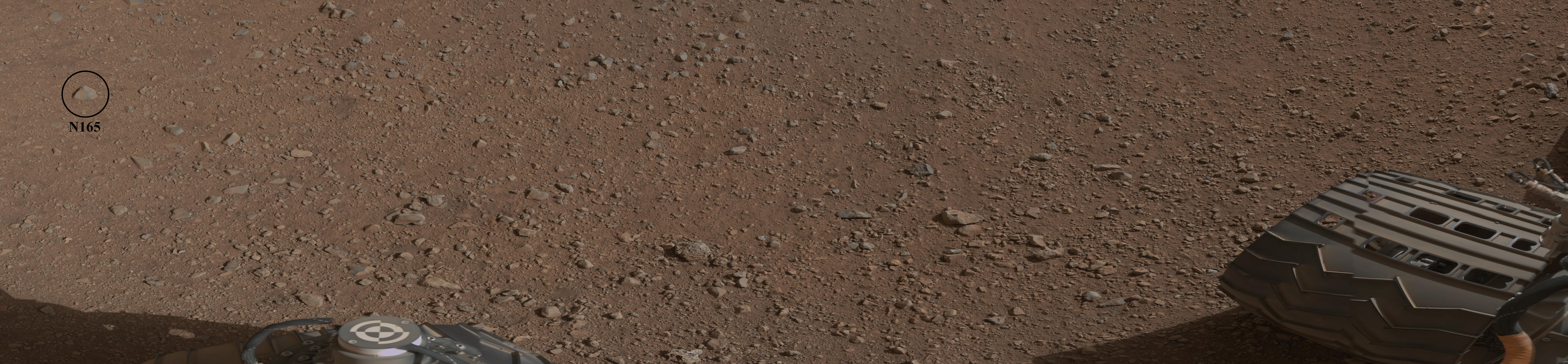
Panorama of rocks near the Curiosity rover - near Bradbury Landing (August 9, 2012).

== See also ==
- Aeolis quadrangle
- Composition of Mars
- Geology of Mars
- List of rocks on Mars
- Timeline of Mars Science Laboratory
