= Jacob Matijevic =

Croatian-born NASA engineer (1947–2012)

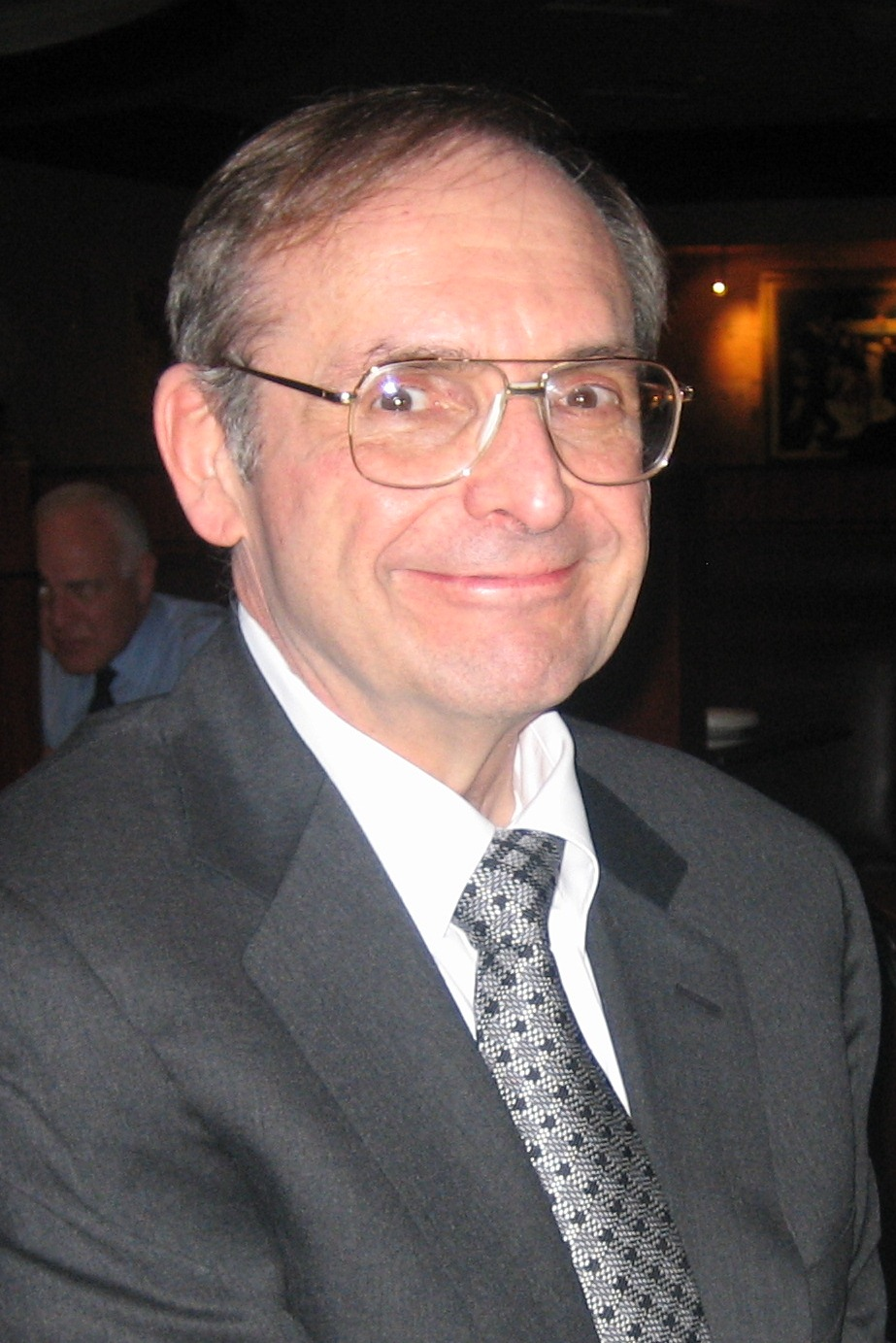
- Born: November 3, 1947; Chicago, Illinois, US
- Died: August 20, 2012 (aged 64)
- Education: Illinois Institute of Technology; University of Chicago (PhD, 1973)
- Known for: NASA Mars rover missions
- Scientific career
- Fields: Astrophysics; Aerospace engineering Planetary science
- Workplaces: NASA, Jet Propulsion Laboratory
- Doctoral advisor: Irving Kaplansky

Jacob Richard Matijevic, also known as "Jake" Matijevic, (3 November 1947 – 20 August 2012) was an American NASA engineer of Croatian origin who worked on Mars Exploration Rovers. Dr. Matijevic was involved in developing the "Sojourner", "Spirit", "Opportunity" and "Curiosity" rovers. For his contributions to the rover projects, NASA named several landmarks on the planet Mars (including "Matijevic Hill" and "Jake Matijevic" rock) after him.

Matijevic was born and grew up in Chicago, Illinois and graduated from Mount Carmel High School. In 1969, he received a bachelor's degree in mathematics from the Illinois Institute of Technology, and, in 1973, earned a Ph.D. degree in mathematics from the University of Chicago under the supervision of Irving Kaplansky.

In 1981, Matijevic began working at the Jet Propulsion Laboratory (JPL) in Pasadena, California, as a control systems engineer. In 1986, he worked in the telerobotics field and later, in 1992, began work with the Mars Sojourner rover. This rover was delivered to Mars by the Pathfinder spacecraft in 1996.

Afterwards, Matijevic helped develop the "Spirit" and "Opportunity" rovers that began exploring Mars in 2004. He also helped develop the "Curiosity" rover that landed on Mars in August 2012, just two weeks before his death.

After his death, NASA decided to name a Mars hill, "Matijevic Hill", encountered by the "Opportunity" rover, and also a Mars rock, "Jake Matijevic", encountered by the "Curiosity" rover, in his honor for his many contributions to the Mars rover projects over the years.

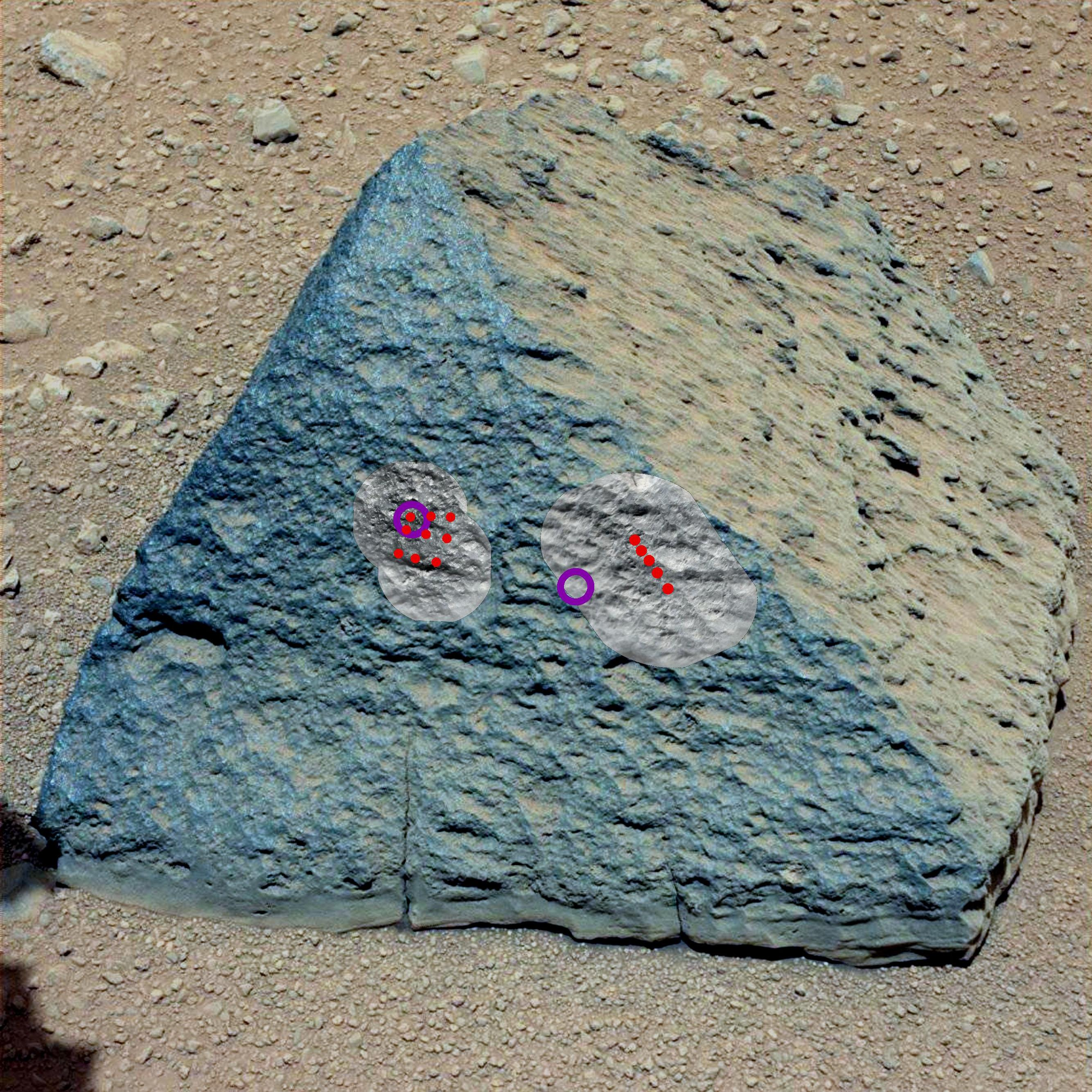
"Jake Matijevic" rock on Mars - a target of the APSX and ChemCam instruments on the Curiosity rover (September 22, 2012).

== See also ==
- Jake Matijevic (rock)
- List of rocks on Mars
- Matijevic Hill
- Mori–Nagata theorem
