= Jake Matijevic (rock) =

Rock on Mars

Jake Matijevic Rock
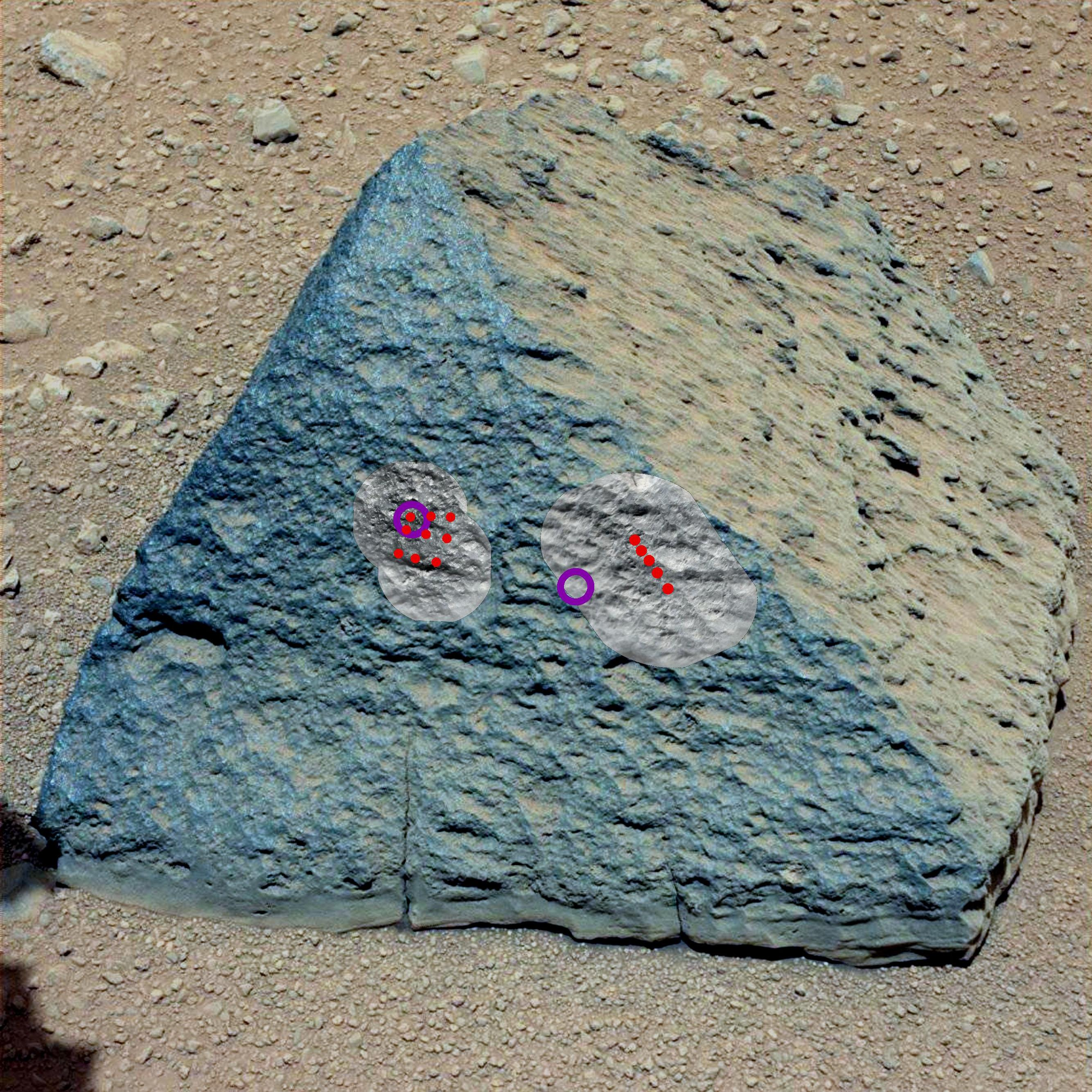
- An annotated image of Jake Matijevic rock on Mars - a target of the APXS and ChemCam instruments on the Curiosity rover (September 22, 2012). The red dots are where the ChemCam hit it with its laser; the purple circles indicate where the APXS targeted its view.
- Feature type: Rock
- Coordinates: 4.59°S 137.44°E

Jake Matijevic (or Jake M) is a pyramidal rock on the surface of Aeolis Palus, between Peace Vallis and Aeolis Mons ("Mount Sharp"), in Gale crater on the planet Mars. The approximate site coordinates are: 4.59°S 137.44°E.

The rock was encountered by the Curiosity rover on the way from Bradbury Landing to Glenelg Intrigue in September 2012 and measures about 25 cm (9.8 in) height and 40 cm (16 in) width.

The rock was named by NASA after Jacob Matijevic (1947–2012), a mathematician-turned-rover-engineer, who played a critical role in the design of the six-wheeled rover, but died just days after the Curiosity rover landed in August 2012. Matijevic was the surface operations systems chief engineer for the Mars Science Laboratory Project and the project's Curiosity rover. He was also a leading engineer for all of the previous NASA Mars rovers including Sojourner, Spirit and Opportunity.

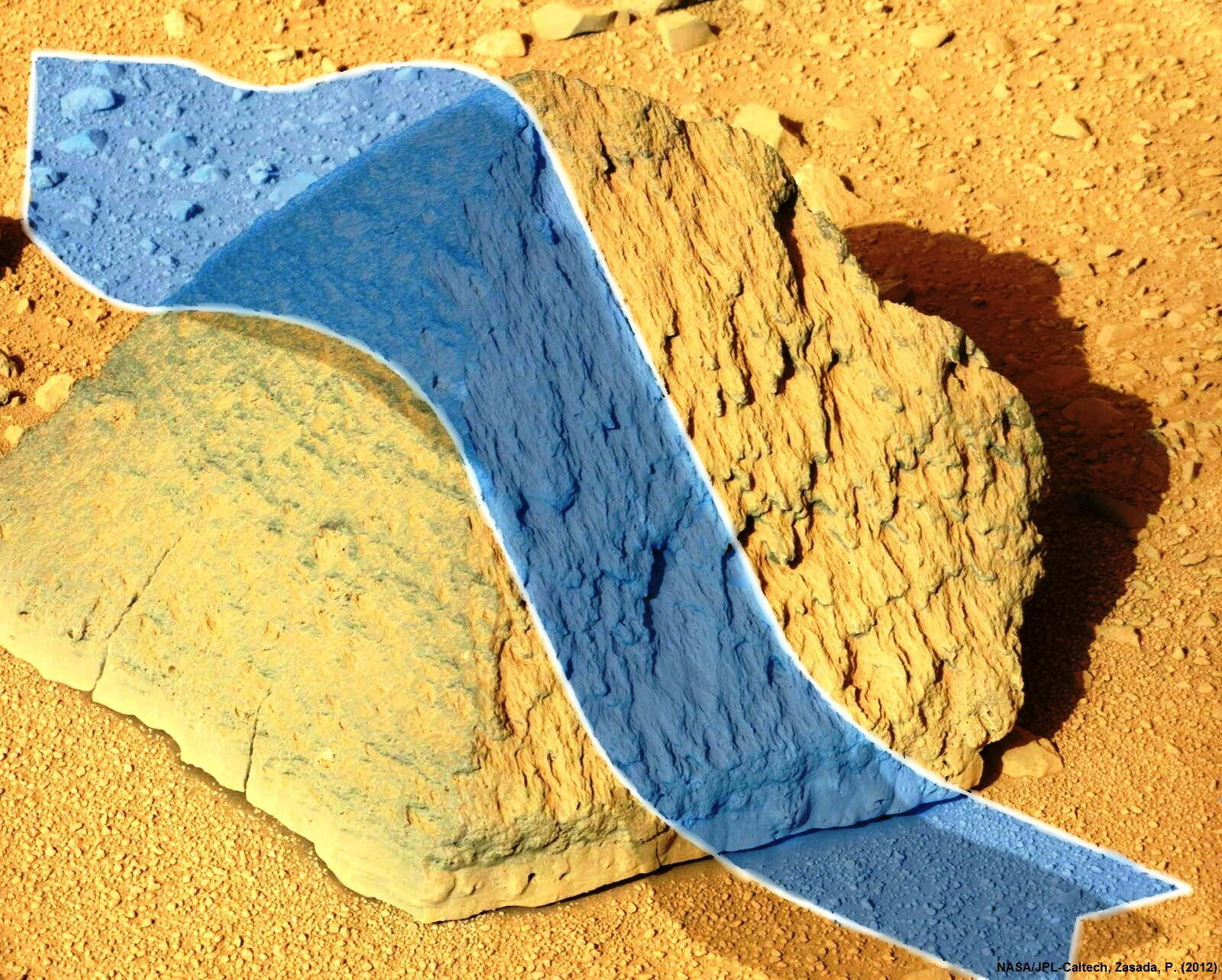
Erosional formation of Jake M rock by wind.

The rover team determined the rock to be a suitable target for the first use of Curiosity's contact instruments, the Mars Hand Lens Imager (MAHLI) and the Alpha particle X-ray spectrometer (APXS).

Analytical studies, performed on the rock by the Curiosity rover in October 2012, suggest the Jake M rock is an igneous rock but found to be high in elements consistent with feldspar, such as sodium, aluminum and potassium, and lower concentrations of magnesium, iron and nickel than other such rocks previously found on Mars. The mineral content and elemental abundance indicates Jake M rock may be a mugearite, a sodium rich oligoclase-bearing basaltic trachyandesite. Igneous rocks similar to the Jake M rock are well known but occur rarely on Earth. On Earth, such rocks form when magma, usually found in volcanoes, rises to the surface, cools and partially solidifies with certain chemical elements, while the warmer liquid magma portion becomes enriched with the left-behind elements. By remarkable coincidence, the Martian locality Glenelg is also the name of a small settlement in north-west Scotland that is 25 km (16 mi) east of type locality for mugearite at Mugeary on the island of Skye. The Jake M rock is a ventifact with a volcanic fabric. Its pyramidal shape was formed by eolian drifted grains of sand. The little cavities on its surface were formed by the blast-effect, which is caused by different flow dynamics at the micro-relief. On the surface one could see the marks of the main wind direction, by which Jake M was formed. On September 27, 2013, NASA scientists reported that Jake M rock was a mugearite and very similar to terrestrial mugearite rocks.

Curiosity rover examining Jake Matijevic rock (September 22, 2012).

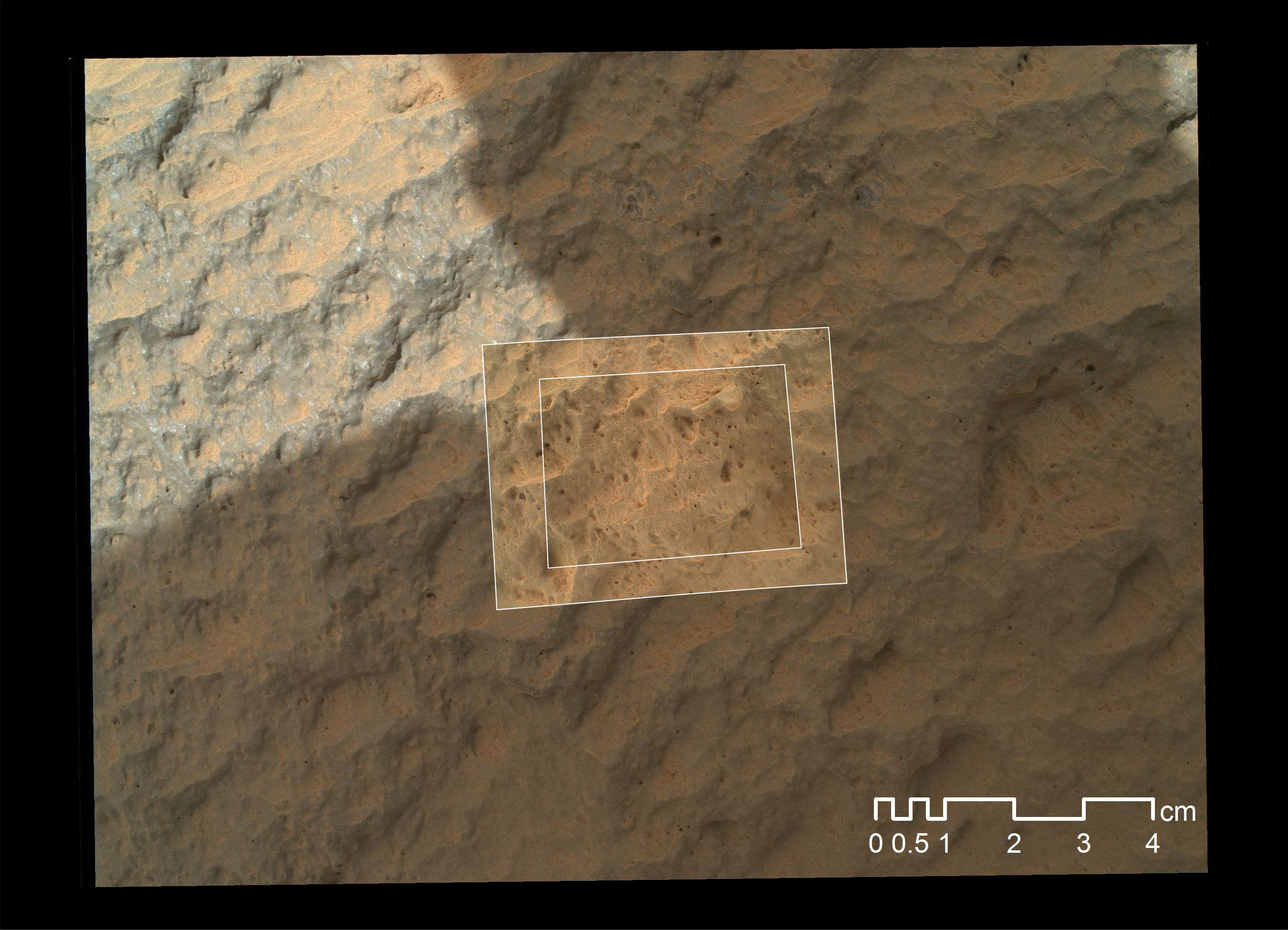
MAHLI Close-up of Jake Matijevic Rock

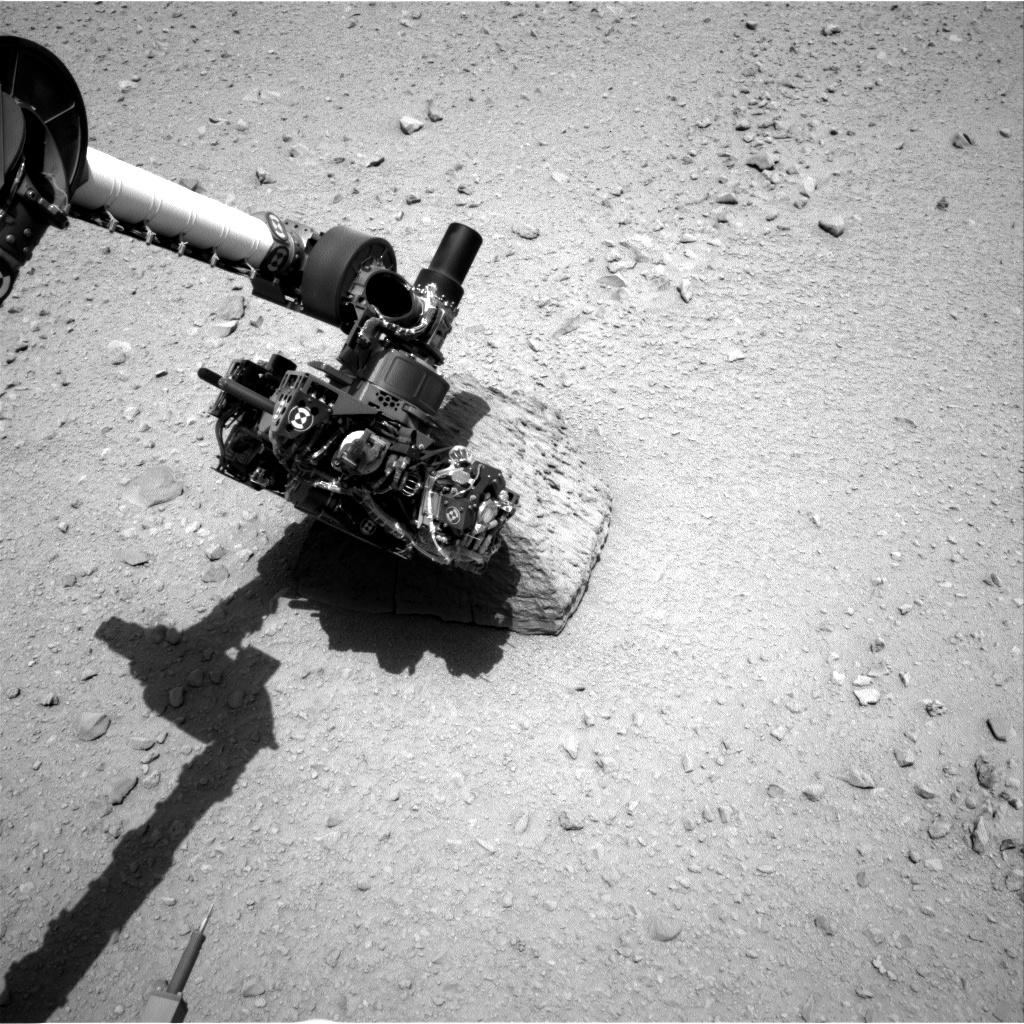
APXS Analyzes Jake Matijevic Rock

== See also ==
- Aeolis quadrangle
- Composition of Mars
- Geology of Mars
- List of rocks on Mars
- Matijevic Hill
- Mugearite
- Timeline of Mars Science Laboratory
