= Matijevic Hill =

Hill on Mars

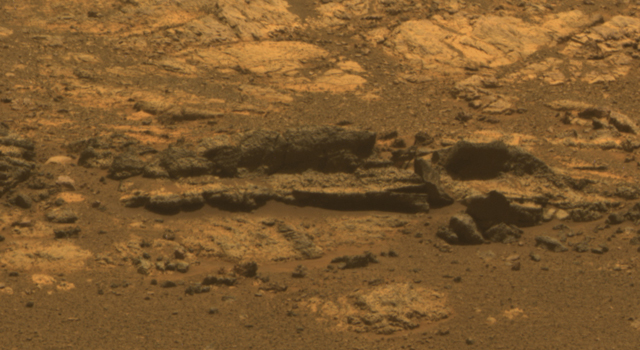
- Matijevic Hill near Endeavour Crater on the planet Mars (3D image).
- Location: Endeavour Crater, Meridiani Planum
- Coordinates: 2.22923°S 5.35068°W
- Discoverer: Opportunity Rover
- Eponym: Jacob "Jake" Matijevic (1947-2012), NASA Engineer.

Matijevic Hill, named after American NASA engineer Jacob "Jake" Matijevic (1947 - 2012), is a hill located on "Cape York", itself on the western rim of Endeavour Crater lying within the Margaritifer Sinus quadrangle (MC-19) region of the planet Mars. It was discovered by the Opportunity rover, and named by NASA on September 28, 2012. The "approximate" site coordinates are: 2.22923°S 5.35068°W.

The hill includes a rock outcrop called Kirkwood, where Opportunity found a concentration of small spherical features. It also includes an area where clay minerals have been detected from orbiter observations.

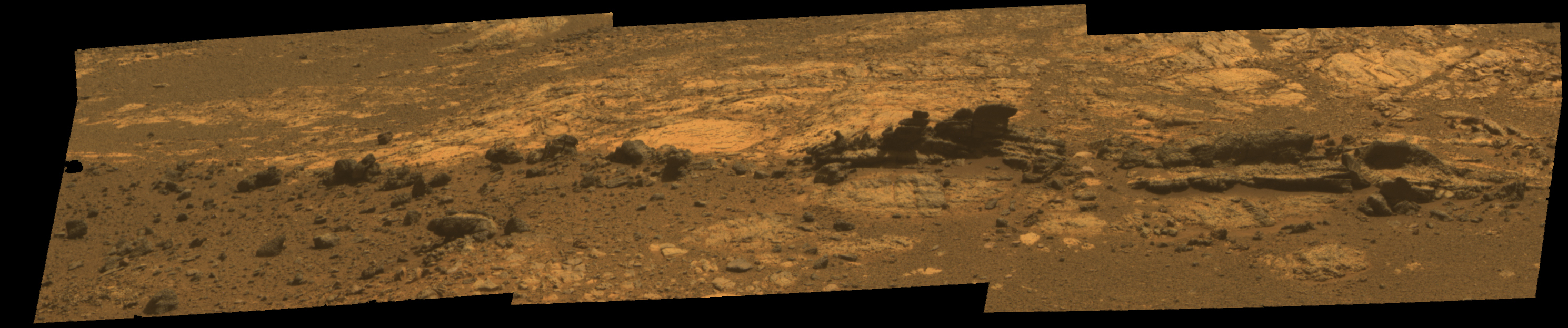
Matijevic Hill near Endurance Crater on the planet Mars (3D image).

== See also ==
- Composition of Mars
- Geography of Mars
- Jake Matijevic (rock)
- List of rocks on Mars
- List of surface features of Mars imaged by Opportunity
