= Mugeary =

Coordinates: 57.369°N 6.252°W

Mugeary: Scottish Gaelic: Mùigearraidh
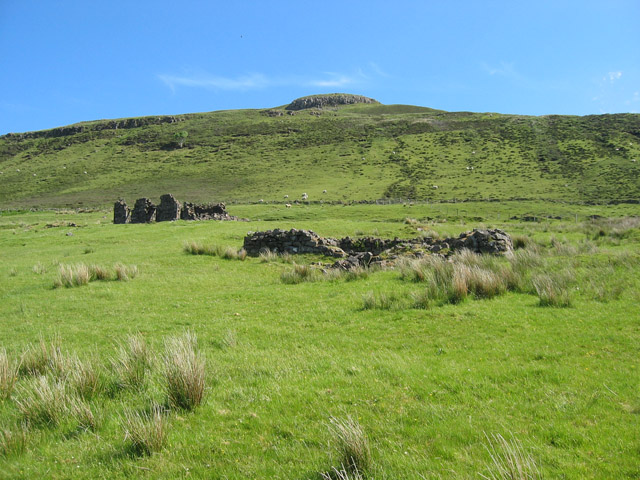
- Ruined cottages below Stròc-bheinn

- Location within the Isle of Skye
- OS grid reference: NG4438
- Council area: Highland
- Lieutenancy area: Ross and Cromarty
- Country: Scotland
- Sovereign state: United Kingdom
- Post town: PORTREE
- Postcode district: IV51
- Police: Scotland
- Fire: Scottish
- Ambulance: Scottish
- UK Parliament: Ross, Skye and Lochaber
- Scottish Parliament: Ross, Skye and Inverness West

Mugeary (Scottish Gaelic: Mùigearraidh) is a farm or croft and former settlement on the island of Skye, Scotland. Located 4 kilometres (2 1/2 miles) southwest of Portree, it is known as the location where the basaltic rock mugearite was first identified. The Gaelic name is derived from Old Norse and probably means "narrow field".

== Location ==
Mugeary lies 150 m (490 ft) above sea level on a west-facing slope of the hill Stròc-bheinn, north of the Glenmore River. The Glenmore flows into the River Snizort, which passes the settlement of Carbost and joins the sea at the head of the innermost arm of Loch Snizort Beag.

Although only 4 km (2 1/2 mi) southwest of Portree, the island of Skye's main town, Mugeary is about double this distance away by road. There is a track across the Bealach Mòr (English: big pass) to the north of Stròc-bheinn which leads to the forestry plantation above the main A87 road south of Portree. According to the Skye and Lochalsh Local Plan of 2007 the Glenmore valley has potential both for further afforestation and also wind power developments in the vicinity of Mugeary.

To the south the landscape is dominated by the forestry plantation of Glen Tungadal through which flows the upper reaches of the River Snizort, providing beats for salmon and trout during the fishing season.

Mugeary's elevated situation in the path of prevailing westerly winds leads to a cool and damp climate. Average annual temperatures are c. 8 °C (46 °F) and annual rainfall exceeds 2,200 mm (87 in).

== History ==
The ruins surrounding the extant croft suggest a more substantial settlement prior to the Clearances, which devastated many parts of Skye, and a well-documented case from the 1850s in the parish of Snizort exists.

The RCAHMS have identified an old field system northwest of the existing farm buildings that predates 1881 and a second record describes the area as a crofting "township".

== Mugearite ==
Mugearite is a type of oligoclase-bearing basalt, comprising olivine, apatite, and opaque oxides. The main feldspar in mugearite is oligoclase. It was first identified by Alfred Harker in 1904 from formations in the vicinity of Mugeary, making this remote spot the rock's "type locality". It occurs in a variety of locations worldwide, including outcrops near Dunedin in New Zealand and in the Hawaiian Islands.

In 2012 the Mars exploration vehicle Curiosity discovered a small rock, named "Jake Matijevic" by NASA scientists, which appears to be made of mugearite. The rock was discovered by Curiosity en route to a destination called Glenelg about 200 m (660 ft) from "Jake" in Gale crater. Coincidentally, the village of Glenelg lies on the west coast of mainland Scotland, just 40 km (25 mi) from Mugeary itself.
