= Chemistry and Camera complex =

Suite of remote sensing instruments for the Curiosity rover

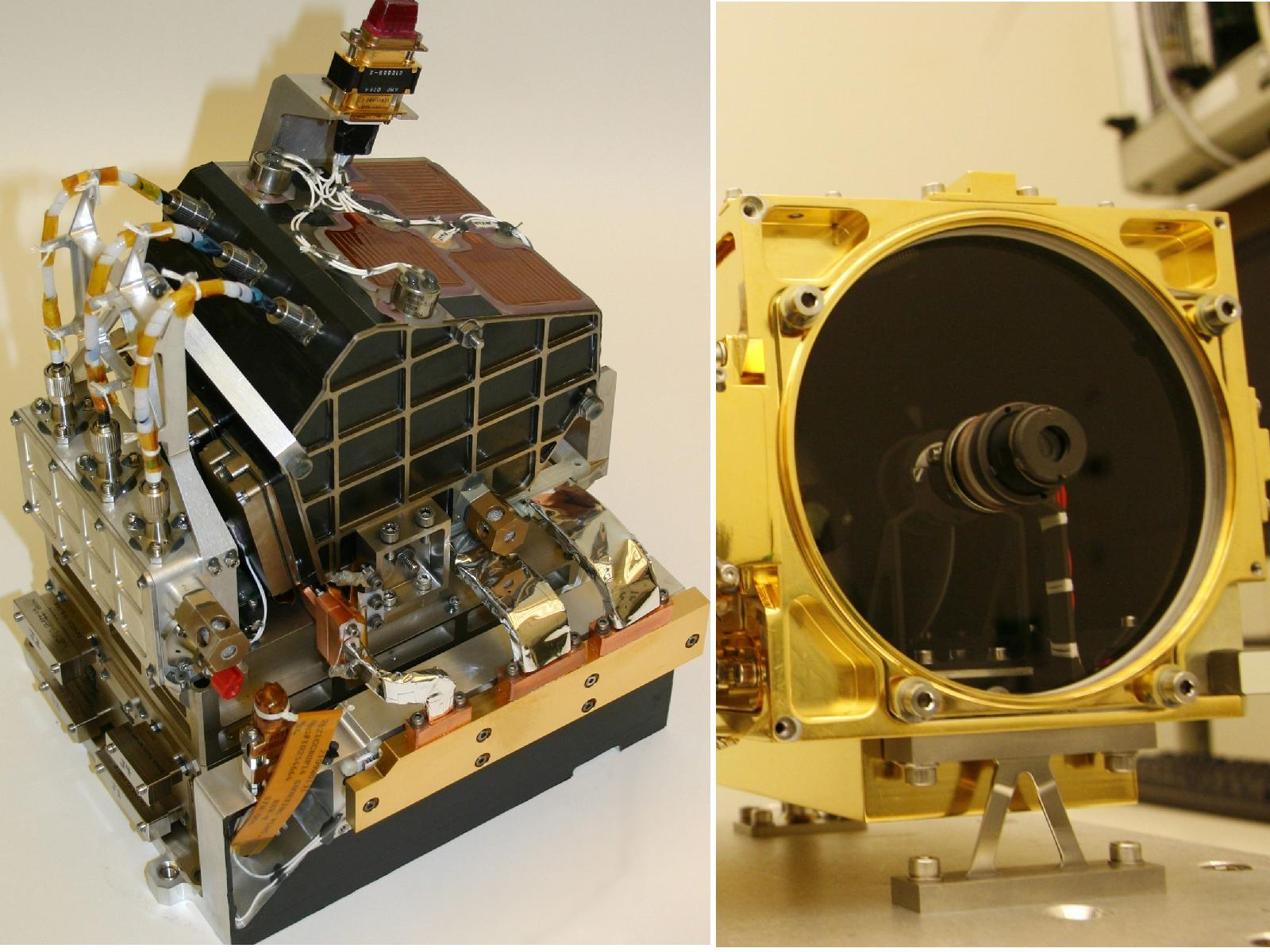
The internal spectrometer (left) and the laser telescope (right) for the mast

Chemistry and Camera complex (ChemCam) is a suite of remote sensing instruments on Mars for the Curiosity rover. As the name implies, ChemCam is actually two different instruments combined as one: a laser-induced breakdown spectroscopy (LIBS) and a Remote Micro Imager (RMI) telescope. The purpose of the LIBS instrument is to provide elemental compositions of rock and soil, while the RMI will give ChemCam scientists high-resolution images of the sampling areas of the rocks and soil that LIBS targets. The LIBS instrument can target a rock or soil sample from up to 7 m (23 ft) away, vaporizing a small amount of it with about 30 5-nanosecond pulses from a 1067 nm infrared laser and then observing the spectrum of the light emitted by the vaporized rock.

== Overview ==
ChemCam has the ability to record up to 6,144 different wavelengths of ultraviolet, visible, and infrared light. Detection of the ball of luminous plasma is done in the visible, near-UV and near-infrared ranges, between 240 nm and 800 nm. The first initial laser testing of the ChemCam by Curiosity on Mars was performed on a rock, N165 ("Coronation" rock), near Bradbury Landing on August 19, 2012.

Using the same collection optics, the RMI provides context images of the LIBS analysis spots. The RMI resolves 1 mm (0.039 in) objects at 10 m (33 ft) distance, and has a field of view covering 20 cm (7.9 in) at that distance. The RMI has also been used to take images of distant geologic features and landscapes.

The ChemCam instrument suite was developed by the Los Alamos National Laboratory and the French CESR laboratory. The flight model of the mast unit was delivered from the French CNES to Los Alamos National Laboratory.

== Instrumentation ==
=== Laser Induced Breakdown Spectroscopy ===
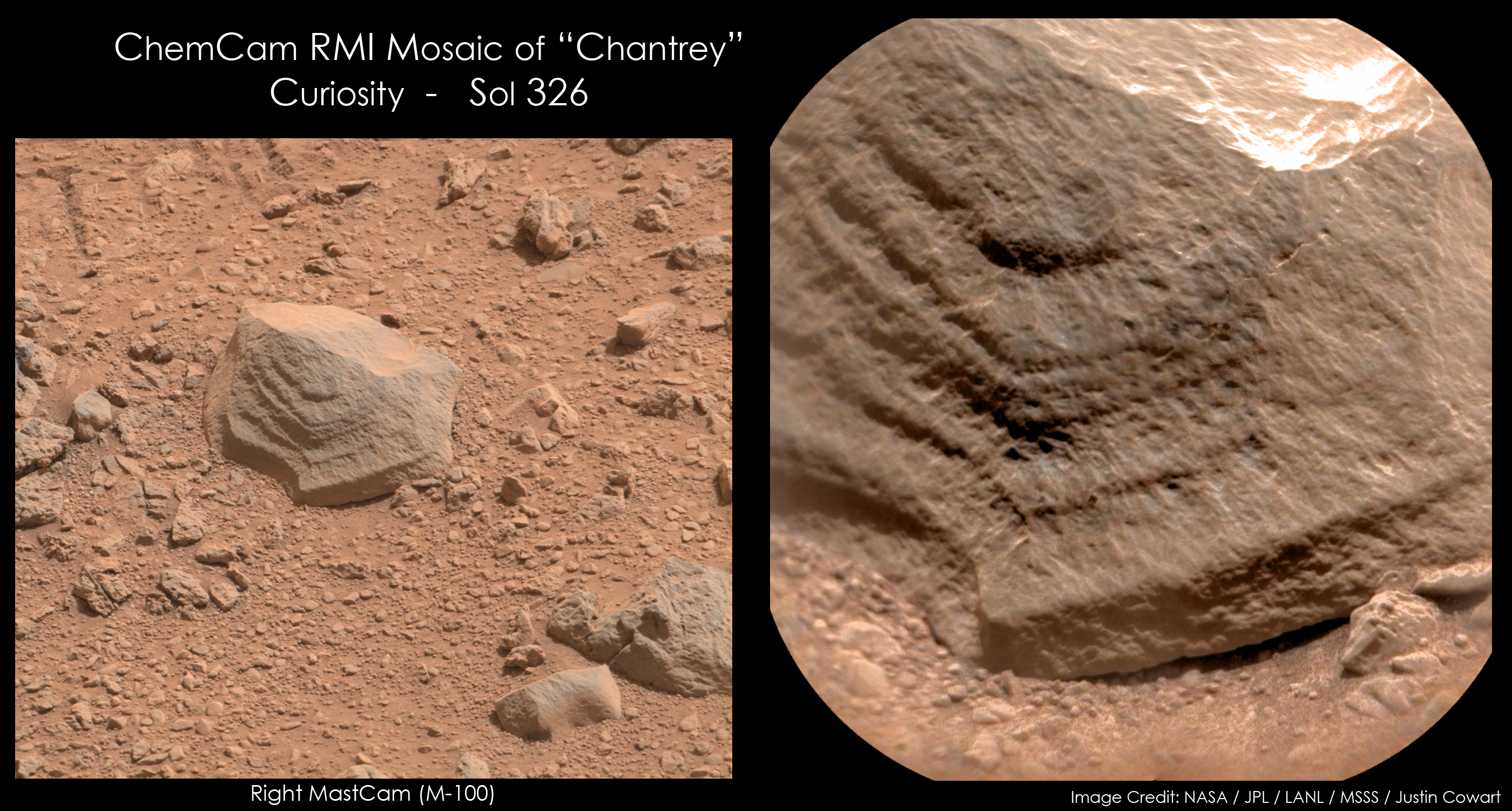
Five frame ChemCam RMI mosaic (right) of the rock "Chantrey," colorized using the right MastCam (M-100) image (left).

ChemCam marks the first use of Laser Induced Breakdown Spectroscopy (LIBS) as part of a planetary science mission. The laser is positioned on the mast of the Curiosity rover and focused by the telescope that also resides on the mast, while the spectrometer is housed in the rover's body. Typically, the laser fires 30 shots at a single point, gathering spectroscopic readings from the vaporized rock for each laser shot, and samples multiple points on a chosen target. For bedrock observations, the first 5 shots of a point are discarded as they are considered to be contaminated by Martian dust. The remaining shots of one point are averaged together for chemical composition calculations. It is common for there to be 9 or 10 points of analysis on any given target, but this is not always the case. Some targets have as few as 4 points while some targets have 20 points.

=== Remote Micro-Imager ===
The Remote Micro-Imager is primarily used to capture high-resolution, black and white images of ChemCam targets for context and documentation. Usually, an image of the target of interest is captured before and after the laser is fired. Often, the laser makes "LIBS pits" that can be visible in the RMI to show where the laser sampled specifically on a particular target. The resolution of the RMI is higher than the black and white navigational camera (navcam) and the color mast cameras (mastcam).

==== Long Distance Imaging ====
The RMI is primarily used to obtain close-up images of targets sampled by ChemCam, but it can also be used to gather high-resolution images of distant outcrops and landscapes. The RMI has a higher spatial resolution than the mastcam M100 camera, which is a color camera also capable of imaging nearby objects or distant geologic features. The RMI has been used by the mission for reconnaissance of up-coming terrain as well as imaging distant features such as the rim of Gale Crater.

== Scientific contributions ==
ChemCam has been used, in conjunction with other instruments of the Curiosity rover, to make advancements in understanding the chemical composition of rocks and soils on Mars. LIBS makes it possible to detect and quantify the major oxides: SiO_{2}, Al_{2}O_{3}, FeO_{T}, MgO, TiO_{2}, CaO, Na_{2}O, and K_{2}O of bedrock targets. There are distinguishable geologic units determined from orbital analyses that have been confirmed by averaged bedrock compositions determined from ChemCam and other instruments aboard Curiosity. The identification is based on multivariate PLS and PCA models classified using SIMCA with calibration models made using "The Unscrambler" software. ChemCam has also quantified soil chemistry. ChemCam has seen two distinct soil types at Gale crater: a fine-grained mafic material that is more representative of global Martian soils or dust and a coarse-grained felsic material that originates from local Gale crater bedrock. ChemCam has the capability to measure minor or trace elements such as lithium, manganese, strontium, and rubidium. ChemCam has measured MnO up to 25 wt% in fracture fills that suggests Mars was once a more oxygenating environment.

== Images ==
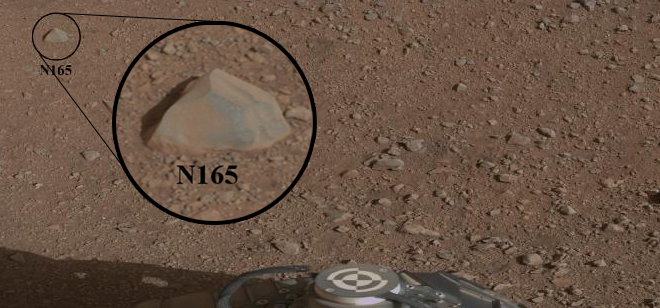
First target on Mars of the ChemCam laser analyzer on the Curiosity rover ("Coronation" rock, August 19, 2012).

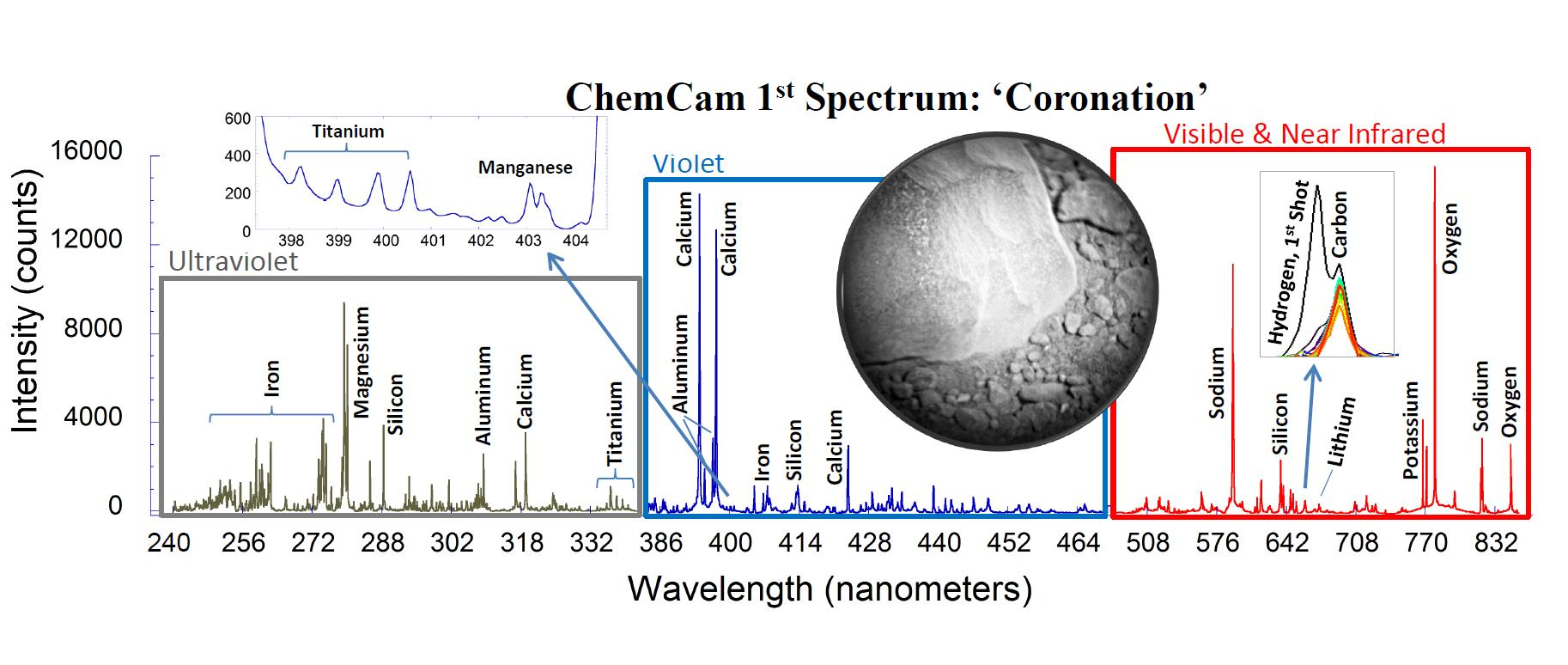
First laser spectrum of chemical elements from ChemCam on Curiosity ("Coronation" rock, August 19, 2012).

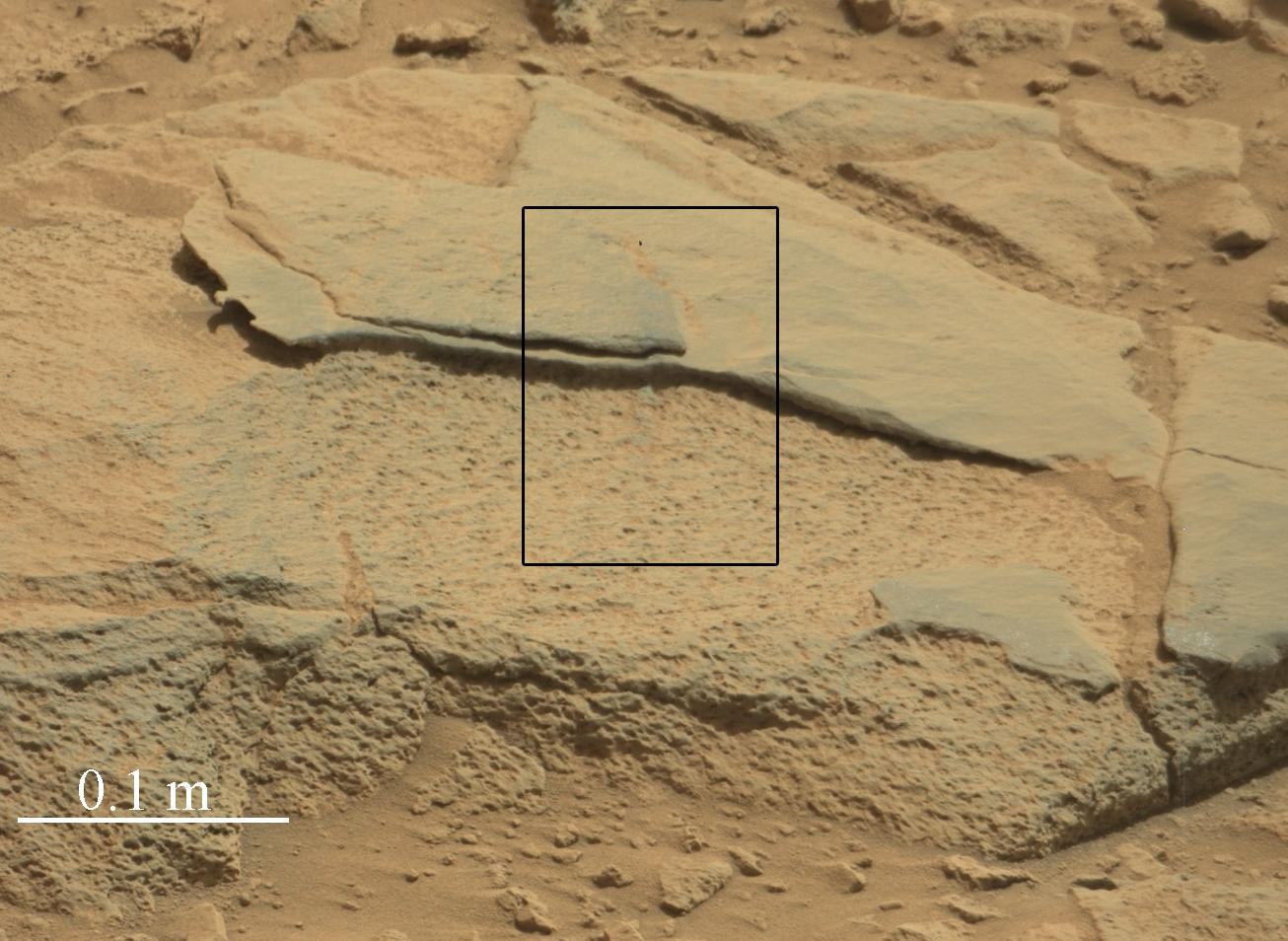
Target on Mars of the ChemCam laser analyzer on Curiosity (closeup) ("Ithaca" rock, October 30, 2013).

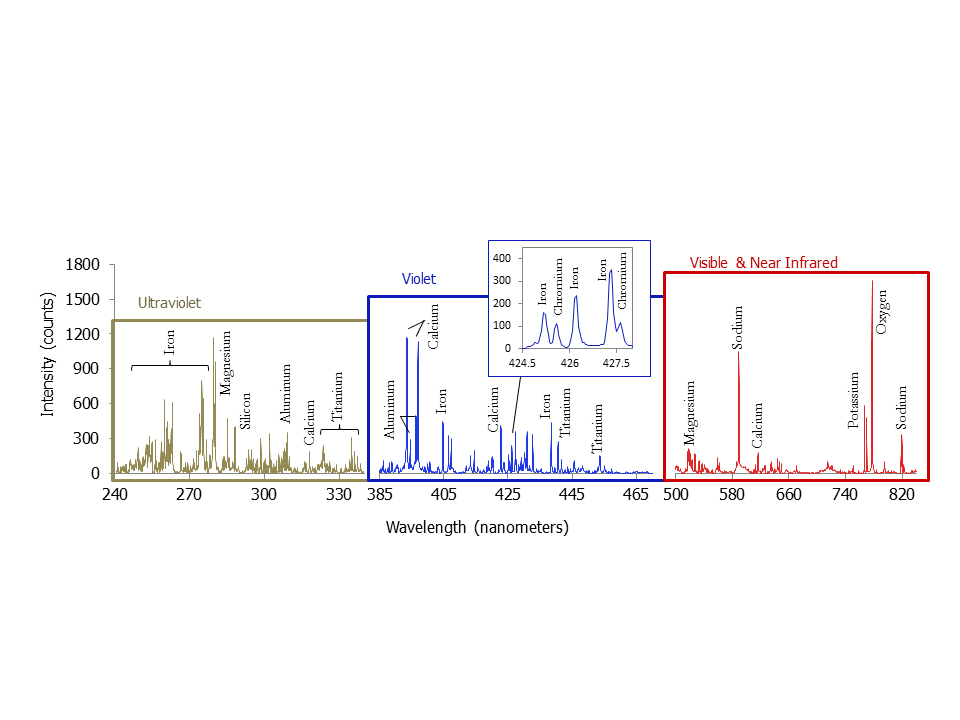
Laser spectrum of chemical elements from ChemCam on Curiosity ("Ithaca" rock, October 30, 2013).

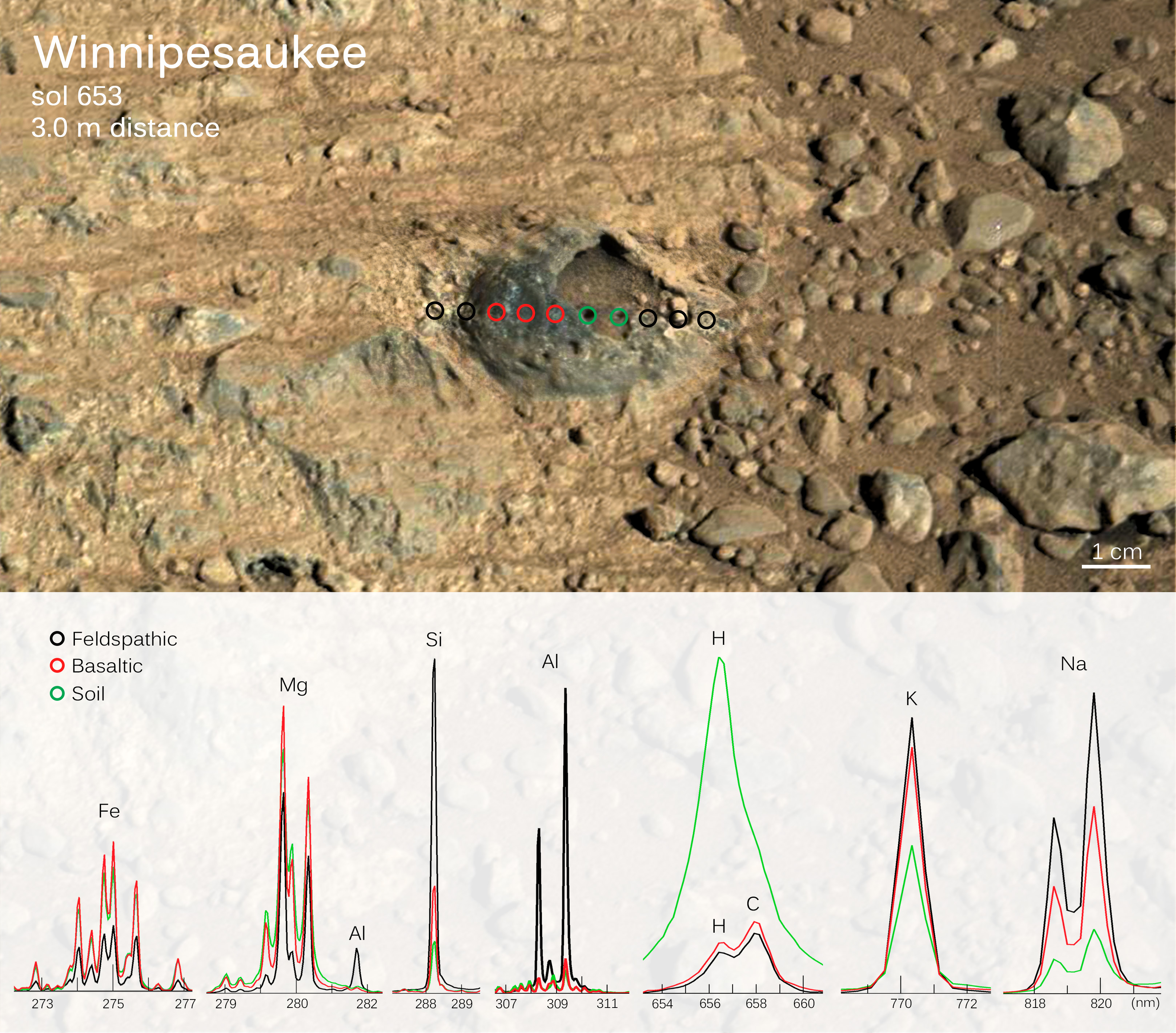
Target on Mars of the ChemCam laser analyzer on Curiosity ("Winnipesaukee" rock, June 8, 2014).

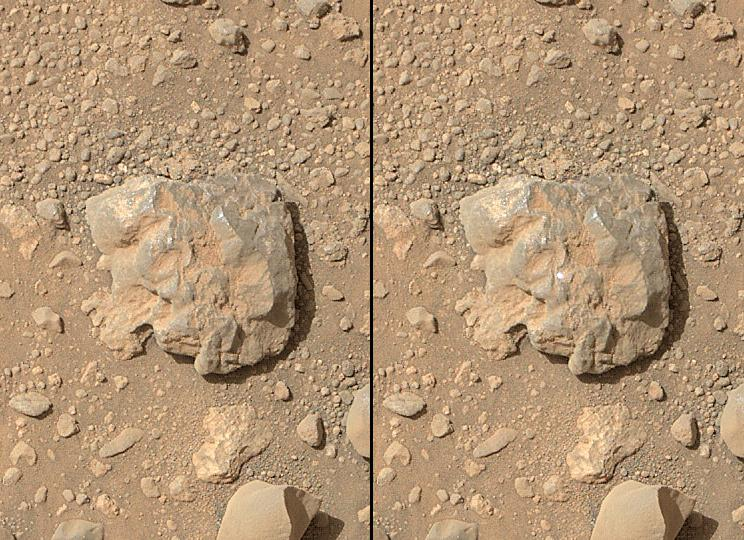
First laser spark imaged on Mars by Curiosity ("Nova" rock; July 12, 2014; video (01:07)).

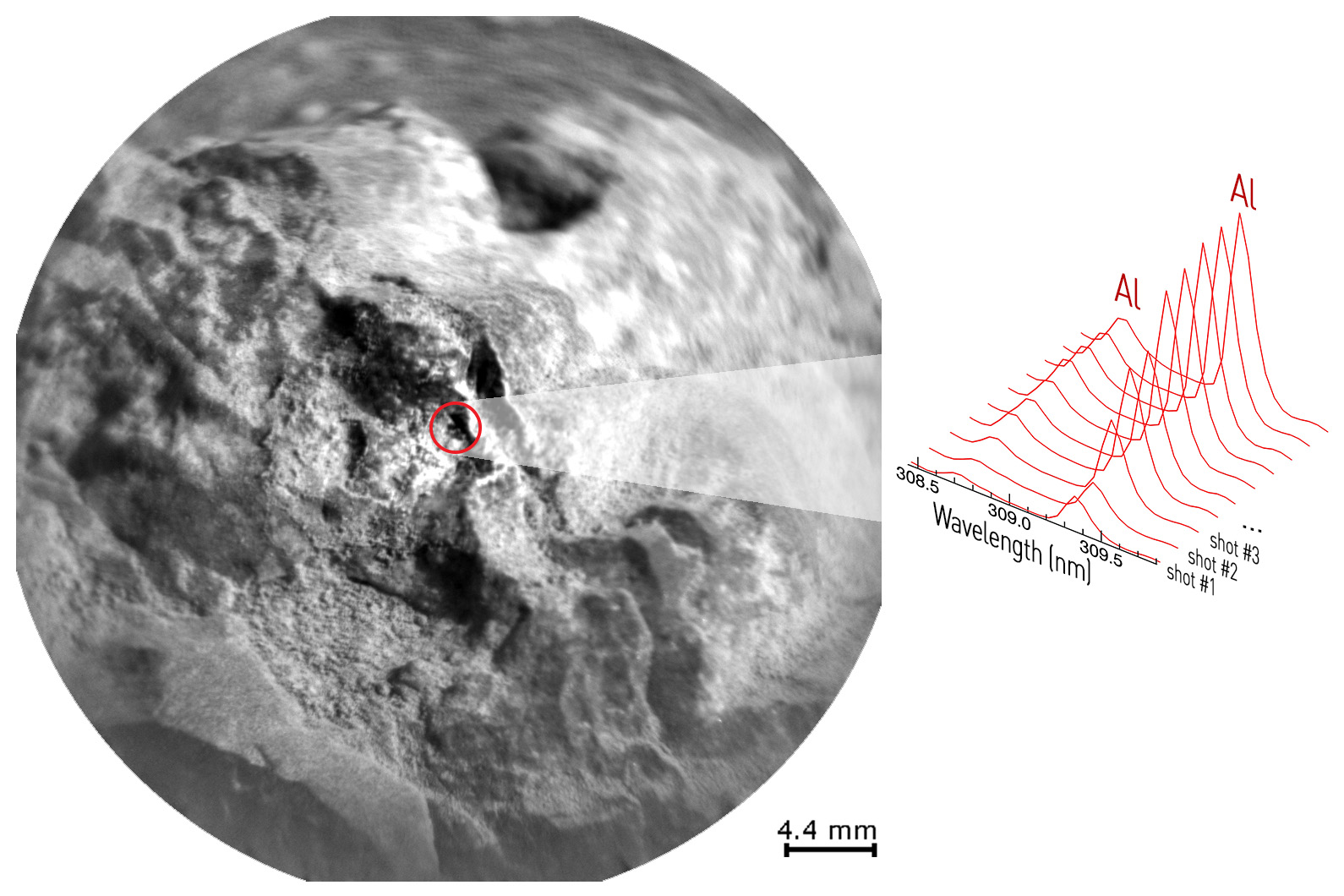
Laser spectrum of chemical elements from ChemCam by Curiosity ("Nova" rock; July 12, 2014).

== See also ==
- Composition of Mars
- Exploration of Mars
- Geology of Mars
- Mars Science Laboratory
- Scientific information from the Mars Exploration Rover mission
- SuperCam
- Timeline of Mars Science Laboratory
