= Aeolis Palus =

Palus on Mars

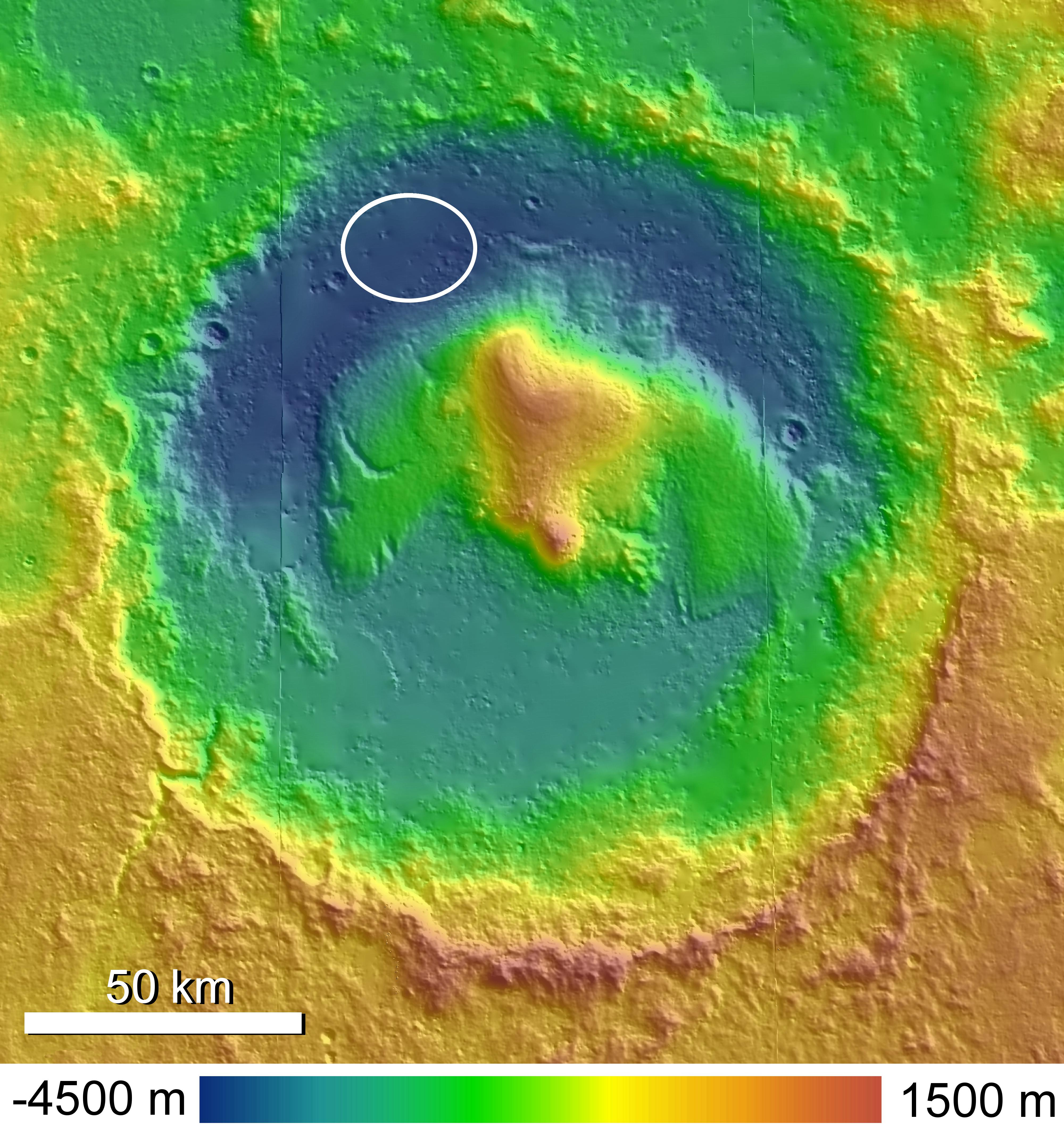
- Map of Gale Crater with Aeolis Mons rising from the middle of the crater. The Curiosity rover landing ellipse is shown on the northwestern crater floor, named Aeolis Palus.
- Coordinates: 4.47°S 137.42°E

Aeolis Palus is a plain between the northern wall of Gale crater and the northern foothills of Aeolis Mons (Mount Sharp) on Mars. It is located at 4.47°S 137.42°E.

The NASA Mars Science Laboratory mission landed the Curiosity rover on Aeolis Palus in August 2012. Curiosity spent two (Earth) years exploring the plain as it drove towards Aeolis Mons. The rover left the plain in September 2014 when it reached the mountain's foothills.

== Spacecraft exploration ==
On August 5, 2012, at 10:32 p.m. PDT/mission time (August 6, 2012, at 5:32 UTC), mission control at JPL received a signal from the NASA Curiosity rover that it had successfully landed in "Yellowknife" Quad 51 of Aeolis Palus. The rover's mission is to explore the surface area of Gale Crater focusing first near its landing site on Aeolis Palus and then venturing into the nearby foothills of Aeolis Mons (unofficially, "Mount Sharp") to investigate its geological features and strata.

On September 26, 2013, NASA scientists reported the Mars Curiosity rover detected "abundant, easily accessible" water (1.5 to 3 weight percent) in soil samples at the Rocknest region of Aeolis Palus in Gale Crater. In addition, NASA reported the rover found two principal soil types: a fine-grained mafic type and a locally derived, coarse-grained felsic type. The mafic type, similar to other martian soils and martian dust, was associated with hydration of the amorphous phases of the soil. Also, perchlorates, the presence of which may make detection of life-related organic molecules difficult, were found at the Curiosity rover landing site (and earlier at the more polar site of the Phoenix lander) suggesting a "global distribution of these salts". NASA also reported that Jake M rock, a rock encountered by Curiosity on the way to Glenelg, was a mugearite and very similar to terrestrial mugearite rocks.

On December 9, 2013, NASA reported that, based on evidence from Curiosity studying Aeolis Palus, Gale Crater contained an ancient freshwater lake which could have been a hospitable environment for microbial life.

On December 16, 2014, NASA reported detecting, based on measurements by the Curiosity rover, an unusual increase, then decrease, in the amounts of methane in the atmosphere of the planet Mars; in addition, organic chemicals were detected in powder drilled from a rock by the Curiosity rover. Also, based on deuterium to hydrogen ratio studies, much of the water at Gale Crater on Mars was found to have been lost during ancient times, before the lakebed in the crater was formed; afterwards, large amounts of water continued to be lost.

== Bradbury Landing ==
"Bradbury Landing" is a named location on Aeolis Palus. It is where the Curiosity rover landed. The coordinates of the landing site are: 4.5895°S 137.4417°E. The landing site location was named for science fiction author Ray Bradbury. NASA announced the name on Bradbury's 92nd birthday, August 22, in honor of the author who died a few months earlier on June 5, 2012. Michael Meyer, NASA program scientist for Curiosity, said "This was not a difficult choice for the science team. Many of us and millions of other readers were inspired in our lives by stories Ray Bradbury wrote to dream of the possibility of life on Mars." Bradbury wrote a collection of stories called The Martian Chronicles in the 1940s. The Curiosity team left a message on Twitter "In tribute, I dedicate my landing spot on Mars to you, Ray Bradbury. Greetings from Bradbury Landing!" NASA released a video of Bradbury reading his poem "If Only We Had Taller Been".

== Images ==
Curiosity rover landing site in Aeolis Palus and surroundings — first 360 color panorama (August 8/10vid, 2012).

In honor of the naming of Bradbury Landing, NASA released a video of Ray Bradbury reading his poem, "If Only We Had Taller Been".

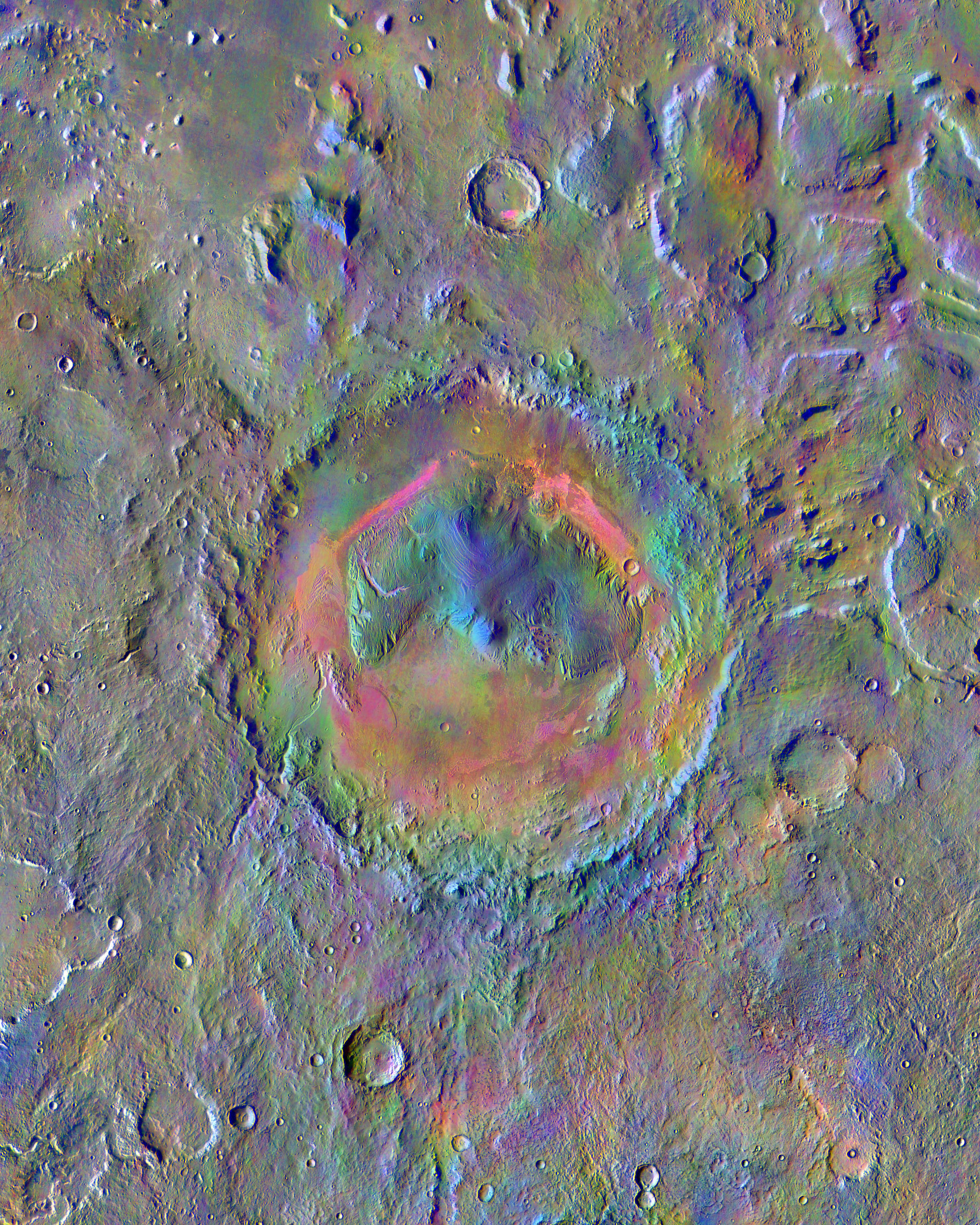
Gale crater - surface materials (false colors; THEMIS; 2001 Mars Odyssey).

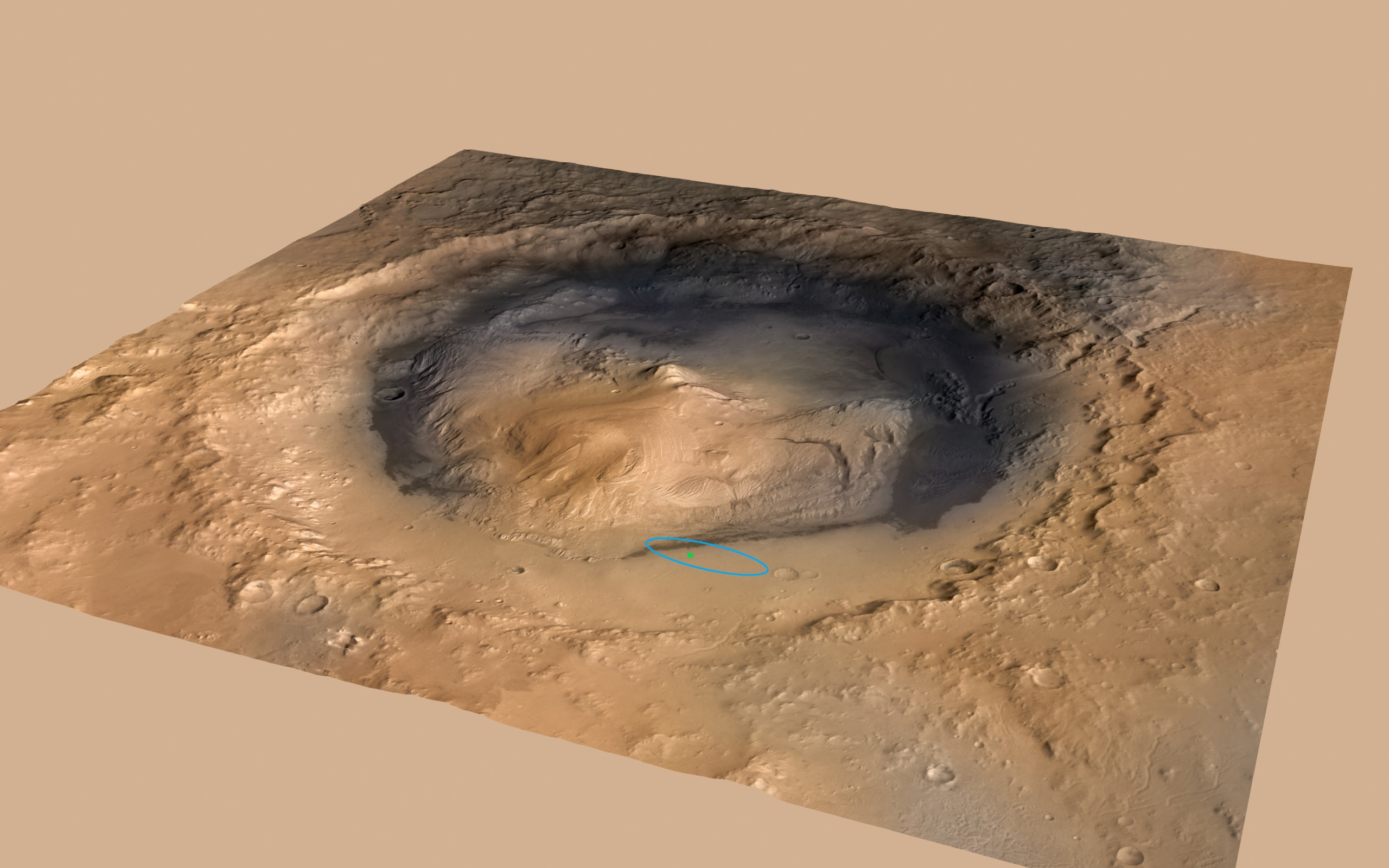
Aeolis Mons rises from the middle of Gale Crater - Green dot marks the Curiosity rover landing site in Aeolis Palus.

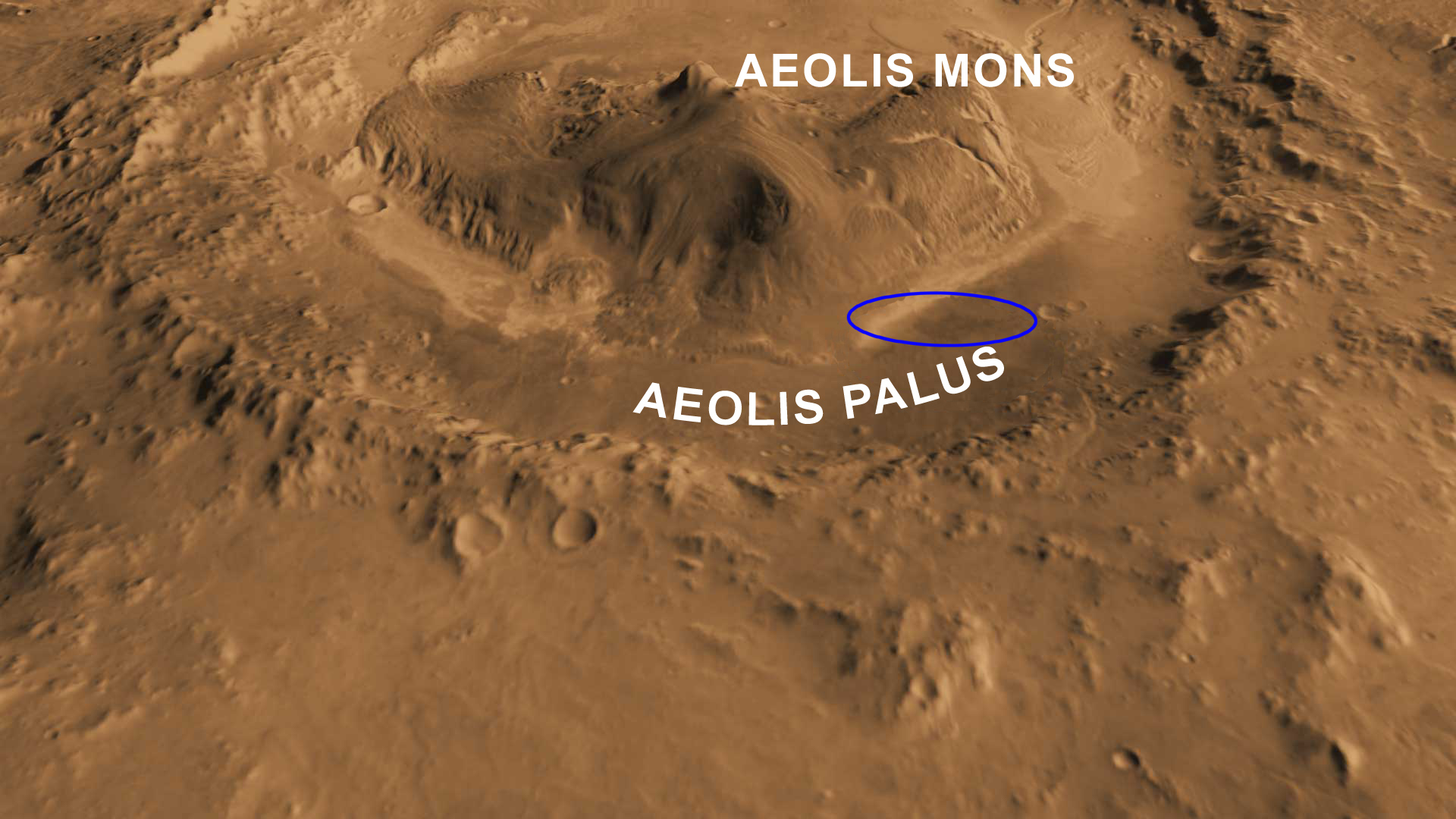
Gale Crater - Landing site is within Aeolis Palus near Aeolis Mons ("Mount Sharp") - North is down.

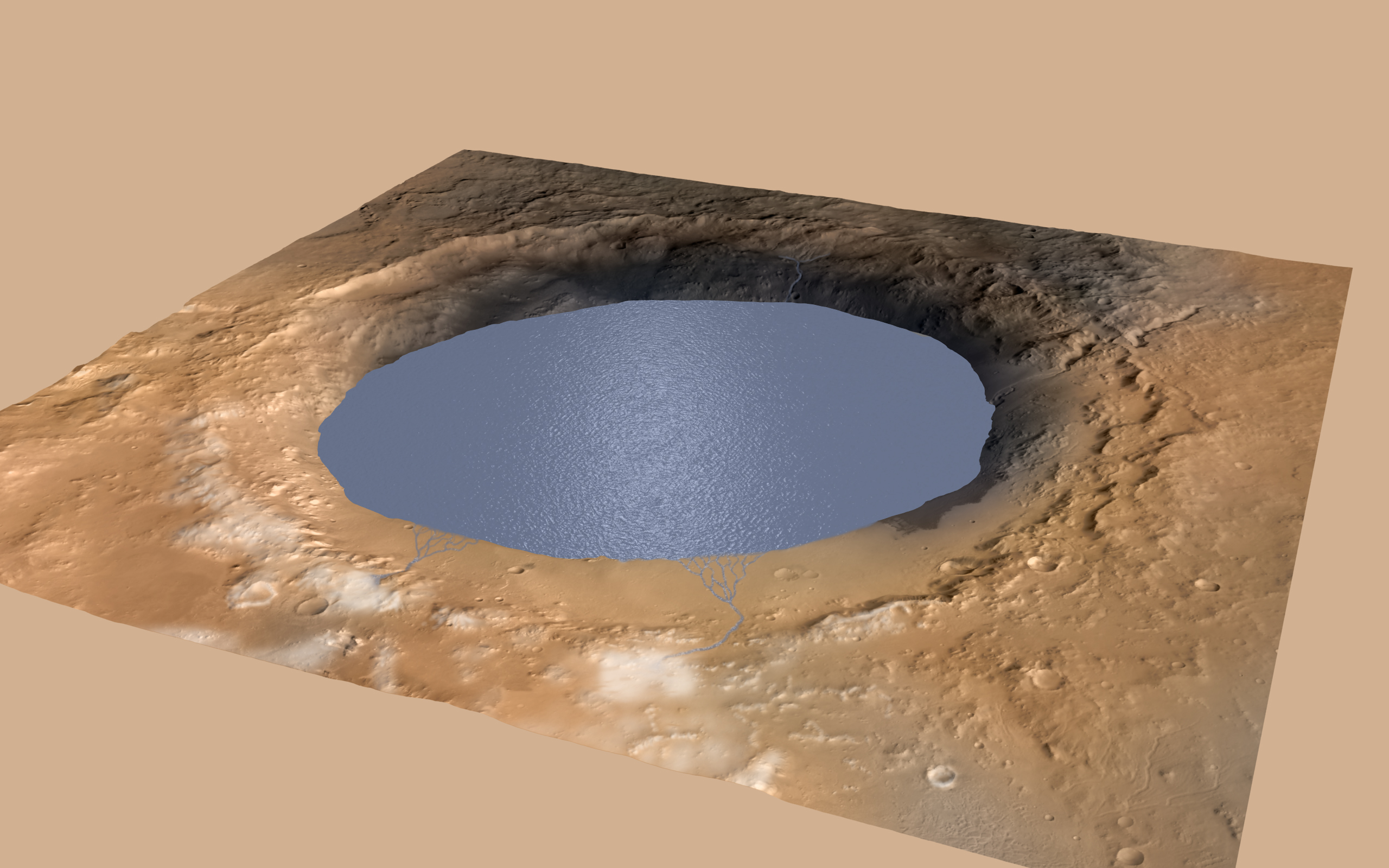
Ancient Lake fills Gale Crater on Mars (simulated view).

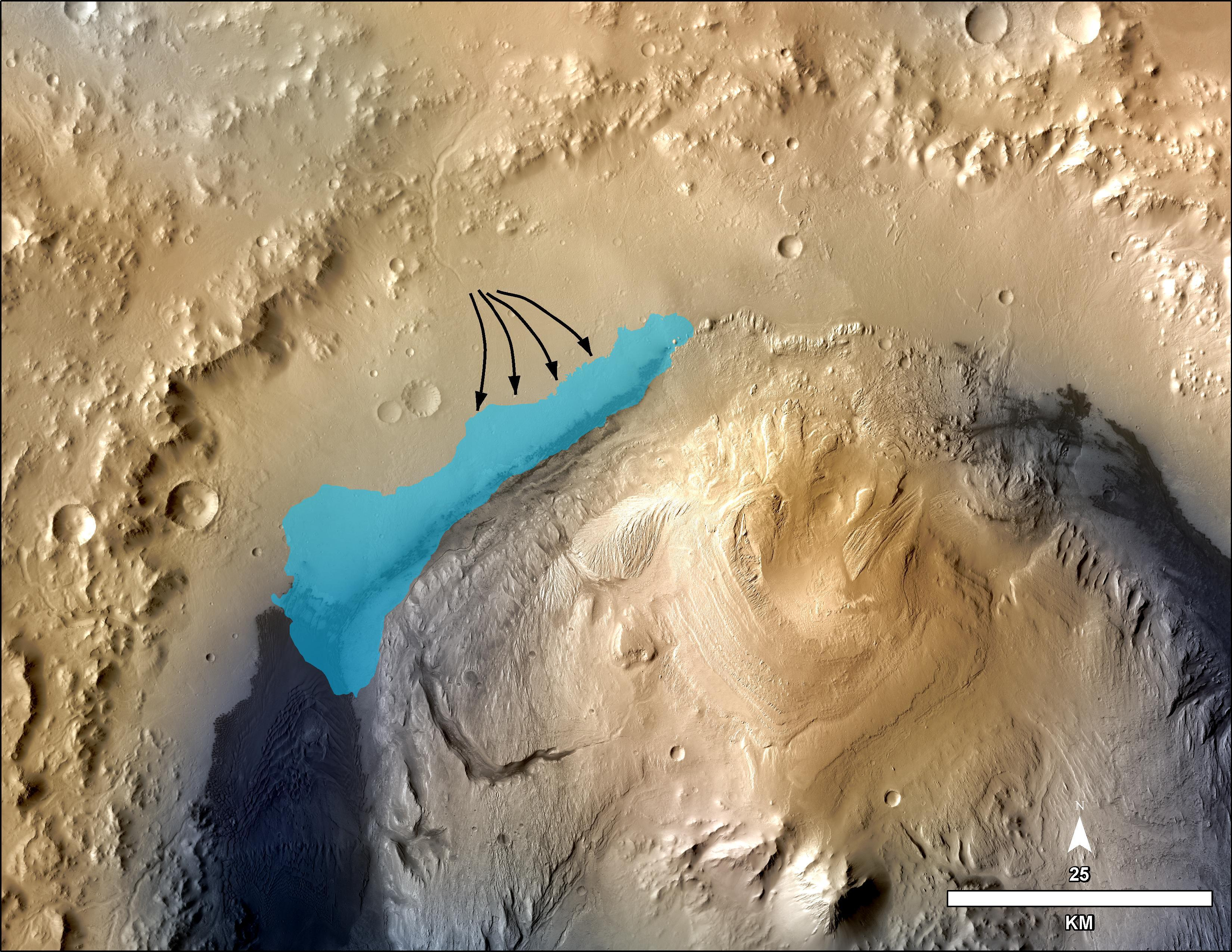
Ancient Lake on Aeolis Palus in Gale Crater - possible size (December 9, 2013).

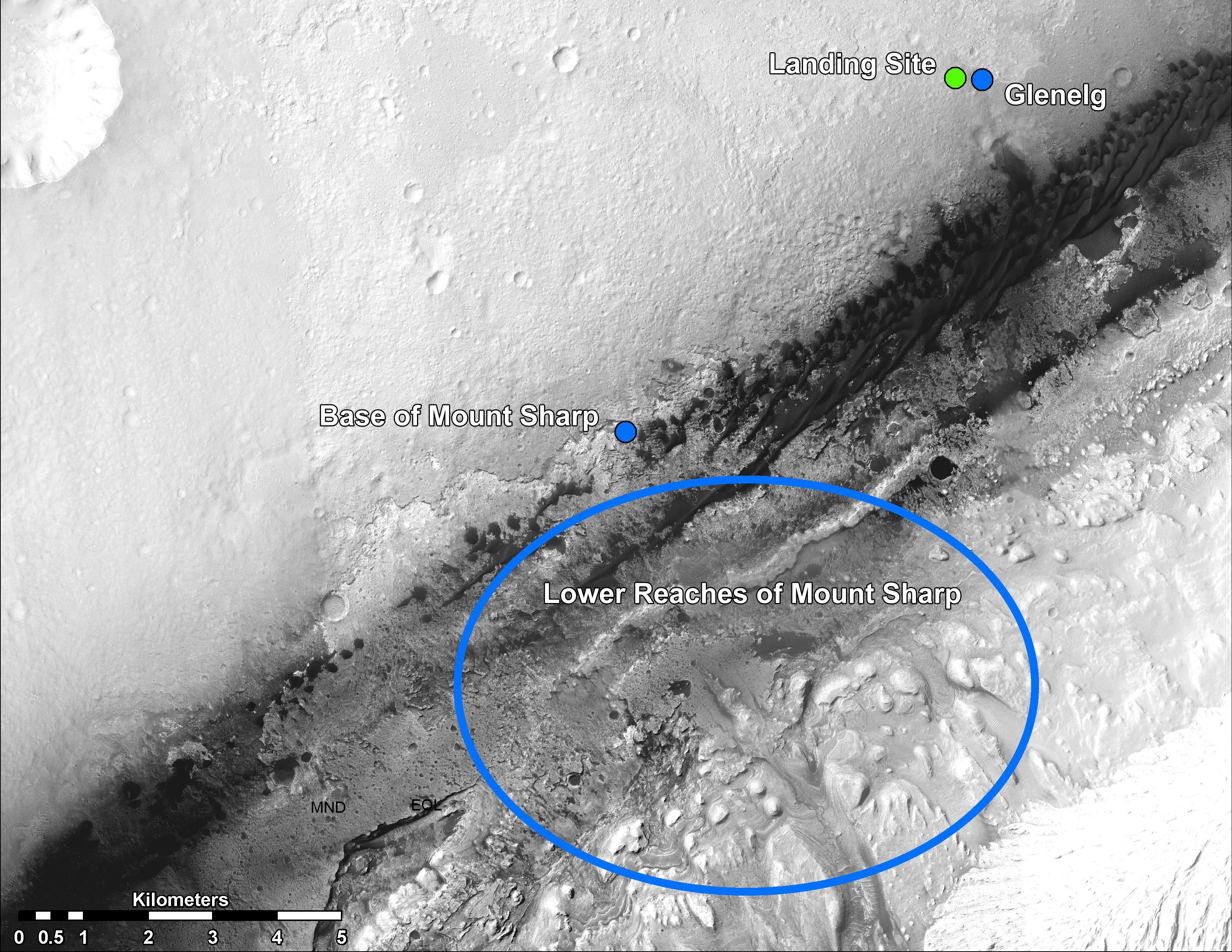
Curiosity rover landing site (green dot) - Blue dot marks Glenelg Intrigue - Blue spot marks "Base of Mount Sharp" - a planned area of study.

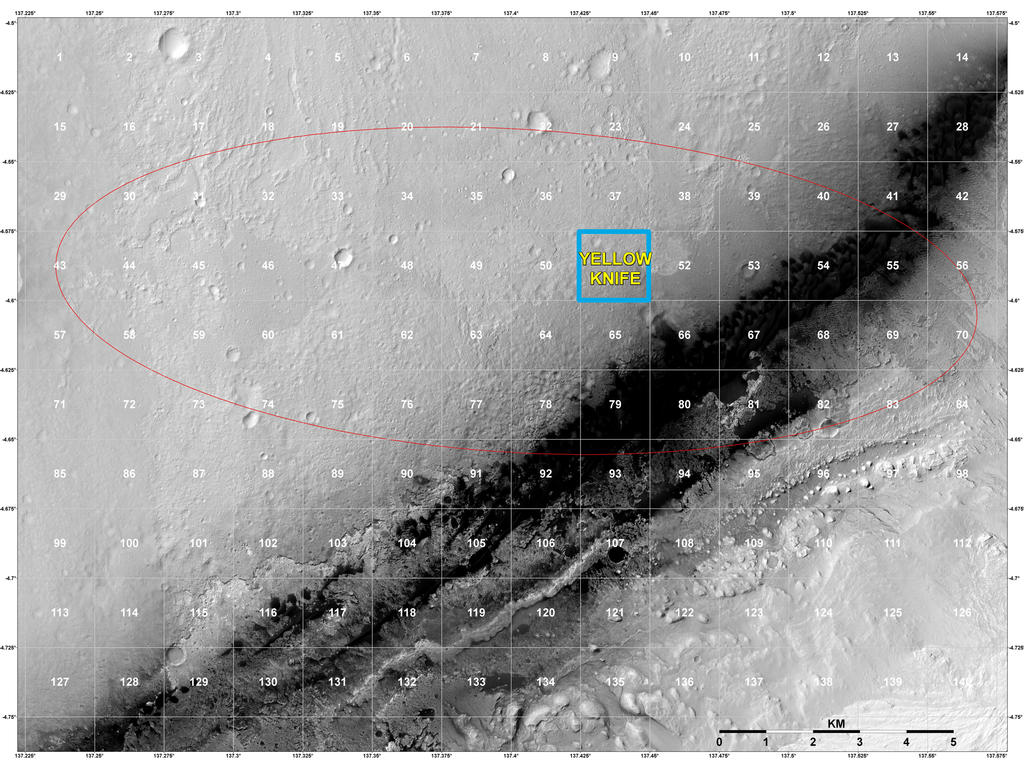
Curiosity rover landing site - "Quad Map" includes "Yellowknife" Quad 51 of Aeolis Palus in Gale Crater.

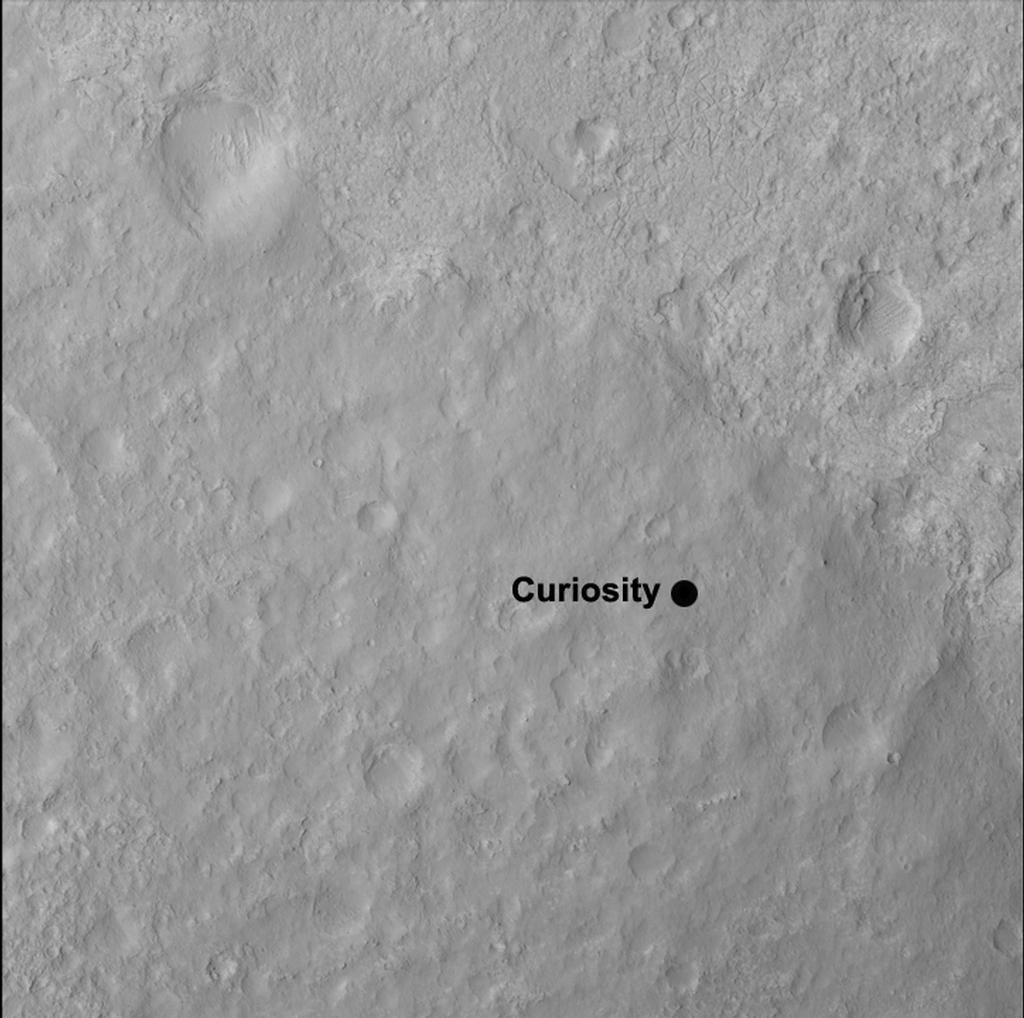
Curiosity rover landing site - "Yellowknife" Quad 51 (1-mi-by-1-mi) of Aeolis Palus in Gale Crater.

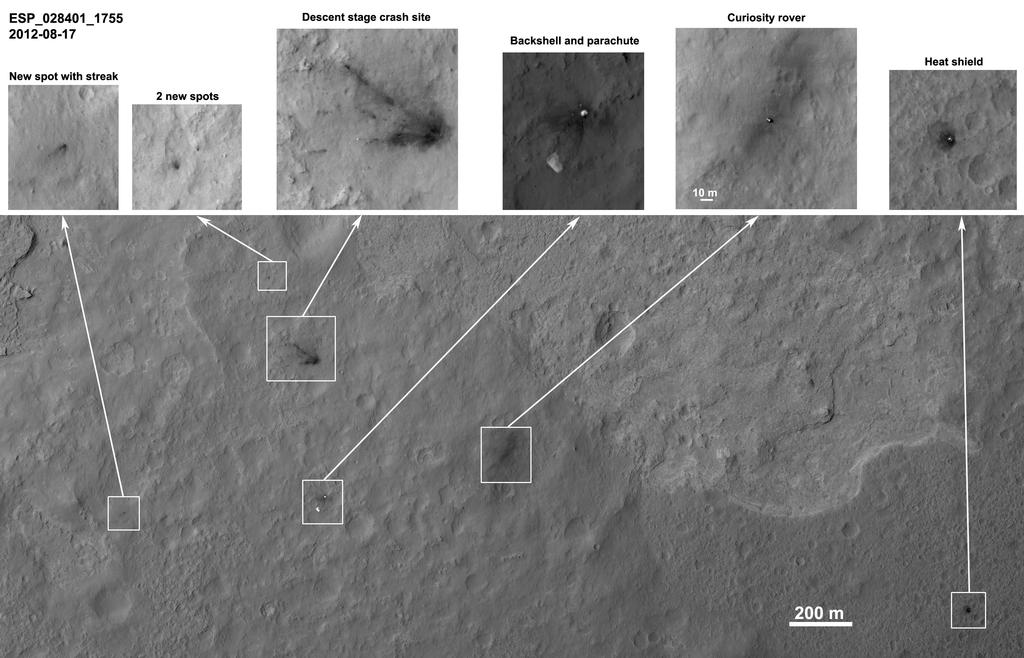
MSL debris field viewed by HiRISE on August 17, 2012 - parachute is 615 m (2,018 ft) from the rover. (3-D: rover and parachute)

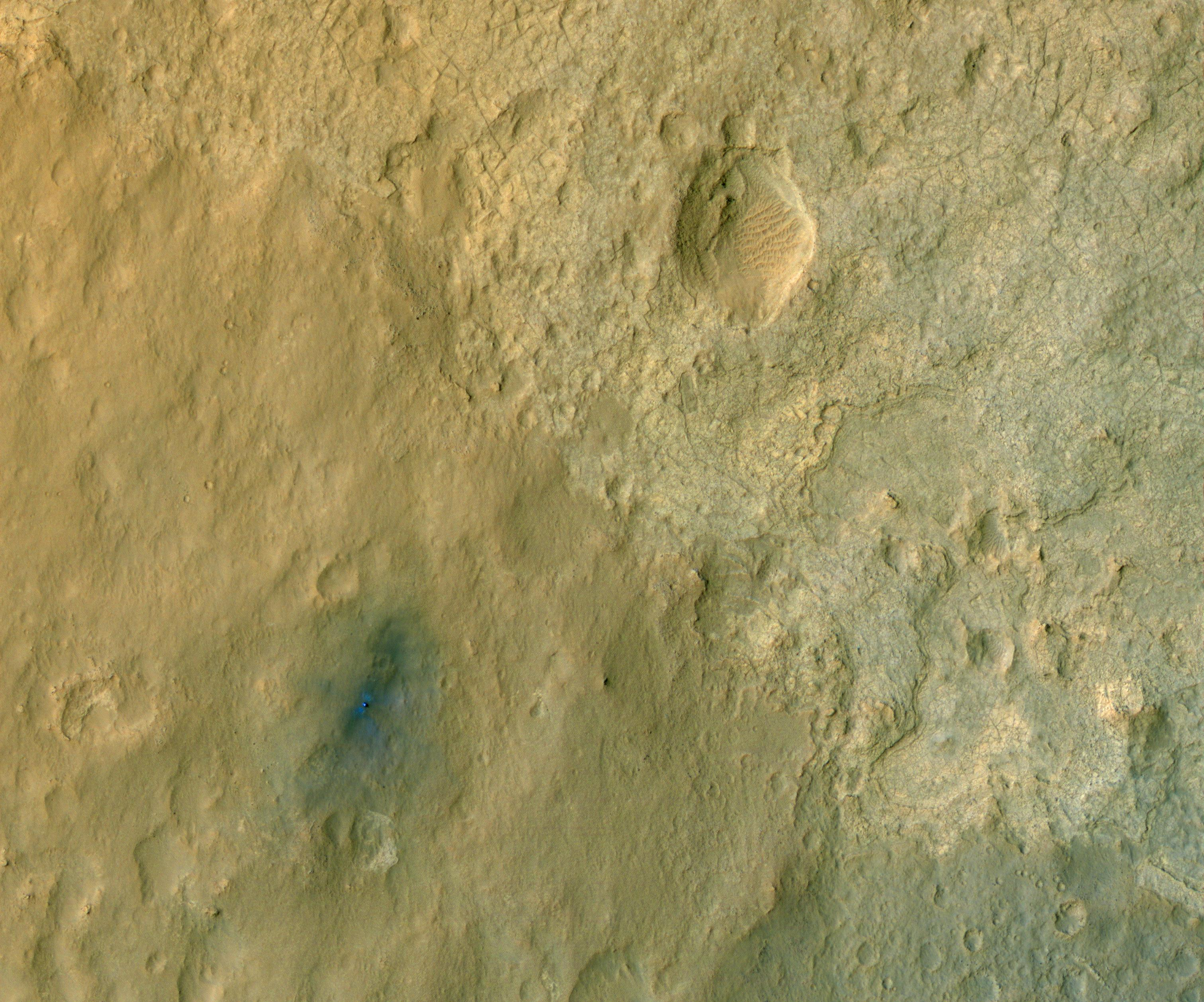
Curiosity's landing site (Bradbury Landing) viewed by HiRISE (MRO) (August 14, 2012).

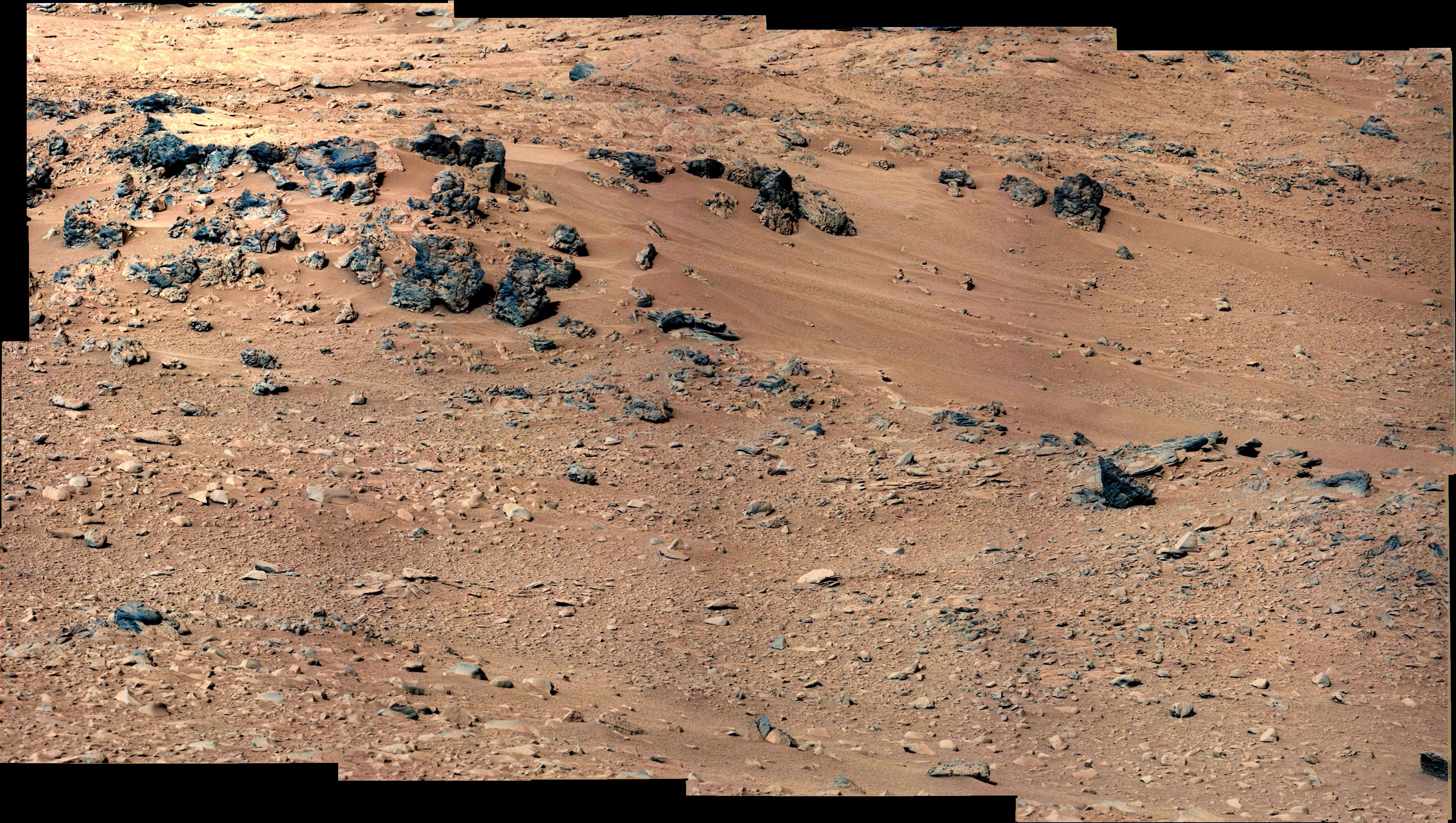
"Rocknest" sand patch in Aeolis Palus - between "Bradbury Landing" and Glenelg (September 28, 2012).

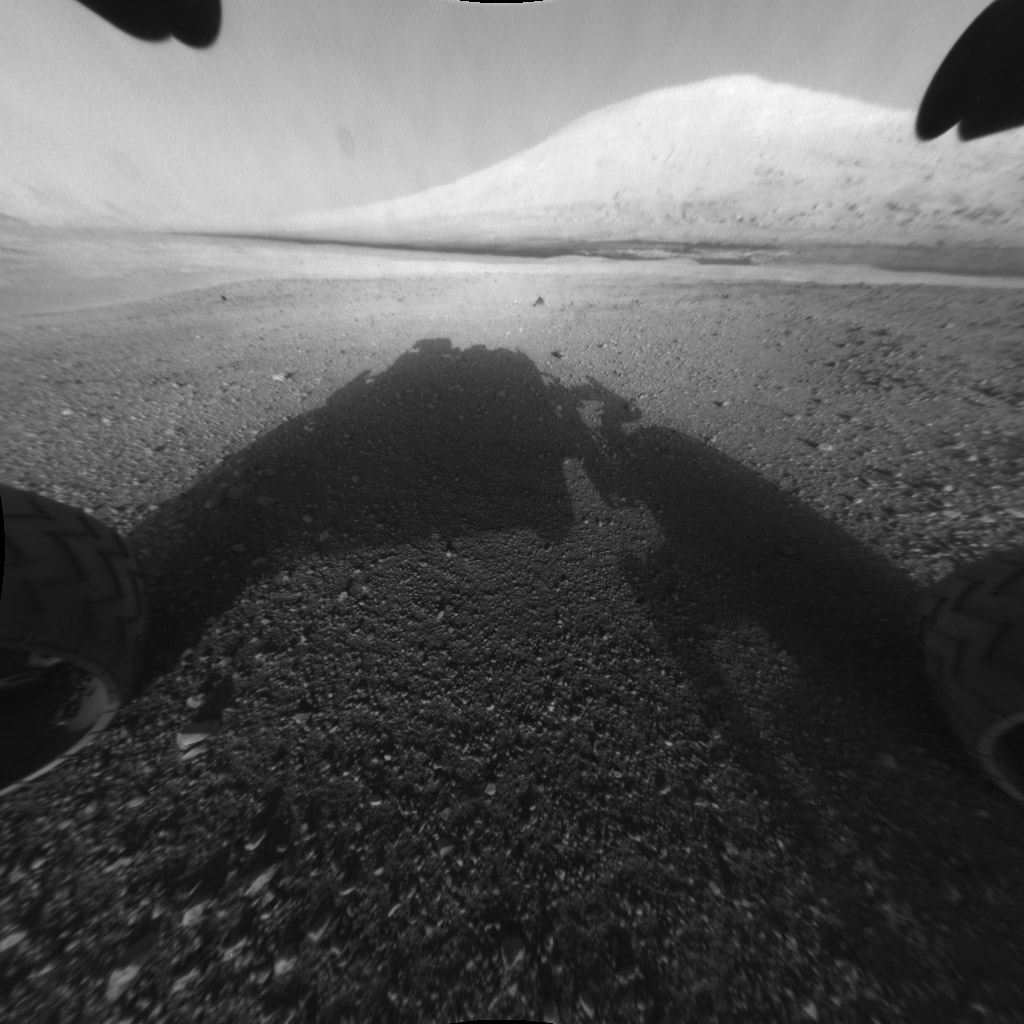
Aeolis Palus with Aeolis Mons ("Mount Sharp") as viewed by the Curiosity rover (August 6, 2012).

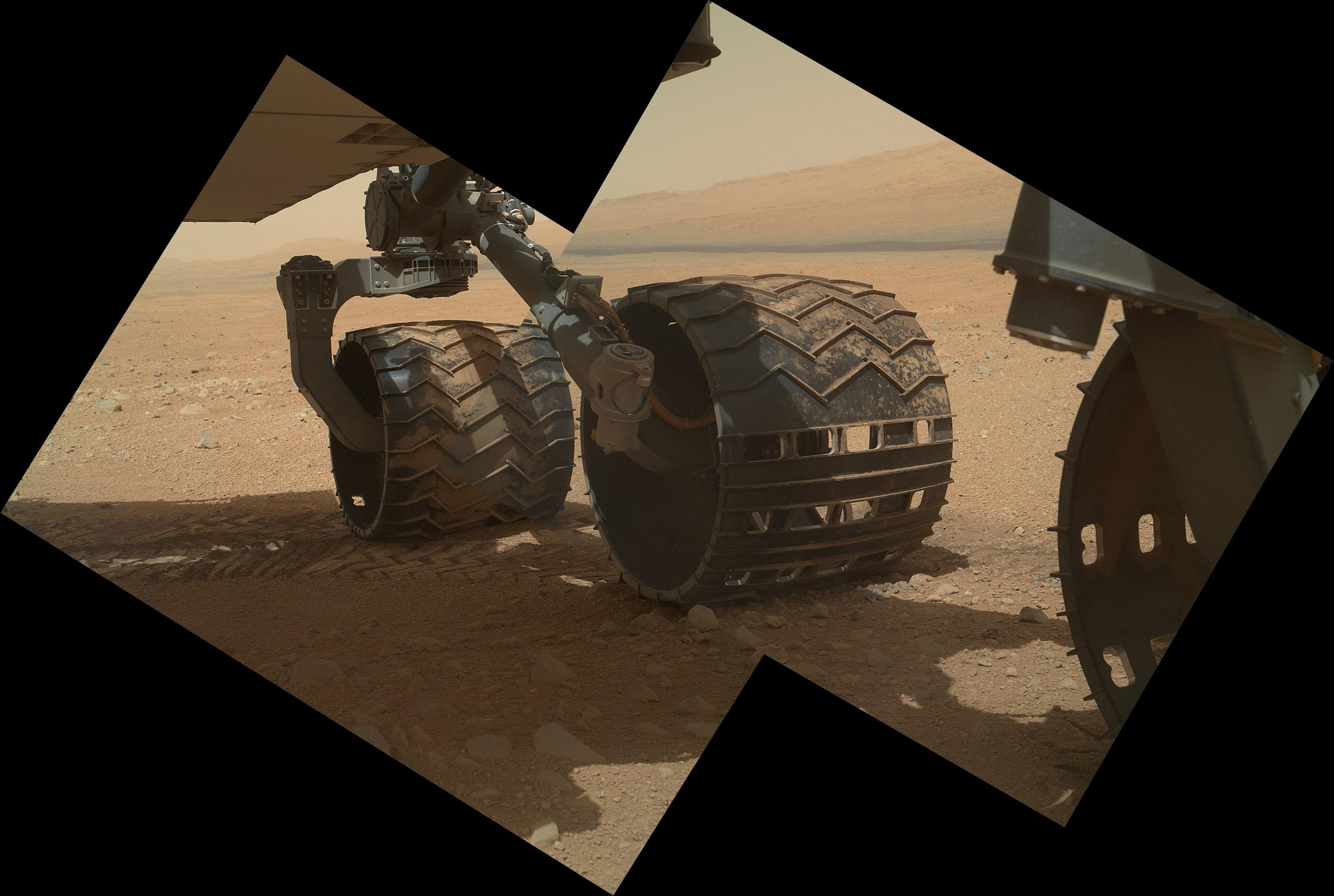
Wheels on the Curiosity rover - "Mount Sharp" is in the background (MAHLI, September 9, 2012).

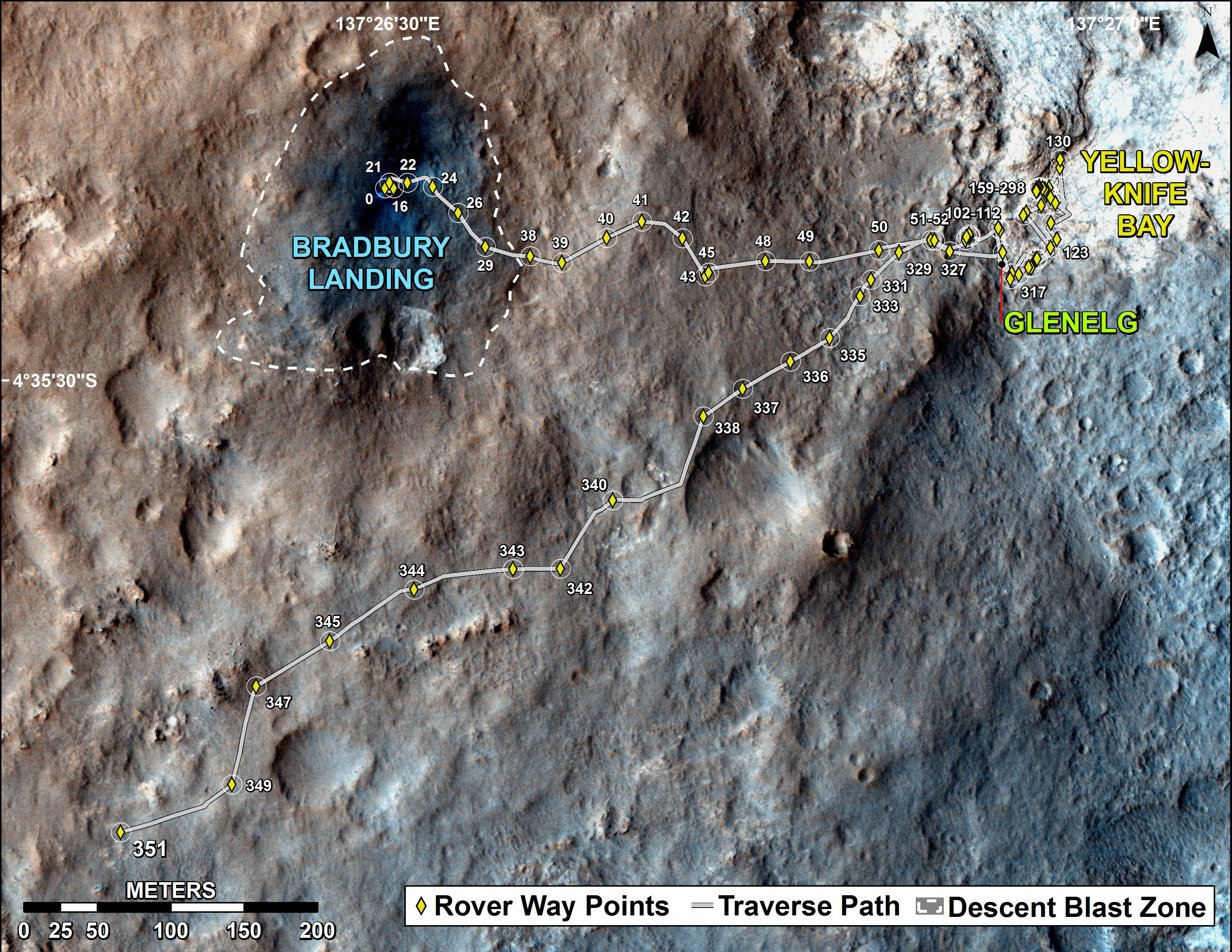
First-Year & First-Mile Traverse Map of the Curiosity rover on Mars (August 1, 2013) (3-D).
Evidence of water on Mars in Aeolis Palus

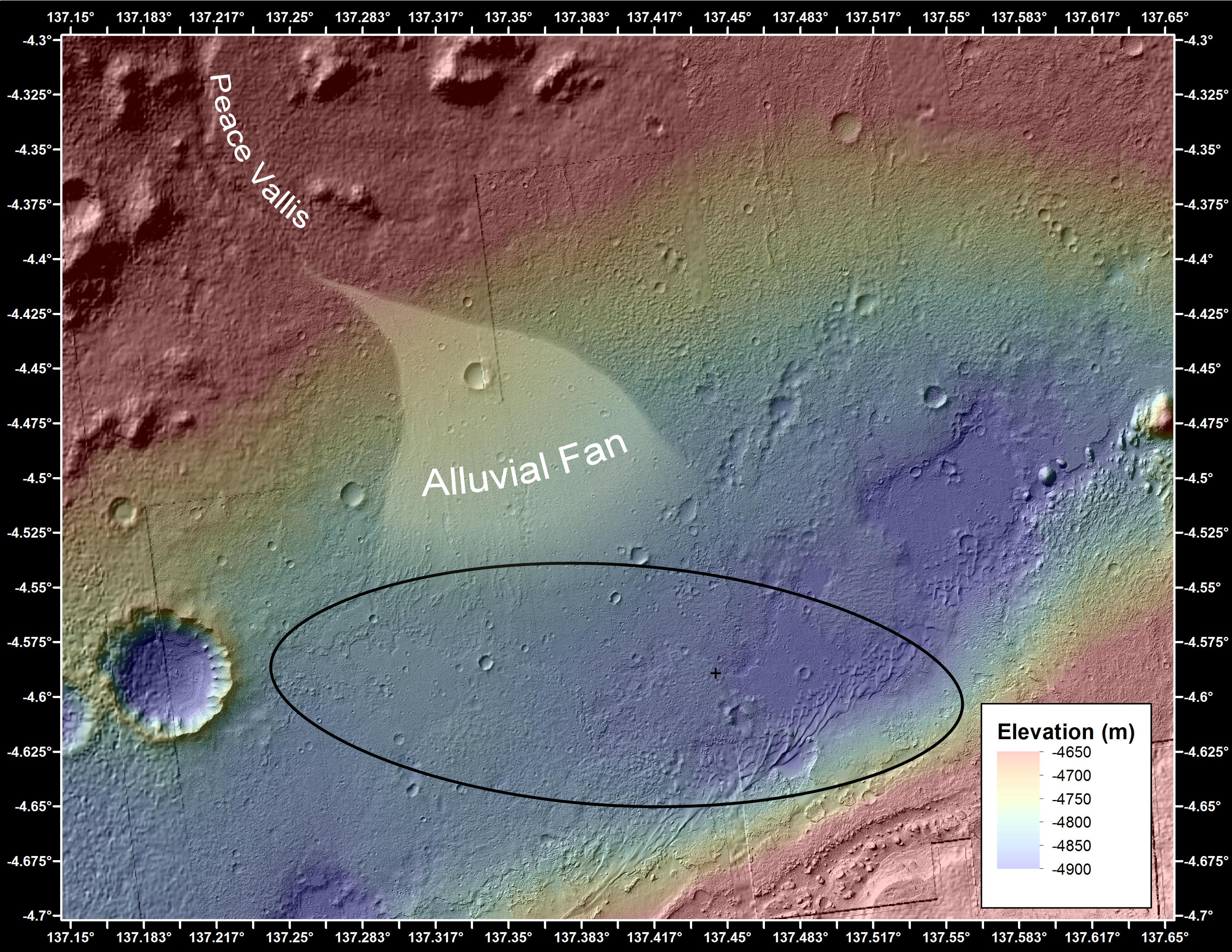
Peace Vallis and related alluvial fan near the Curiosity rover landing ellipse and landing site (noted by +).

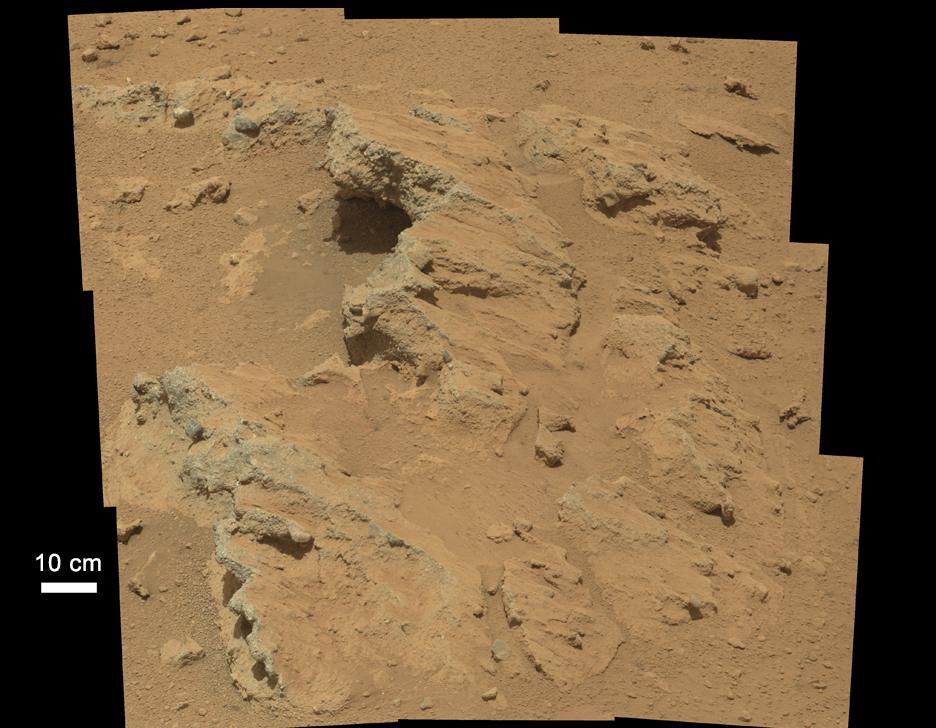
"Hottah" rock outcrop on Mars - an ancient streambed viewed by the Curiosity rover (September 14, 2012). (3-D version.)

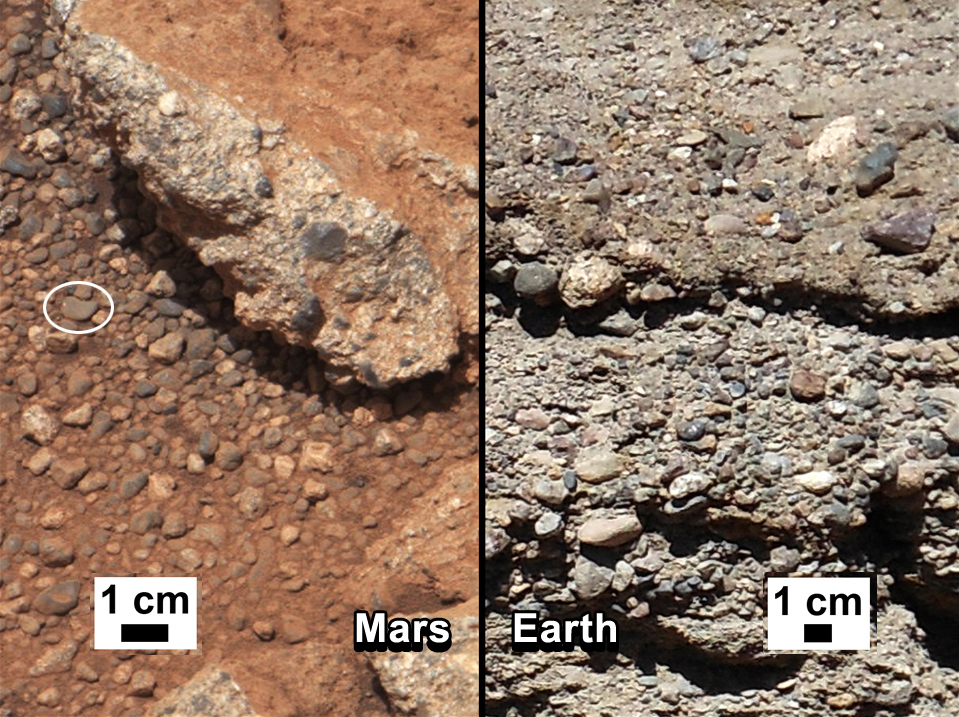
"Link" rock outcrop on Mars - compared with a terrestrial fluvial conglomerate - suggesting water "vigorously" flowing in a stream.

Curiosity rover on the way to Glenelg (September 26, 2012).
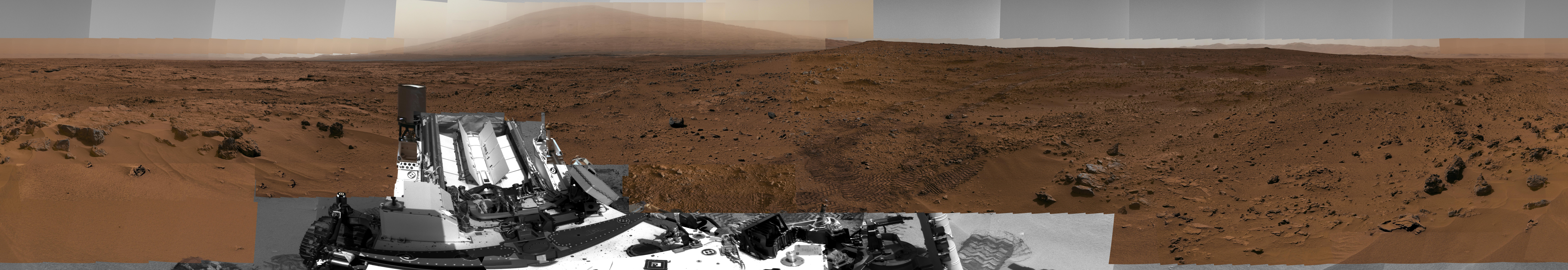
Curiosity's view of the Rocknest area - South is center/North at both ends; Mount Sharp at SE horizon (somewhat left-of-center); Glenelg at East (left-of-center); rover tracks at West (right-of-center) (November 16, 2012; white balanced) (raw color) (interactives).
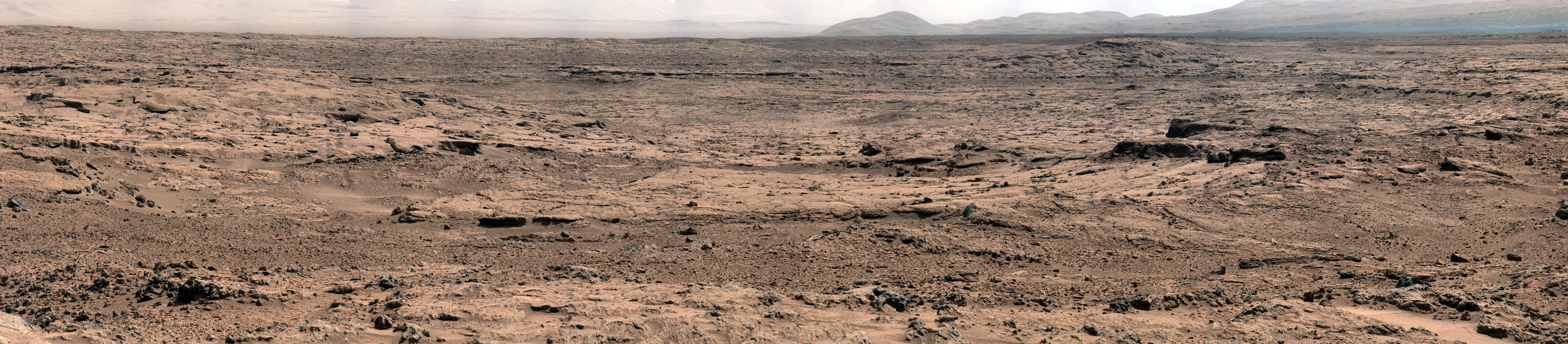
Curiosity's view of Aeolis Palus from Rocknest looking eastward toward Point Lake (center) on the way to Glenelg Intrigue (November 26, 2012; white balanced) (raw color).
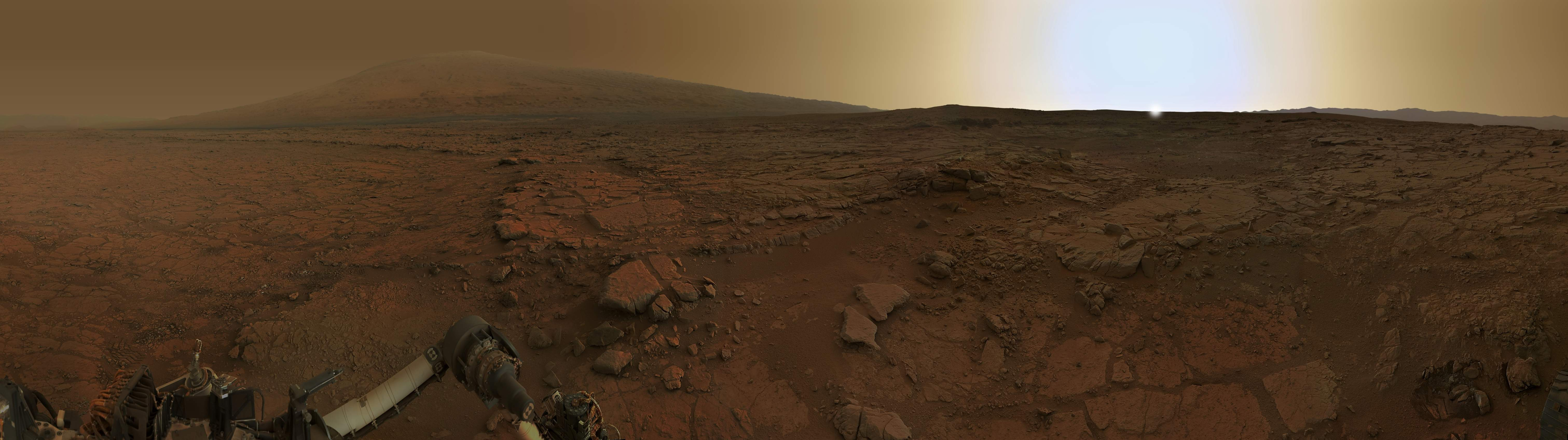
Curiosity's view of Mars sky at sunset (February 2013; Sun simulated by artist).

== See also ==
- Aeolis quadrangle/Gale Crater
- List of plains on Mars
