= Laser-induced breakdown spectroscopy =

Type of atomic emission spectroscopy

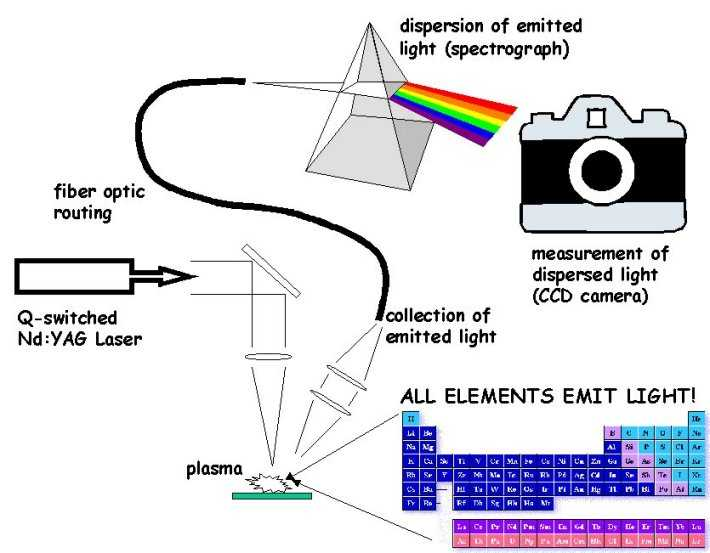
Schematic of a LIBS system – Courtesy of US Army Research Laboratory

Laser-induced breakdown spectroscopy (LIBS) is a type of atomic emission spectroscopy which uses a highly energetic laser pulse as the excitation source. The laser is focused to form a plasma, which atomizes and excites samples. The formation of the plasma only begins when the focused laser achieves a certain threshold for optical breakdown, which generally depends on the environment and the target material.

== 2000s developments ==
From 2000 to 2010, the U.S. Army Research Laboratory (ARL) researched potential extensions to LIBS technology, which focused on hazardous material detection. Applications investigated at ARL included the standoff detection of explosive residues and other hazardous materials, plastic landmine discrimination, and material characterization of various metal alloys and polymers. Results presented by ARL suggest that LIBS may be able to discriminate between energetic and non-energetic materials.

=== Research ===
Broadband high-resolution spectrometers were developed in 2000 and commercialized in 2003. Designed for material analysis, the spectrometer allowed the LIBS system to be sensitive to chemical elements in low concentration.

ARL LIBS applications studied from 2000 to 2010 included:

- Tested for detection of Halon alternative agents
- Tested a field-portable LIBS system for the detection of lead in soil and paint
- Studied the spectral emission of aluminum and aluminum oxides from bulk aluminum in different bath gases
- Performed kinetic modeling of LIBS plumes
- Demonstrated the detection and discrimination of geological materials, plastic landmines, explosives, and chemical and biological warfare agent surrogates

ARL LIBS prototypes studied during this period included:

- Laboratory LIBS setup
- Commercial LIBS system
- Man-portable LIBS device
- Standoff LIBS system developed for 100+ m detection and discriminate on of explosive residues.

== 2010s developments ==
LIBS is one of several analytical techniques that can be deployed in the field as opposed to pure laboratory techniques e.g. spark OES. As of 2015, recent research on LIBS focuses on compact and (man-)portable systems. Some industrial applications of LIBS include the detection of material mix-ups, analysis of inclusions in steel, analysis of slags in secondary metallurgy, analysis of combustion processes, and high-speed identification of scrap pieces for material-specific recycling tasks. Armed with data analysis techniques, this technique is being extended to pharmaceutical samples.

=== LIBS using short laser pulses ===
Following multiphoton or tunnel ionization the electron is being accelerated by inverse Bremsstrahlung and can collide with the nearby molecules and generate new electrons through collisions. If the pulse duration is long, the newly ionized electrons can be accelerated and eventually avalanche or cascade ionization follows. Once the density of the electrons reaches a critical value, breakdown occurs and high density plasma is created which has no memory of the laser pulse. So, the criterion for the shortness of a pulse in dense media is as follows: A pulse interacting with a dense matter is considered to be short if during the interaction the threshold for the avalanche ionization is not reached. At the first glance this definition may appear to be too limiting. Fortunately, due to the delicately balanced behavior of the pulses in dense media, the threshold cannot be reached easily. The phenomenon responsible for the balance is the intensity clamping through the onset of filamentation process during the propagation of strong laser pulses in dense media.

A potentially important development to LIBS involves the use of a short laser pulse as a spectroscopic source. In this method, a plasma column is created as a result of focusing ultrafast laser pulses in a gas. The self-luminous plasma is far superior in terms of low level of continuum and also smaller line broadening. This is attributed to the lower density of the plasma in the case of short laser pulses due to the defocusing effects which limits the intensity of the pulse in the interaction region and thus prevents further multiphoton/tunnel ionization of the gas.

== Line intensity ==
For an optically thin plasma composed of a single, neutral atomic species in local thermal equilibrium (LTE), the density of photons emitted by a transition from level i to level j is

$I_{ij}(\lambda)=\frac{1}{4\pi} n_0 A_{ij}\frac{ g_i \exp^{-E_i/k_B T}}{U(T)} I(\lambda)$

where :

- $I_{ij}$ is the emission rate density of photons (in m^{−3} sr^{−1} s^{−1})
- $n_0$ is the number of neutral atoms in the plasma (in m^{−3})
- $A_{ij}$ is the transition probability between level i and level j (in s^{−1})
- $g_i$ is the degeneracy of the upper level i (2J+1)
- $U(T)$ is the partition function (unitless)
- $E_i$ is the energy level of the upper level i (in eV)
- $k_B$ is the Boltzmann constant (in eV/K)
- $T$ is the temperature (in K)
- $I(\lambda)$ is the line profile such that $\int_{-\infty}^{\infty}I(\lambda)d\lambda = 1$
- $\lambda$ is the wavelength (in nm)

The partition function $U(T)$ is the statistical occupation fraction of every level $k$ of the atomic species :

$U(T) = \sum_j g_j \exp^{-E_j/k_B T}$

== LIBS for food analysis ==
Recently, LIBS has been investigated as a fast, micro-destructive food analysis tool. It is considered a potential analytical tool for qualitative and quantitative chemical analysis, making it suitable as a PAT (Process Analytical Technology) or portable tool. Milk, bakery products, tea, vegetable oils, water, cereals, flour, potatoes, palm date and different types of meat have been analyzed using LIBS. Few studies have shown its potential as an adulteration detection tool for certain foods. LIBS has also been evaluated as a promising elemental imaging technique in meat.

In 2019, researchers of the University of York and of the Liverpool John Moores University employed LIBS for studying 12 European oysters (Ostrea edulis, Linnaeus, 1758) from the Late Mesolithic shell midden at Conors Island (Republic of Ireland). The results highlighted the applicability of LIBS to determine prehistoric seasonality practices as well as biological age and growth at an improved rate and reduced cost than was previously achievable.

== See also ==
- Atomic spectroscopy
- Laser ablation
- Laser-induced fluorescence
- List of surface analysis methods
- Photoacoustic spectroscopy
- Raman spectroscopy
- Spectroscopy
