= Joanna V. Clark =

American geoscientist

- Born: Joanna V. Hogancamp
- Scientific career
- Institutions: NASA
- Thesis: Martian surface mineralogy and geochemistry as indicators of past environmental, geochemical, and aqueous conditions (2022)
- Doctoral advisor: Tom Lapen

Joanna V. Clark is a geoscientist working for the NASA Johnson Space Center, where she is a collaborator on the Sample Analysis at Mars (SAM) and Mars Science Lab (MSL) science teams. Her research includes conducting laboratory experiments to understand better ground and mineral samples acquired by the curiosity rover on Mars.

== Education ==
Clark has an undergraduate degree in geological sciences completed at The State University of New York at Geneseo in 2013, a master's degree in geological sciences from The University of Alabama completed in 2015, and a PhD in geological and earth sciences completed at The University of Houston in 2021.

=== PhD thesis ===
In 2019, Clark was awarded a two-year, $285,000 NASA grant to support the work of her thesis in which she studied the effect of temperature on silica formation to understand previous climate conditions on Mars better. To determine whether the planet once contained life, paleoclimatologists study clues left behind in rocks or, in this case, the oxygen composition of silica. Clark's research focused on performing laboratory experiments to form silica at subzero temperatures, which was then used to determine if water had previously been present on the planet. According to her advisor, Tom Lapen, it is rare for a graduate student to receive such major funding as these programs are highly competitive, with top researchers across the U.S. submitting hundreds of proposals.

== Career ==
=== Mars Science Lab (MSL) ===
Joanna Clark became a full-time member of the Mars group at the NASA Johnson Space Center through the JETS II Contract, working under Jacobs Solutions Inc. It is within this group that one of their primary science objectives is to assess the habitability of ancient and modern martian environments by using the Curiosity rover through a series of instruments and technologies that include: SAM, CheMin, APXS, ChemCam, DAN, REMS, RAD, MastCam & MAHLI.

=== Sample Analysis at Mars (SAM) ===
Clark is a payload uplink lead for the Curiosity rover, in which she delivers commands to collect samples for the SAM instrument to analyze. From there, results are sent back to Earth for her team to further assess past habitability and gather data to use for future exploration projects such as one day sending humans to Mars.

One of Clark's projects for NASA included using mineralogical and chemical data from Curiosity to determine whether the Martian soil found from Rocknest could be used with a water-extraction device. This was accomplished by utilizing the SAM instrument and determining which chemical compounds were included in the Martian soil. From there, the Johnson Space Center replicated a simulant called JSC-Rocknest to run a variety of experiments on, which included heating it to different temperatures to determine its water re-absorption rate and determining its ability to be broken down into compounds needed for liveable conditions. Their findings include a variety of hopeful results necessary to further develop any new advancements for exploring Mars. Since the study, large quantities of JSC-Rocknest have been produced to continue with large-scale applications such as In-Situ Resource Utilization (ISRU) systems and component testing, ISRU plant growth studies, and ISRU habitat studies.

==== Other NASA Involvement ====
- Clark is a laboratory lead at NASA's Mars, Moon, Meteorite Evolved Gas Analysis (M3EGA) laboratory. Their objective is to conduct thermal and evolved gas analyses of volatile-bearing minerals. These analyses are similar to the data collection that happen during planetary missions that determine whether certain minerals may be present and, if so, in which quantities.
- Clark is also a laboratory lead at the Astromaterials Research & Exploration Science (ARES) General Chemical Laboratory. The facility offers a range of equipment to serve the needs of ARES scientists in Research and Curation.
- Clark is on the leadership council of "Supporting Women at NASA," a networking group consisting of female scientists and engineers looking to share their passions for planetary sciences among themselves and the community.
