= Sample Analysis at Mars =

Science instrument on the Curiosity rover

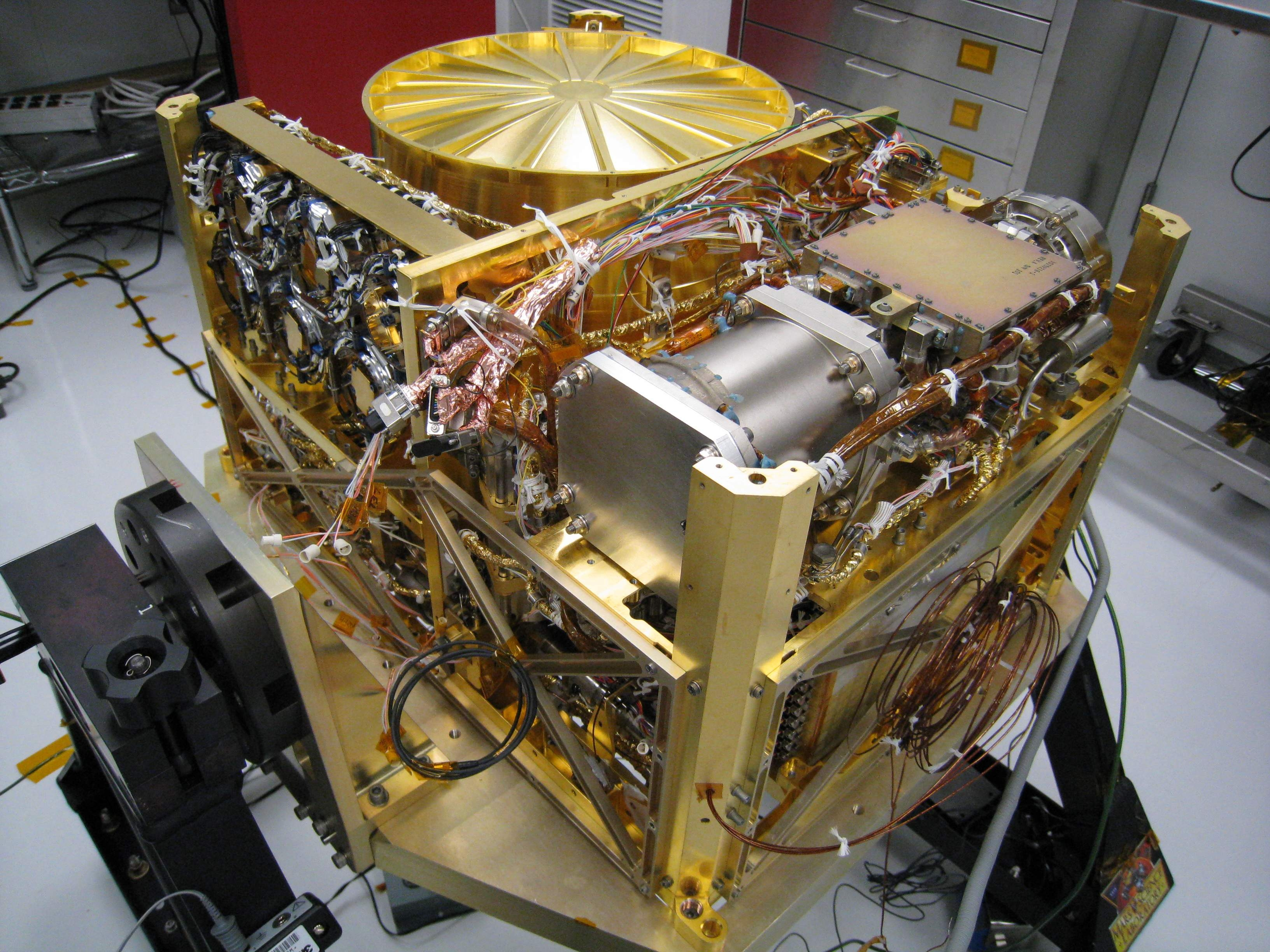
Sample Analysis at Mars for MSL.

Sample Analysis at Mars (SAM) is a suite of instruments on the Mars Science Laboratory Curiosity rover. The SAM instrument suite analyzed organics and gases from both atmospheric and solid samples. It was developed by the NASA Goddard Space Flight Center, the Laboratoire des Atmosphères Milieux Observations Spatiales (LATMOS) associated to the Laboratoire Inter-Universitaire des Systèmes Atmosphériques (LISA) (jointly operated by France's Centre national de la recherche scientifique and Parisian universities), and Honeybee Robotics, along with many additional external partners.

== Instruments ==
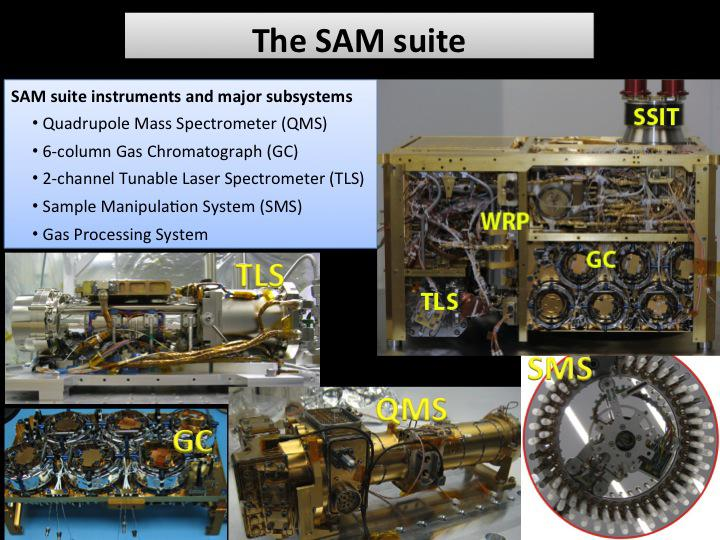
The SAM suite

The SAM suite consists of three instruments:

1. The quadrupole mass spectrometer (QMS) detects gases sampled from the atmosphere or those released from solid samples by heating.
2. The gas chromatograph (GC) is used to separate out individual gases from a complex mixture into molecular components. The resulting gas flow is analyzed in the mass spectrometer with a mass range of 2–535 daltons.
3. The tunable laser spectrometer (TLS) performs precision measurements of oxygen and carbon isotope ratios in carbon dioxide (CO_{2}) and methane (CH_{4}) in the atmosphere in order to distinguish between their geochemical or biological origin.

== Subsystems ==
The SAM has three subsystems: the 'chemical separation and processing laboratory', for enrichment and derivatization of the organic molecules of the sample; the sample manipulation system (SMS) for transporting powder delivered from the MSL drill to a SAM inlet and into one of 74 sample cups. The SMS then moves the sample to the SAM oven to release gases by heating to up to 1000 °C; and the pump subsystem to purge the separators and analysers. Of the 74 sample cups, 6 are used for calibration, 9 are reserved for 'wet chemistry' experiments, and 59 are dry cups for standard use (for use in Evolved Gas Analysis experiments). The wet and dry cups are single-use to prevent contamination; 29 of the dry cups had been used by February 2017. There are two types of wet chemistry experiments, tetramethylammonium hydroxide (TMAH; 2 cups) and N-methyl-N-(tert-butyldimethylsilyl)trifluoroacetamide (MTBSTFA; 7 cups), of which 1 TMAH and 3 MTBSTFA have been used as of January 2025.

The Space Physics Research Laboratory at the University of Michigan built the main power supply, command and data handling unit, valve and heater controller, filament/bias controller, and high voltage module. The uncooled infrared detectors were developed and provided by the Polish company VIGO Photonics.

== Timeline ==
- 9 November 2012: A pinch of fine sand and dust became the first solid Martian sample deposited into the SAM. The sample came from the patch of windblown material called Rocknest, which had provided a sample previously for mineralogical analysis by CheMin instrument.
- 3 December 2012: NASA reported SAM had detected water molecules, chlorine and sulphur in soil. Hints of organic compounds couldn't be ruled out as contamination from Curiosity itself, however.
- 16 December 2014: NASA reported the Curiosity rover detected a "tenfold spike", likely localized, in the amount of methane in the Martian atmosphere in Gale Crater. Sample measurements taken "a dozen times over 20 months" showed increases in late 2013 and early 2014, averaging "7 parts of methane per billion in the atmosphere." Before and after that, readings averaged around one-tenth that level. In addition, high levels of organic chemicals, particularly chlorobenzene, were detected in powder drilled from one of the rocks, named "Cumberland", analyzed by the Curiosity rover.
- 24 March 2015: NASA reported the first detection of nitrogen released after heating surface sediments on the planet Mars. The nitrogen in nitrate is in a "fixed" state, meaning that it is in an oxidized form that can be used by living organisms. The discovery supports the notion that ancient Mars may have been habitable for life.
- 4 April 2015: NASA reported studies, based on measurements by the Sample Analysis at Mars (SAM) instrument on the Curiosity rover, of the Martian atmosphere using xenon and argon isotopes. Results provided support for a "vigorous" loss of atmosphere early in the history of Mars and were consistent with an atmospheric signature found in bits of atmosphere captured in some Martian meteorites found on Earth.
- 9 September 2020: The first TMAH wet chemistry experiment was performed.
- 15 November 2020: NASA scientists including Joanna V. Clark were able to replicate a Mars simulant based soil using SAM, on Earth called JSC-Rocknest which is being used for a series of tests including heating it to different temperatures to determine its water re-absorption rate and ability to be broken down into compounds needed for liveable conditions.
- 1 November 2021: Astronomers reported detecting, in a "first-of-its-kind" process based on SAM instruments, organic molecules, including benzoic acid, ammonia and other related unknown compounds.
- 21 April 2026: Scientists report the detection of over 20 organic molecules from the 2020 TMAH experiment.

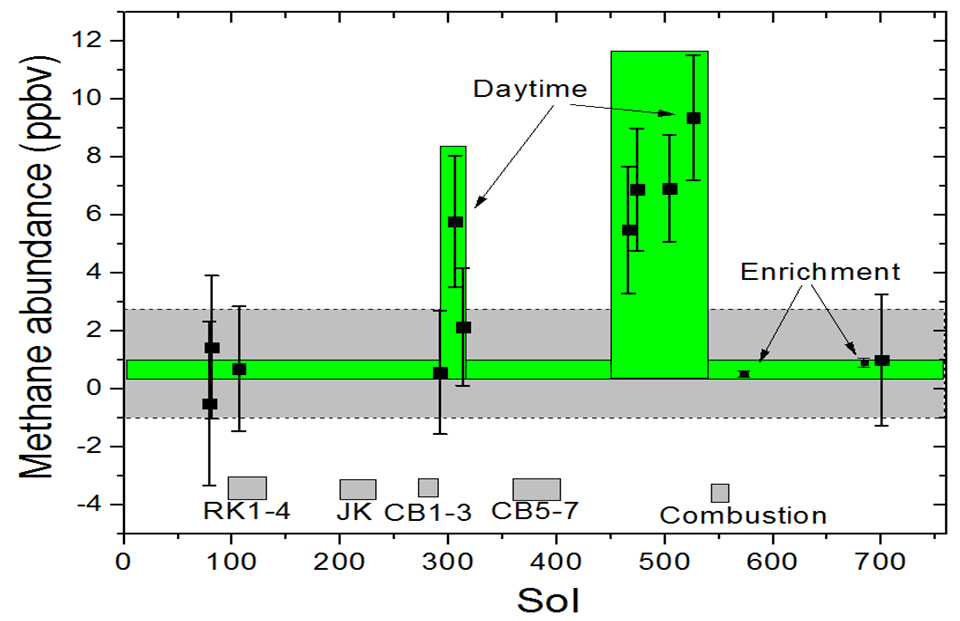
Methane measurements in the atmosphere of Mars
by the Curiosity rover (August 2012 to September 2014).

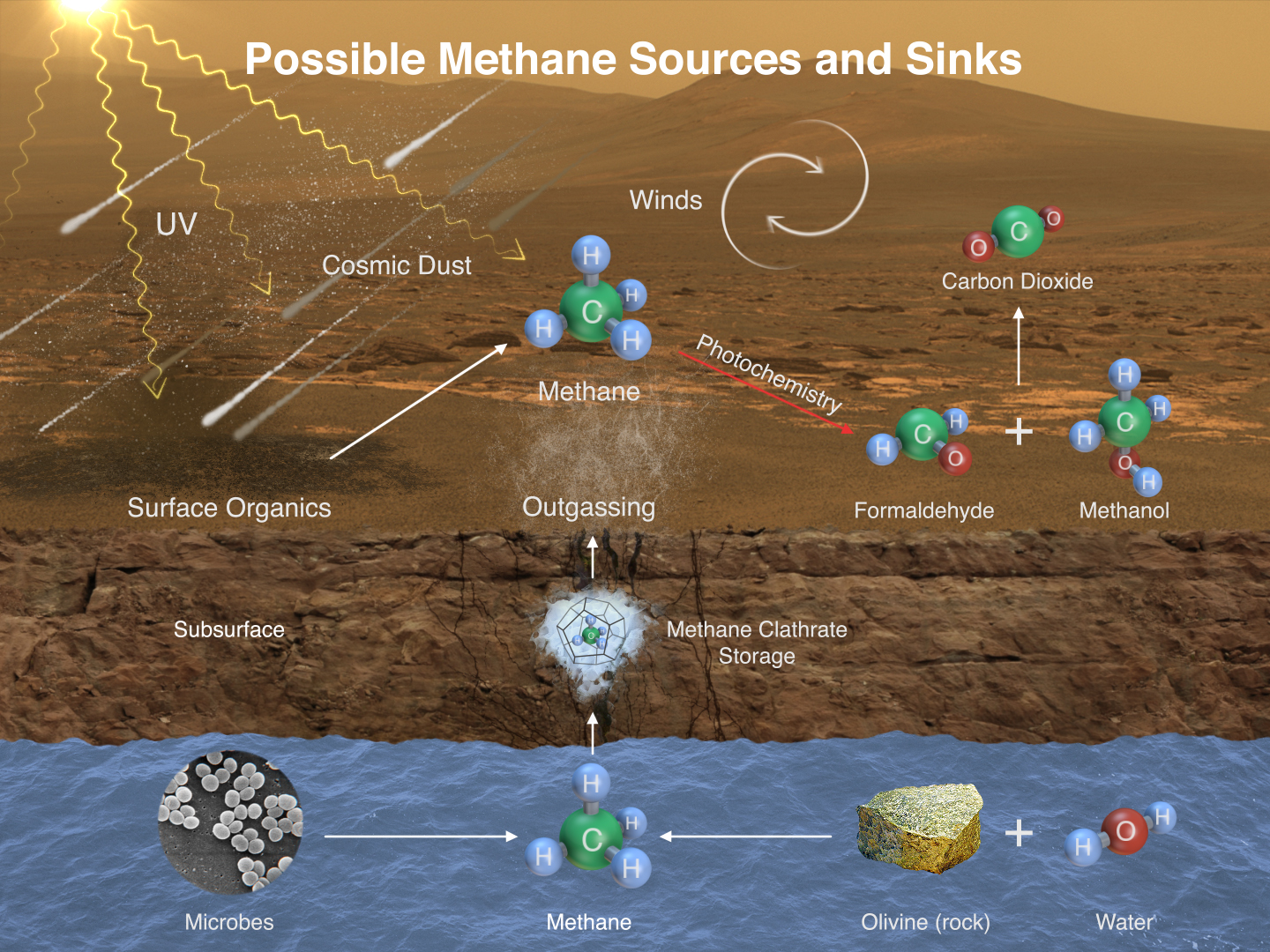
Methane (CH_{4}) on Mars – potential sources and sinks.

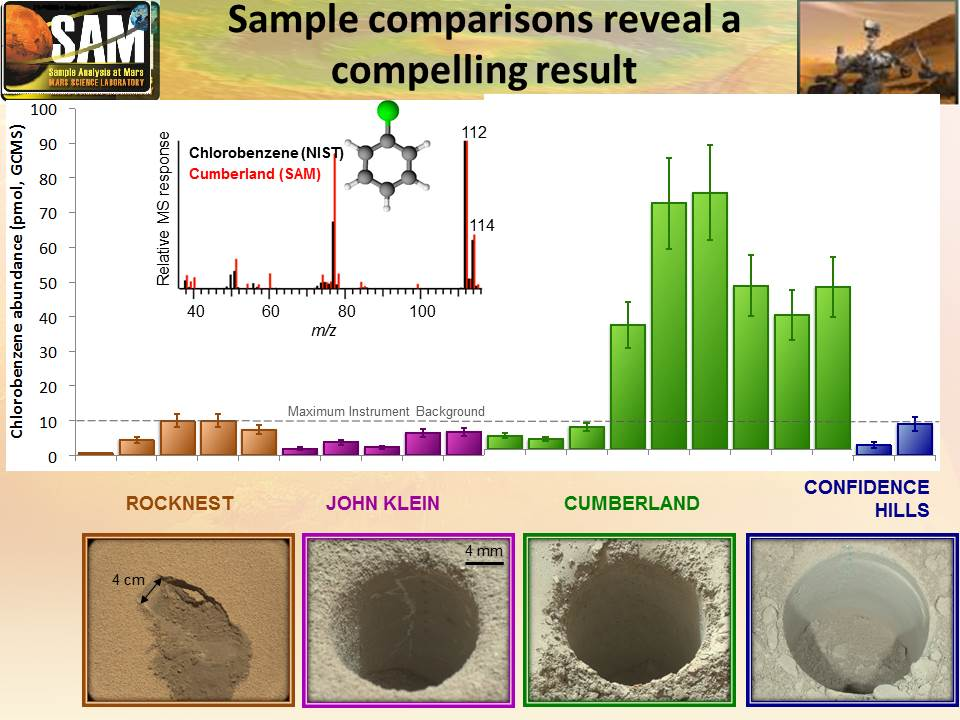
Comparison of organics in Martian rocks – chlorobenzene levels were much higher in the "Cumberland" rock sample.

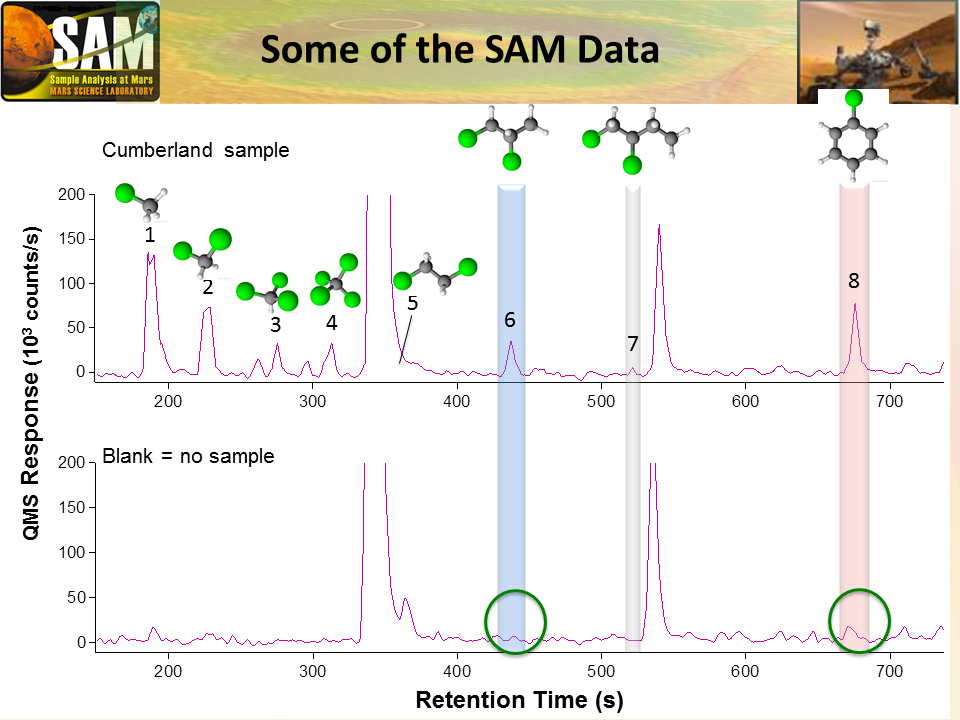
Detection of organics in the "Cumberland" rock sample.

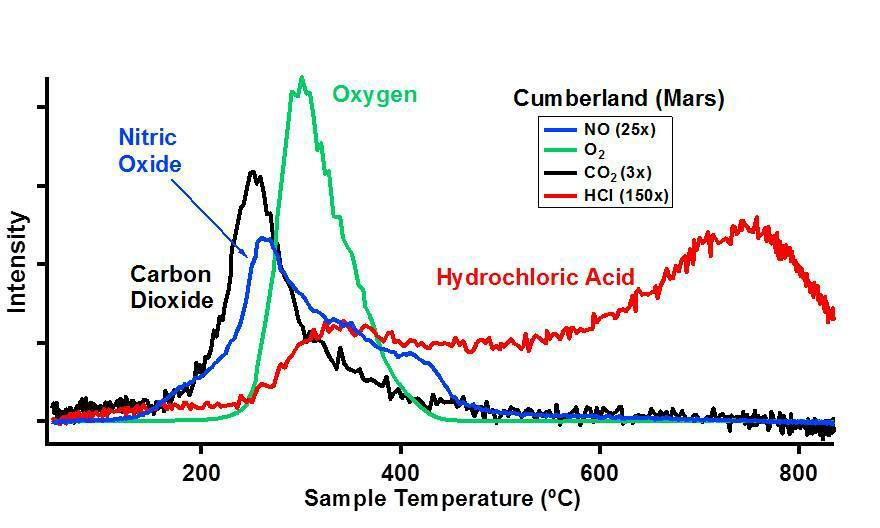
Spectral analysis (SAM) of "Cumberland" rock.

== Gallery ==
=== Videos ===
Interview with Paul Mahaffy, Sample Analysis at Mars (SAM) principal investigator.

Scientists and engineers use the Mars chamber to test specimens on the SAM instrument.

== See also ==
- Thermal and Evolved Gas Analyzer (Phoenix lander)
- Urey instrument
