= Rocknest 3 =

Martian rock

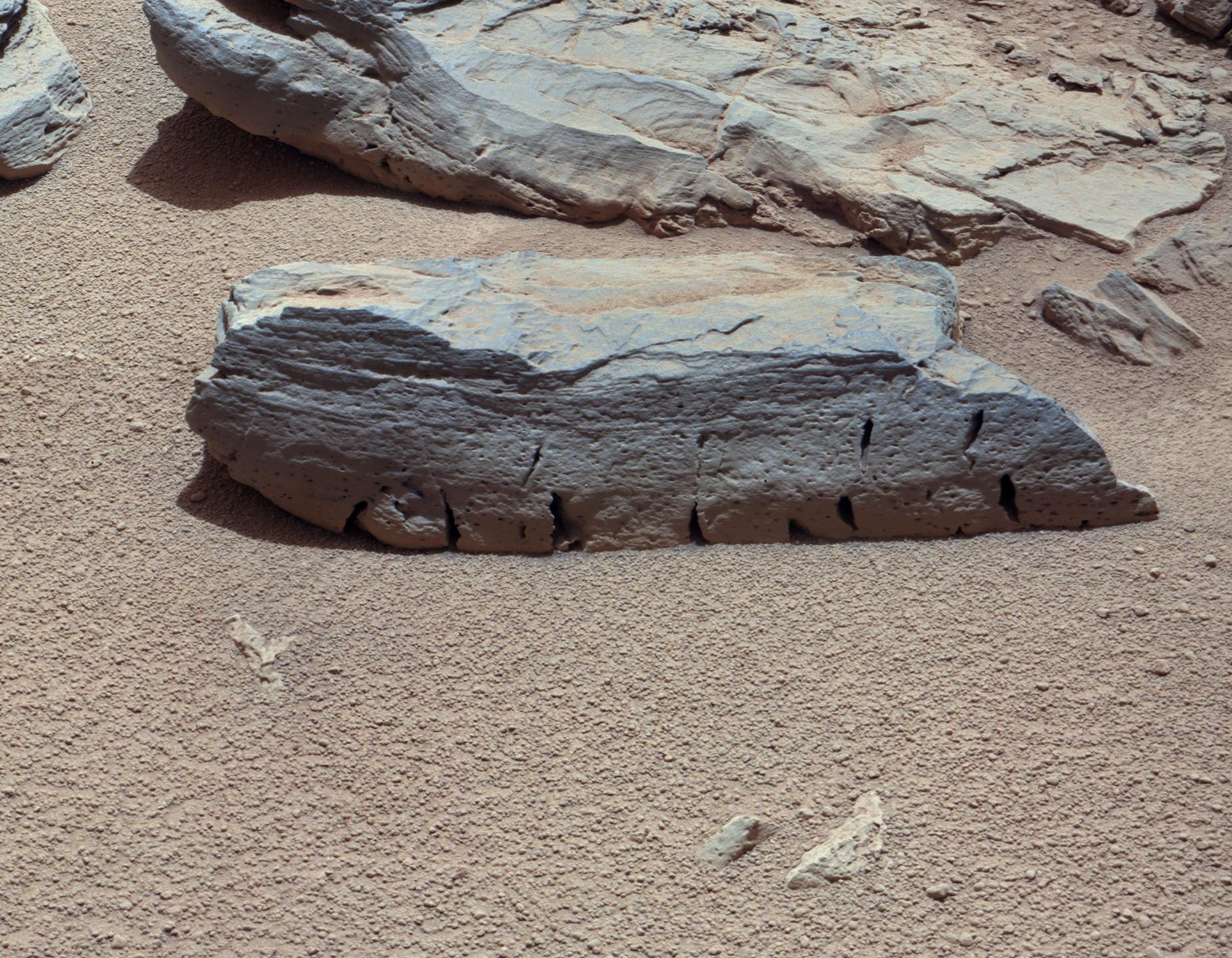
- "Rocknest 3" rock on Mars - target of the ChemCam and APXS instruments on the Curiosity rover (October 5, 2012) (white-balanced image).
- Feature type: Rock
- Coordinates: 4.59°S 137.44°E

Rocknest 3 is a rock on the surface of Aeolis Palus, between Peace Vallis and Aeolis Mons (Mount Sharp), in Gale crater on the planet Mars. The approximate site coordinates are: 4.59°S 137.44°E.

The rock was encountered at Rocknest by the Curiosity rover on its way from Bradbury Landing to the Point Lake overlook while traveling toward Glenelg Intrigue in October 2012. The rock measures about 10 cm (3.9 in) high and 40 cm (16 in) wide and was a target of the ChemCam and APXS instruments on the Curiosity rover.

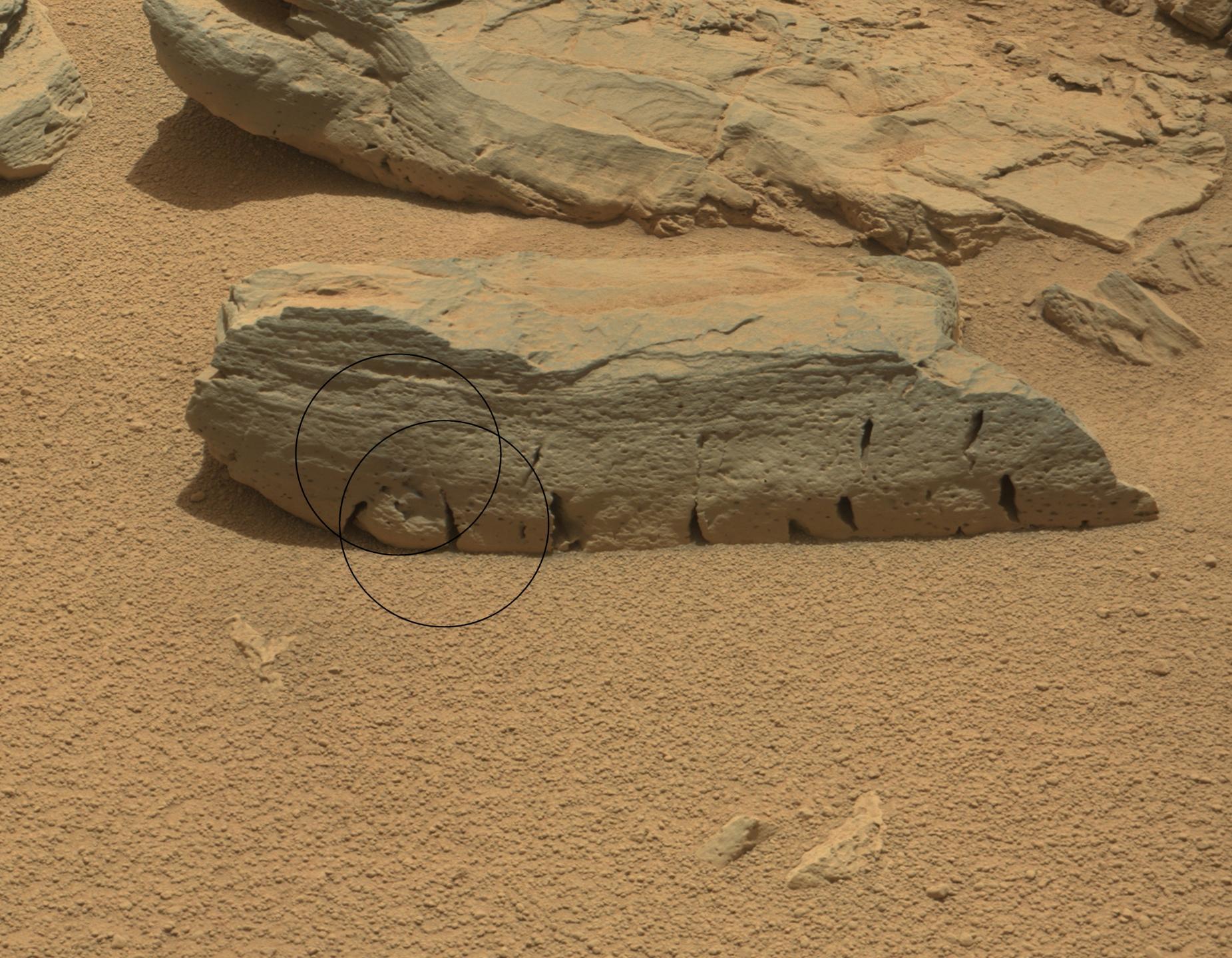
"Rocknest 3" rock - target of the ChemCam and APXS instruments on the Curiosity rover (October 5, 2012 ).

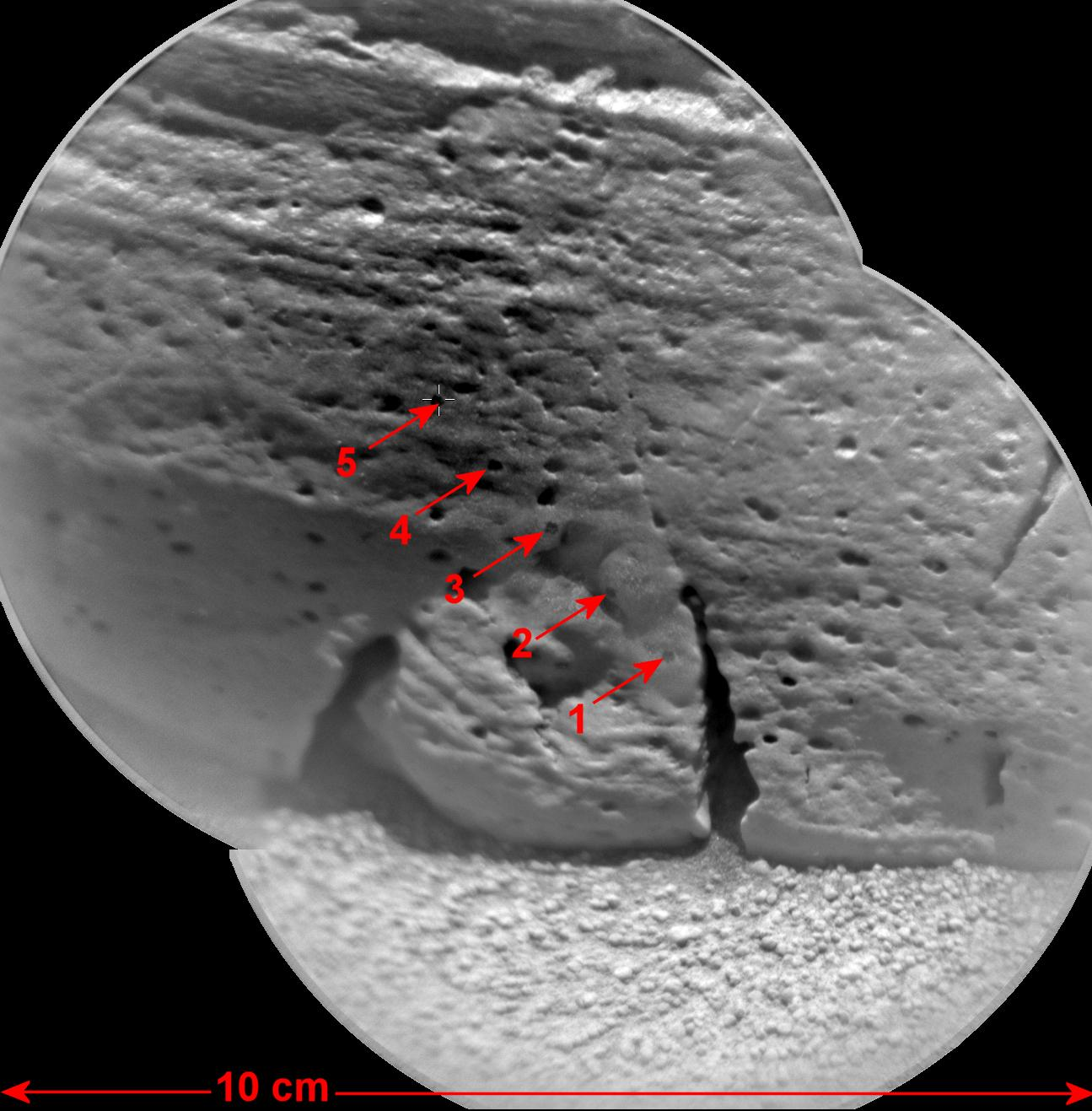
"Rocknest 3" rock - target of the ChemCam and APXS instruments on the Curiosity rover (October 3, 2012)
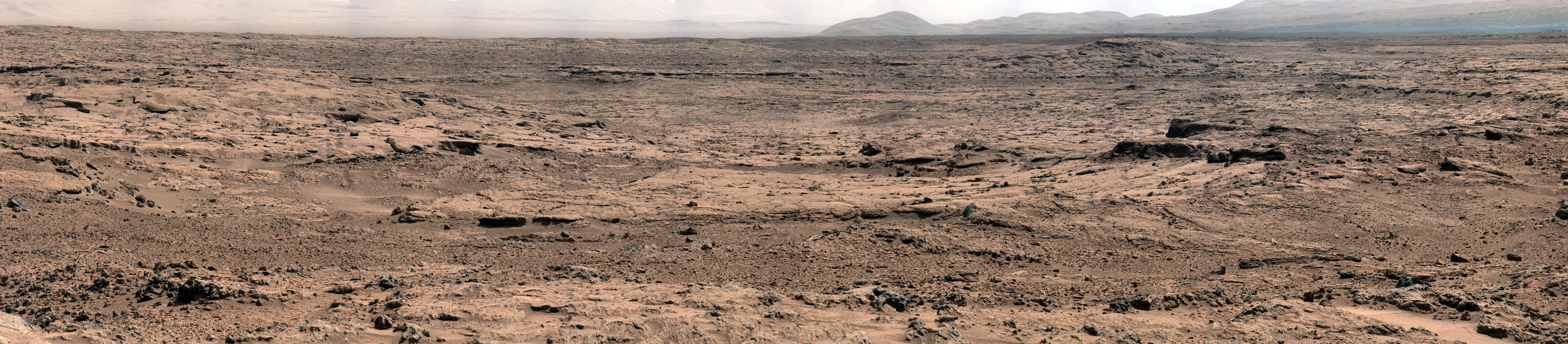
Curiosity rover's view from Rocknest looking eastward toward Point Lake (center) on the way to Glenelg Intrigue (November 26, 2012, white balanced) (raw color).

== See also ==
- Aeolis quadrangle
- Composition of Mars
- Geology of Mars
- List of rocks on Mars
- Timeline of Mars Science Laboratory
