= Glenelg, Mars =

Location on Mars

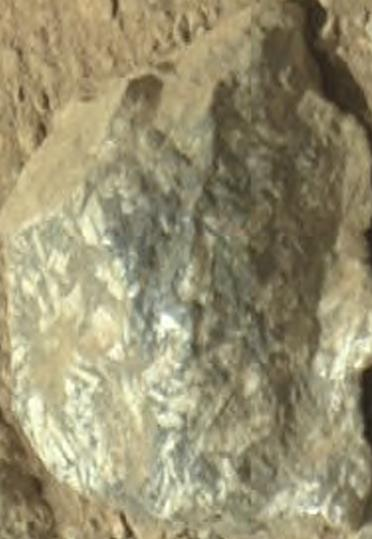
Rock found on Sol 27

Glenelg (or Glenelg Intrigue) is a location on Mars near the Mars Science Laboratory (Curiosity rover) landing site (Bradbury Landing) in Gale Crater marked by a natural intersection of three kinds of terrain.

== Name ==
The location was named Glenelg by NASA scientists for two reasons: all features in the immediate vicinity were given names associated with Yellowknife in northern Canada, and Glenelg is the name of a geological feature there. Furthermore, the name is a palindrome, and as the Curiosity rover is planned to visit the location twice (once coming, and once going) this was an appealing feature for the name. The original Glenelg is a village in Scotland which on 20 October 2012 had a ceremony, including a live link to NASA, to celebrate their "twinning" with Glenelg on Mars.

The trek to Glenelg will send the rover 400 m (1,300 ft) east-southeast of its landing site. One of the three types of terrain intersecting at Glenelg is layered bedrock, which is attractive as the first drilling target.

== Images ==
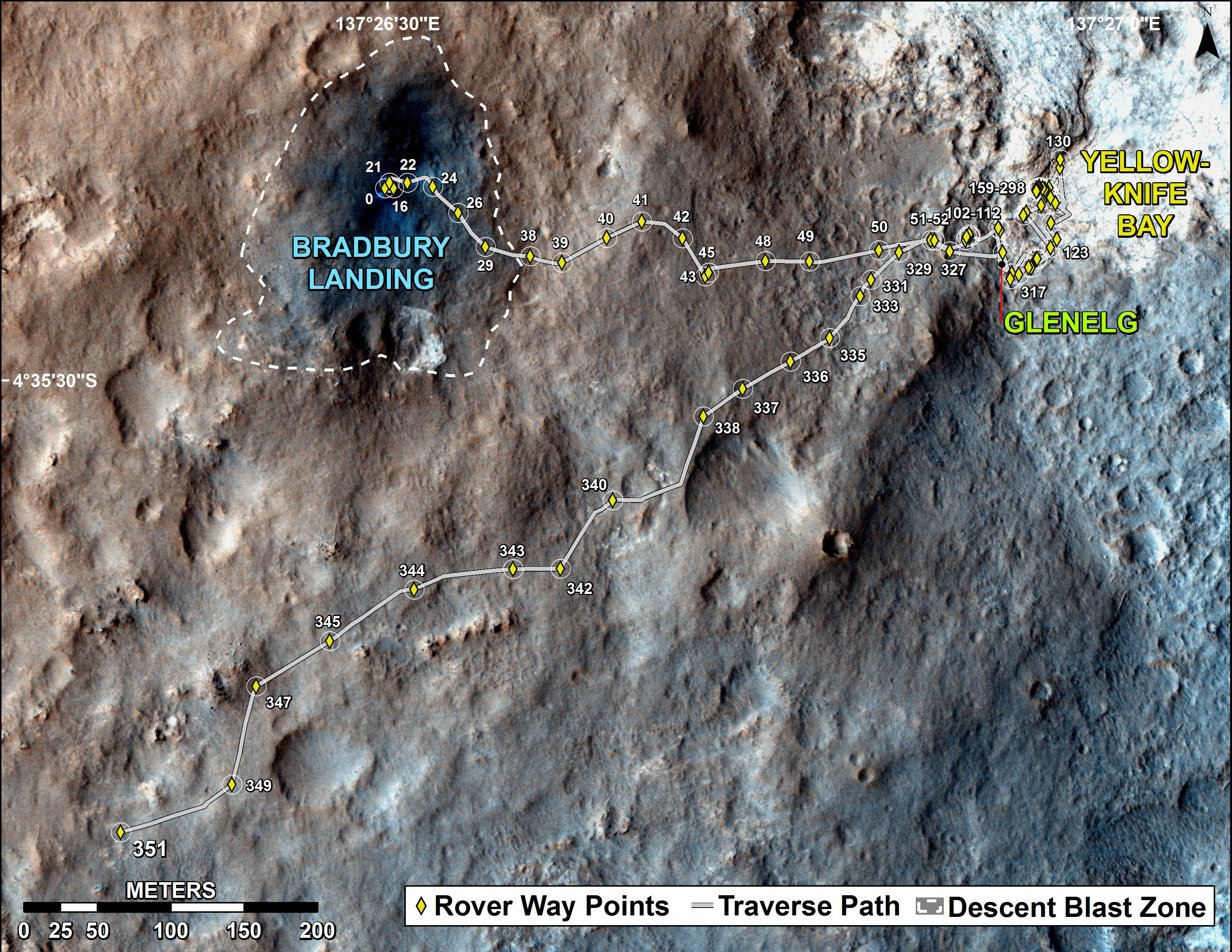
First-year and first-mile traverse map of the Curiosity rover on Mars (1 August 2013) (3-D).

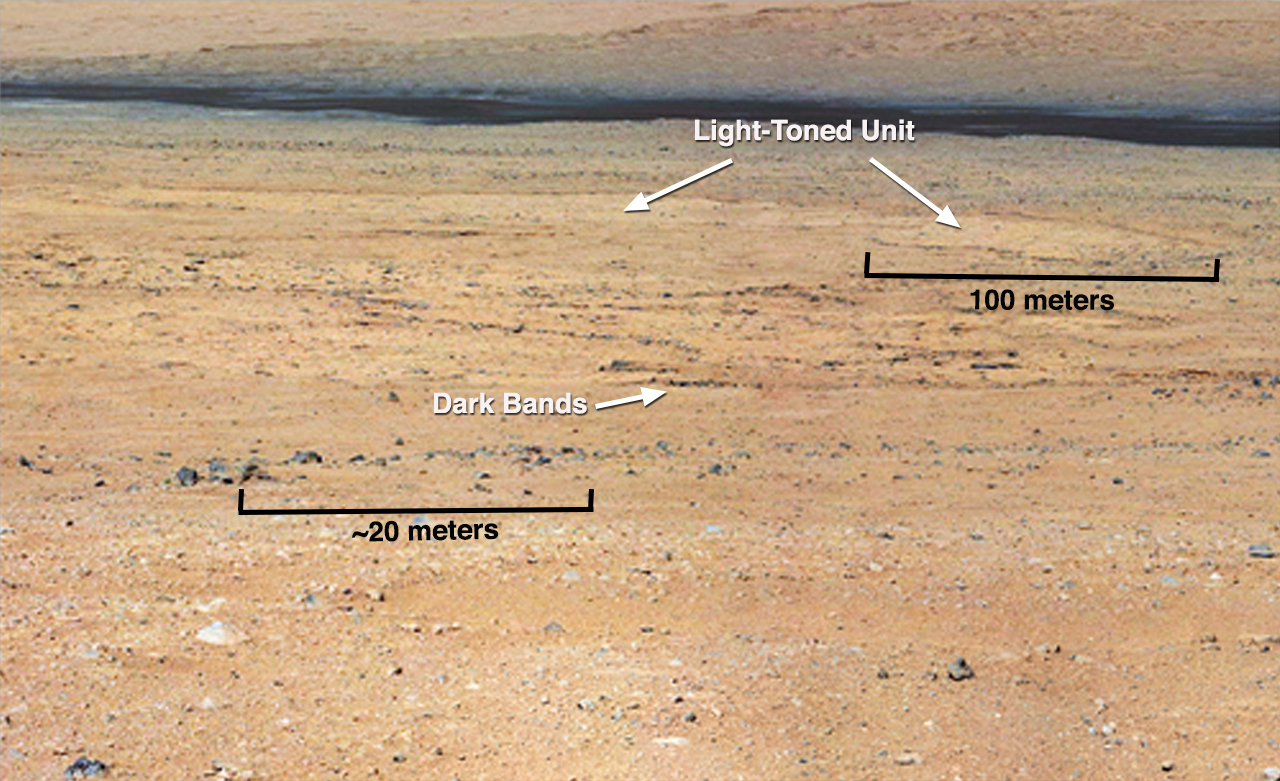
Curiosity's view of the Glenelg Area – where three terrains merge (19 September 2012).

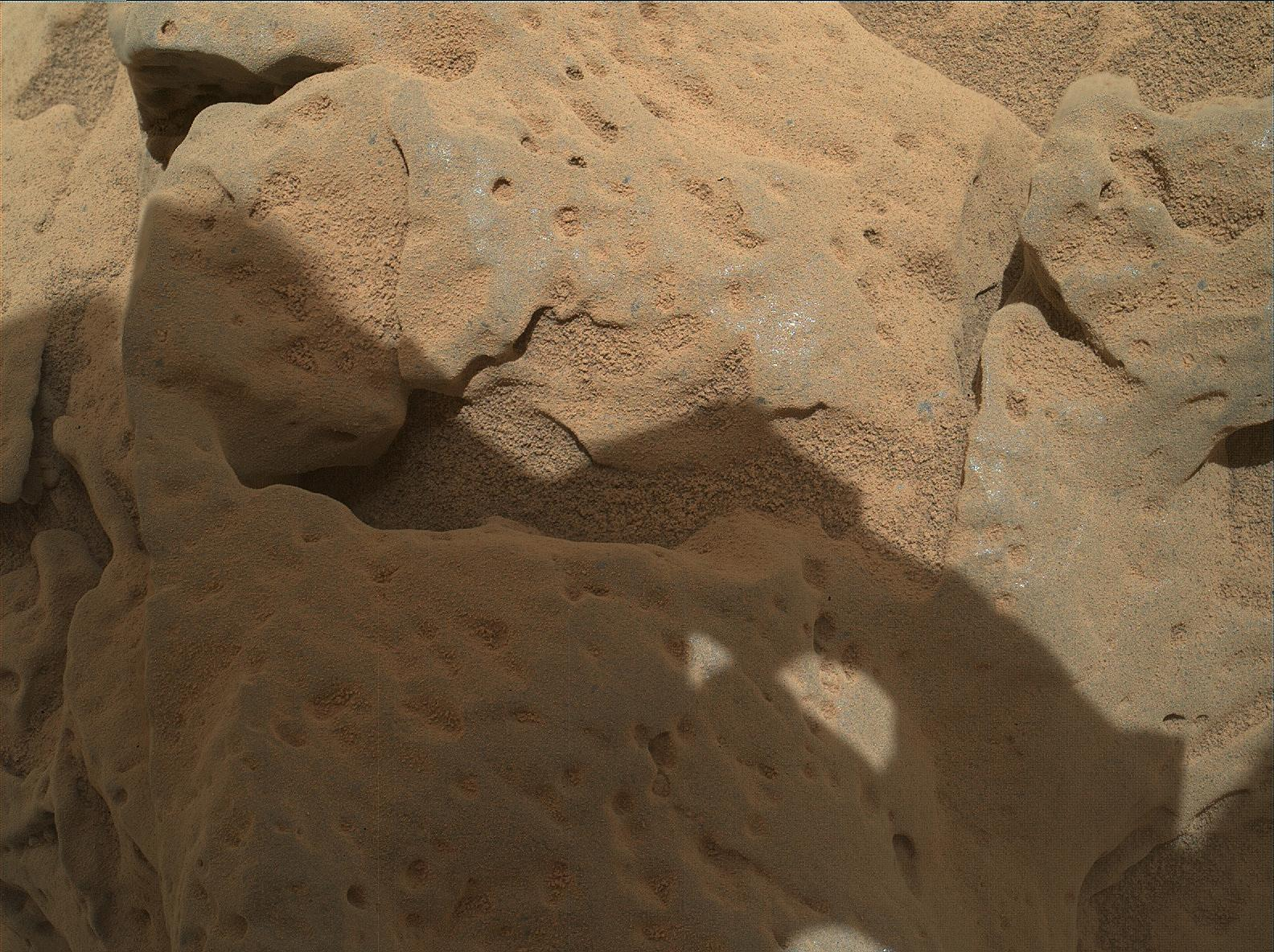
"Burwash" rock on Mars - as viewed by the MAHLI camera on the Curiosity rover (29 October 2012).

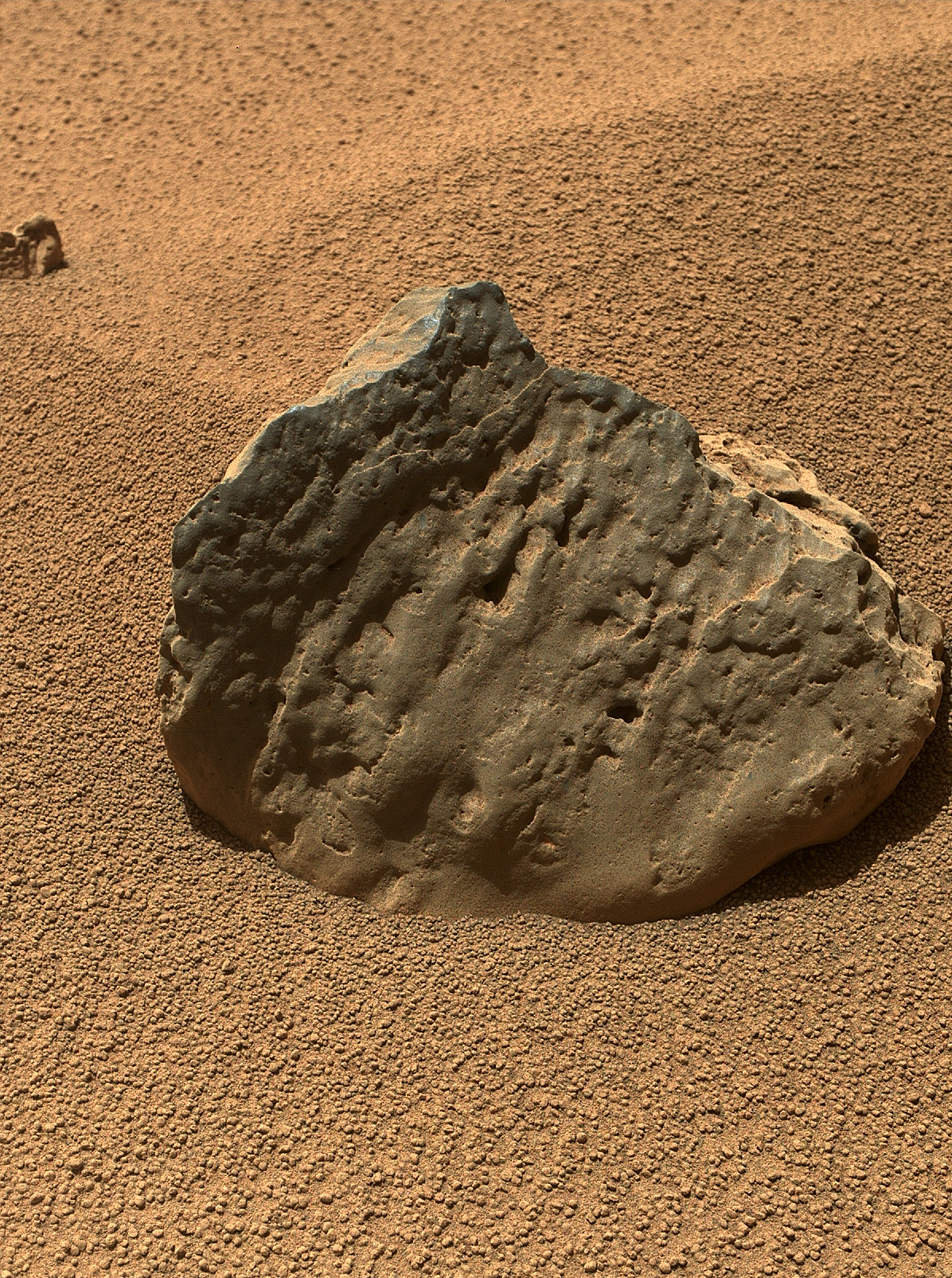
"Et-Then" rock on Mars - as viewed by the MAHLI camera on the Curiosity rover (29 October 2012).

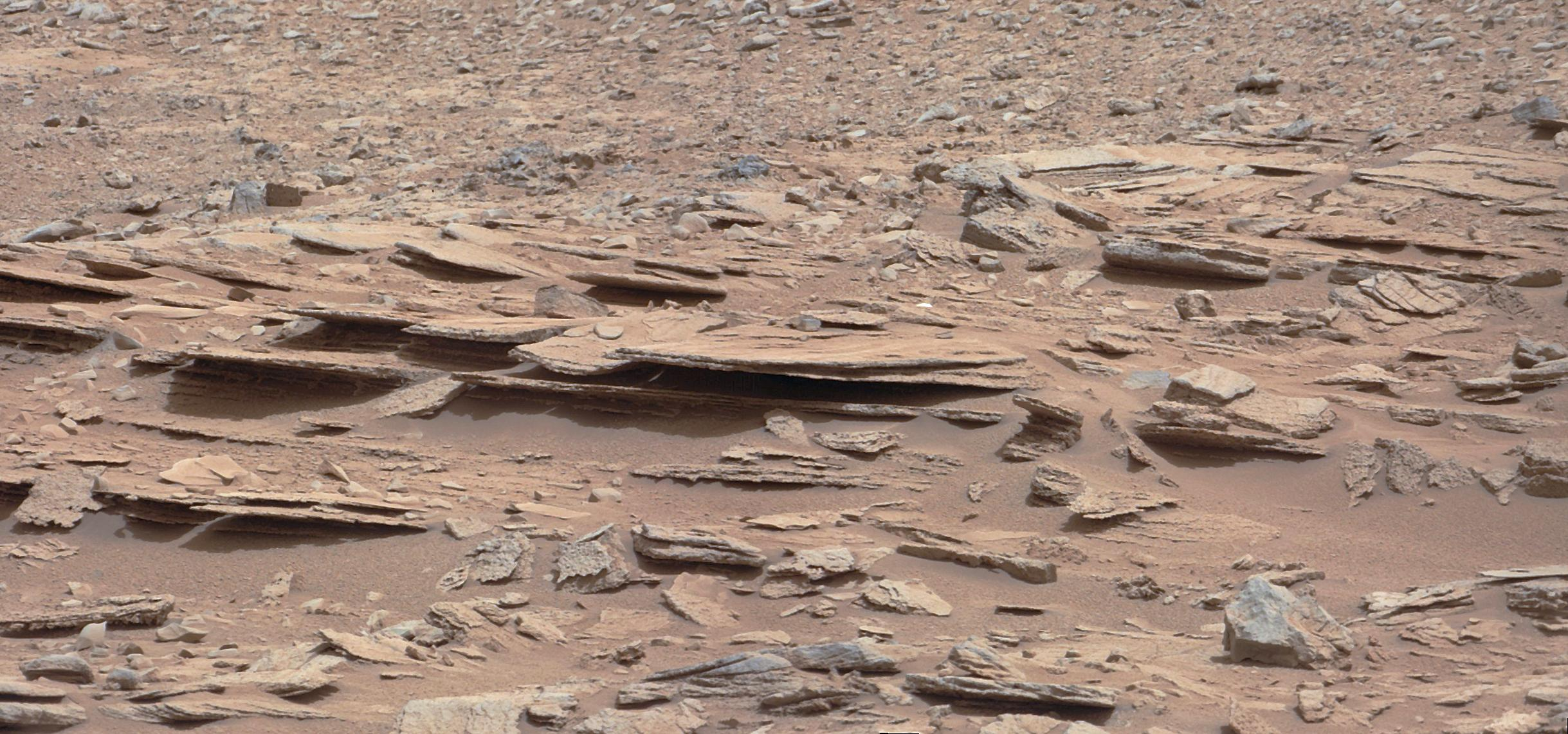
"Shaler" rock outcrop near the Glenelg Area on Mars - as viewed by the MastCam on the Curiosity rover (7 December 2012).
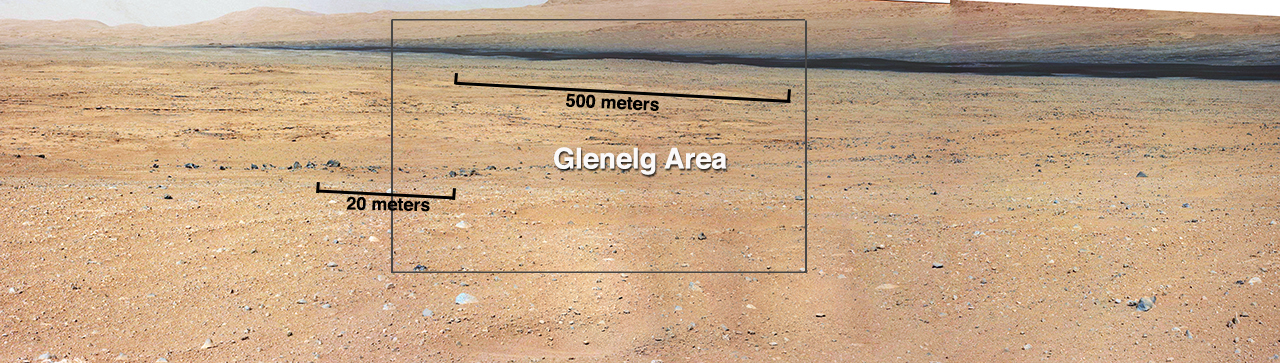
Curiosity's view of the Glenelg Area - from about 200 m (660 ft) away (19 September 2012).
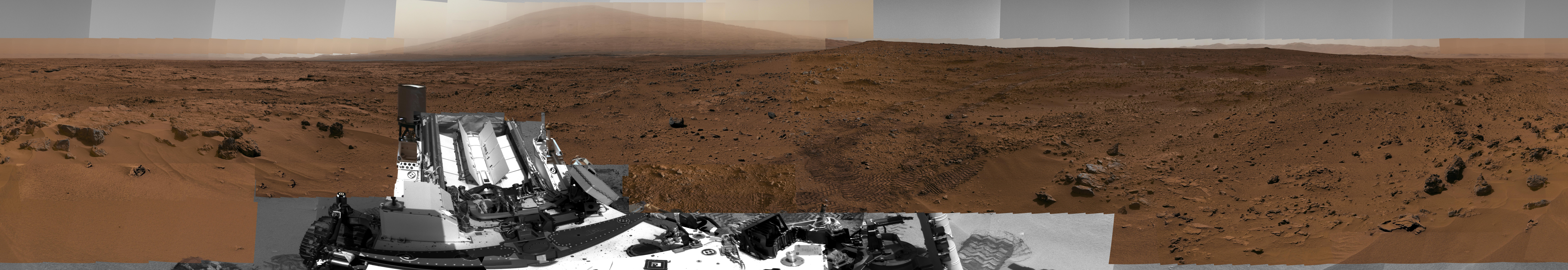
Curiosity's view of the "Rocknest" area - South is center/North at both ends; "Mount Sharp" at SE horizon (somewhat left-of-center); "Glenelg" at East (left-of-center); rover tracks at West (right-of-center) (16 November 2012; white balanced) (raw color) (interactives).
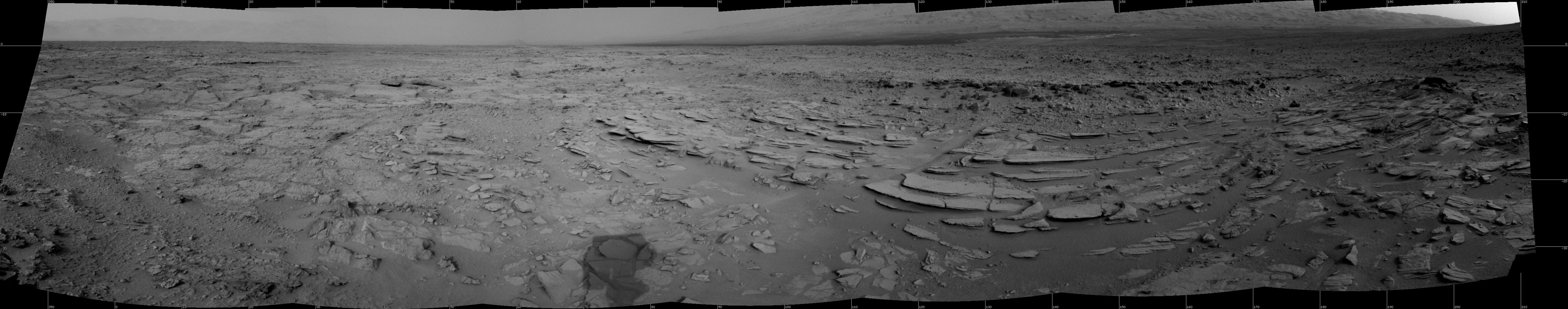
Curiosity's view of the "Shaler" rock outcrop (foreground) near the Glenelg Area [NNW/left; West/center; SSW/right] (7 December 2012) (3-D).
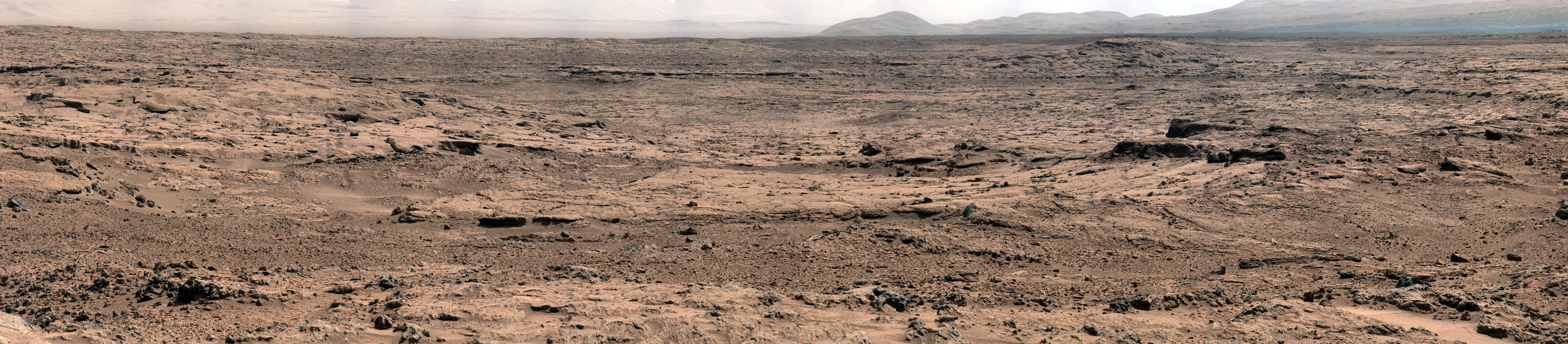
Curiosity's view of rocks looking from "Rocknest" toward "Point Lake" on the way to the Glenelg Area [East/center] (26 November 2012; white balanced) (raw color).
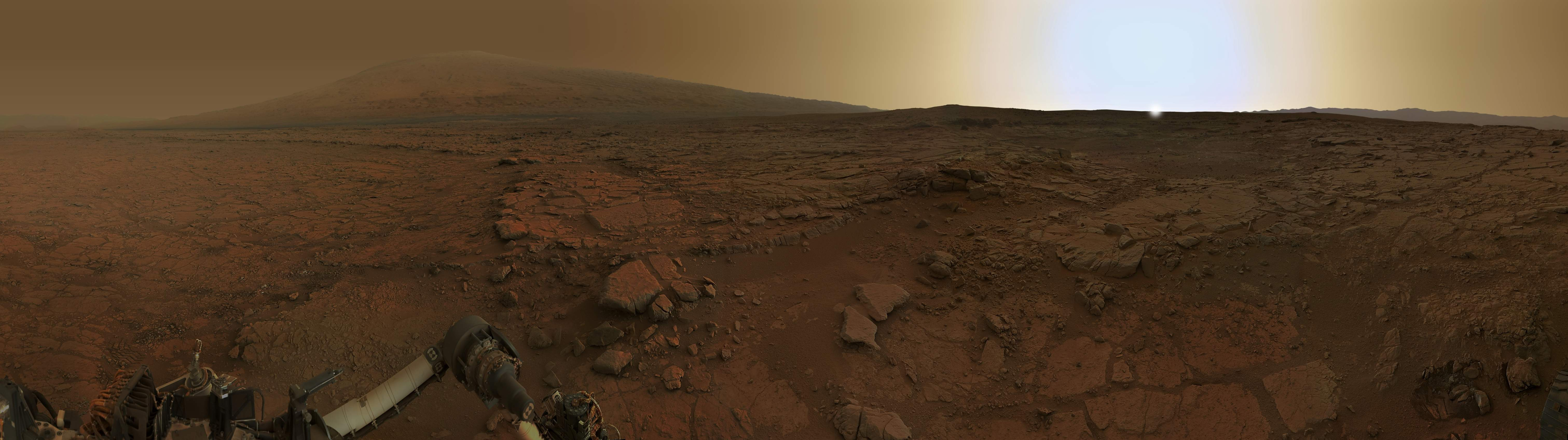
Curiosity's view of Mars sky at sunset (February 2013; Sun simulated by artist).

== See also ==
- Aeolis Mons
- Aeolis Palus
- Aeolis quadrangle
- Bedrock
- Composition of Mars
- Geology of Mars
- List of rocks on Mars
- Rock outcrop
- Timeline of Mars Science Laboratory
- Water on Mars
