= Rocknest (Mars) =

Sandpatch

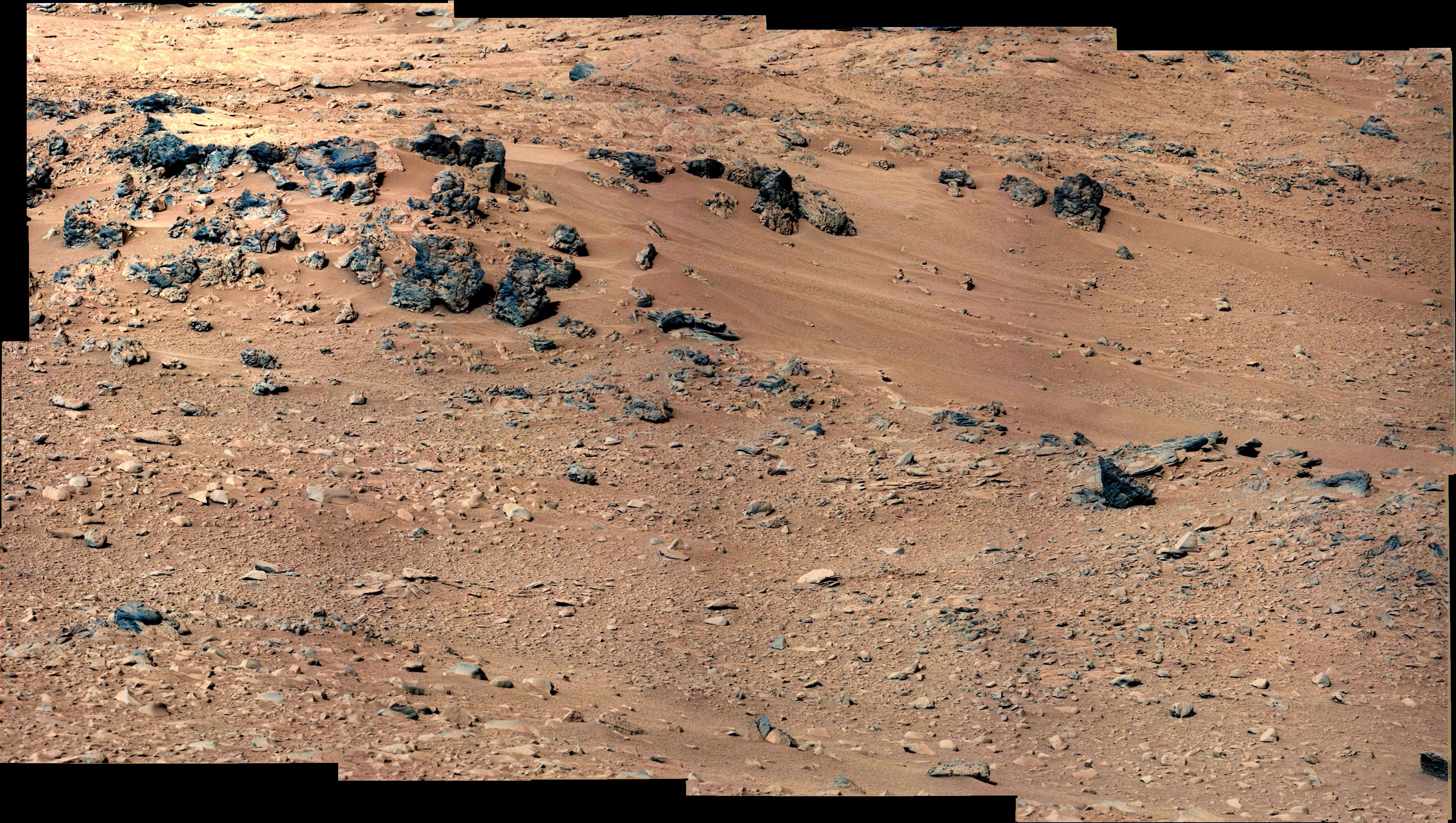
- Rocknest sand patch on Mars (September 28, 2012).
- Feature type: Sand patch
- Coordinates: 4.59°S 137.44°E

Rocknest is a sand patch on the surface of Aeolis Palus, between Peace Vallis and Aeolis Mons (Mount Sharp), in Gale crater on the planet Mars. The patch was encountered by the Curiosity rover on the way from Bradbury Landing to Glenelg Intrigue on September 28, 2012. The approximate site coordinates are: 4.59°S 137.44°E.

The sand patch is downhill from a cluster of dark rocks. NASA determined the patch to be the location for the first use of the scoop on the arm of the Mars Curiosity rover. The Rocknest patch is about 1.5 m (4.9 ft) by 5 m (16 ft).

== Discovery and material analysis ==
On October 7, 2012, a mysterious bright object (image), discovered in the sand at Rocknest, drew scientific interest. Several close-up pictures (close-up 1) (close-up 2) were taken of the object and preliminary interpretations by scientists suggest the object to be "debris from the spacecraft". Nonetheless, further images in the nearby sand have detected other bright particles (image) (close-up 1). These newly discovered objects are presently thought to be native Martian material.

On October 17, 2012, at Rocknest, the first X-ray diffraction analysis of Martian soil was performed. The results from the rover's CheMin analyzer revealed the presence of several minerals, including feldspar, pyroxenes and olivine, and suggested that the Martian soil in the sample was similar to the weathered basaltic soils of Hawaiian volcanoes.

On September 26, 2013, NASA scientists reported the Mars Curiosity rover detected "abundant, easily accessible" water (1.5 to 3 weight percent) in soil samples at the Rocknest region of Aeolis Palus in Gale Crater. In addition, NASA reported the rover found two principal soil types: a fine-grained mafic type and a locally derived, coarse-grained felsic type. The mafic type, similar to other martian soils and martian dust, was associated with hydration of the amorphous phases of the soil. Also, perchlorates, the presence of which may make detection of life-related organic molecules difficult, were found at the Curiosity rover landing site (and earlier at the more polar site of the Phoenix lander) suggesting a "global distribution of these salts". NASA also reported that Jake M rock, a rock encountered by Curiosity on the way to Glenelg, was a mugearite and very similar to terrestrial mugearite rocks.

== Images ==
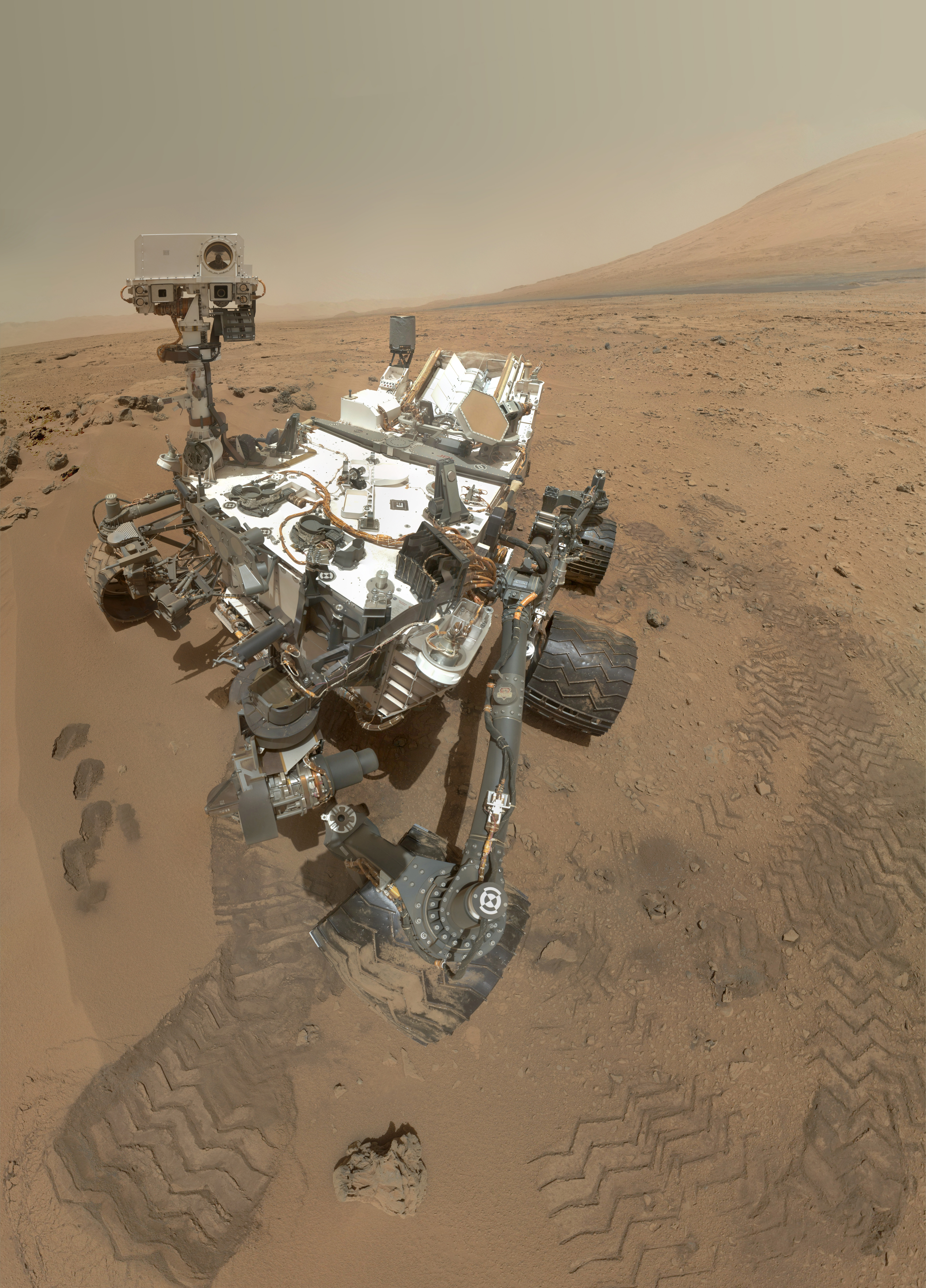
Curiosity rover self-portrait on the planet Mars at Rocknest (October 31, 2012).

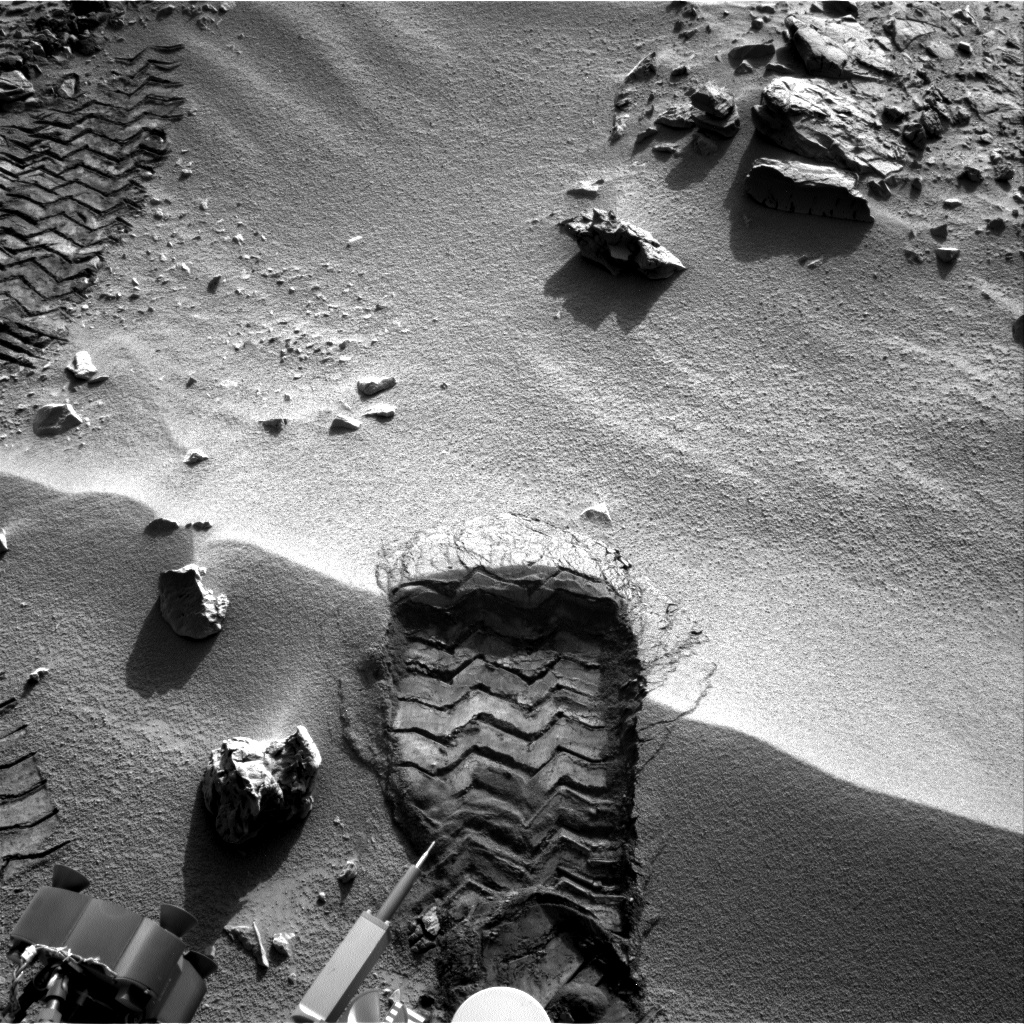
Curiosity rover wheel marks in the sand patch at the "Rocknest" site (October 3, 2012).

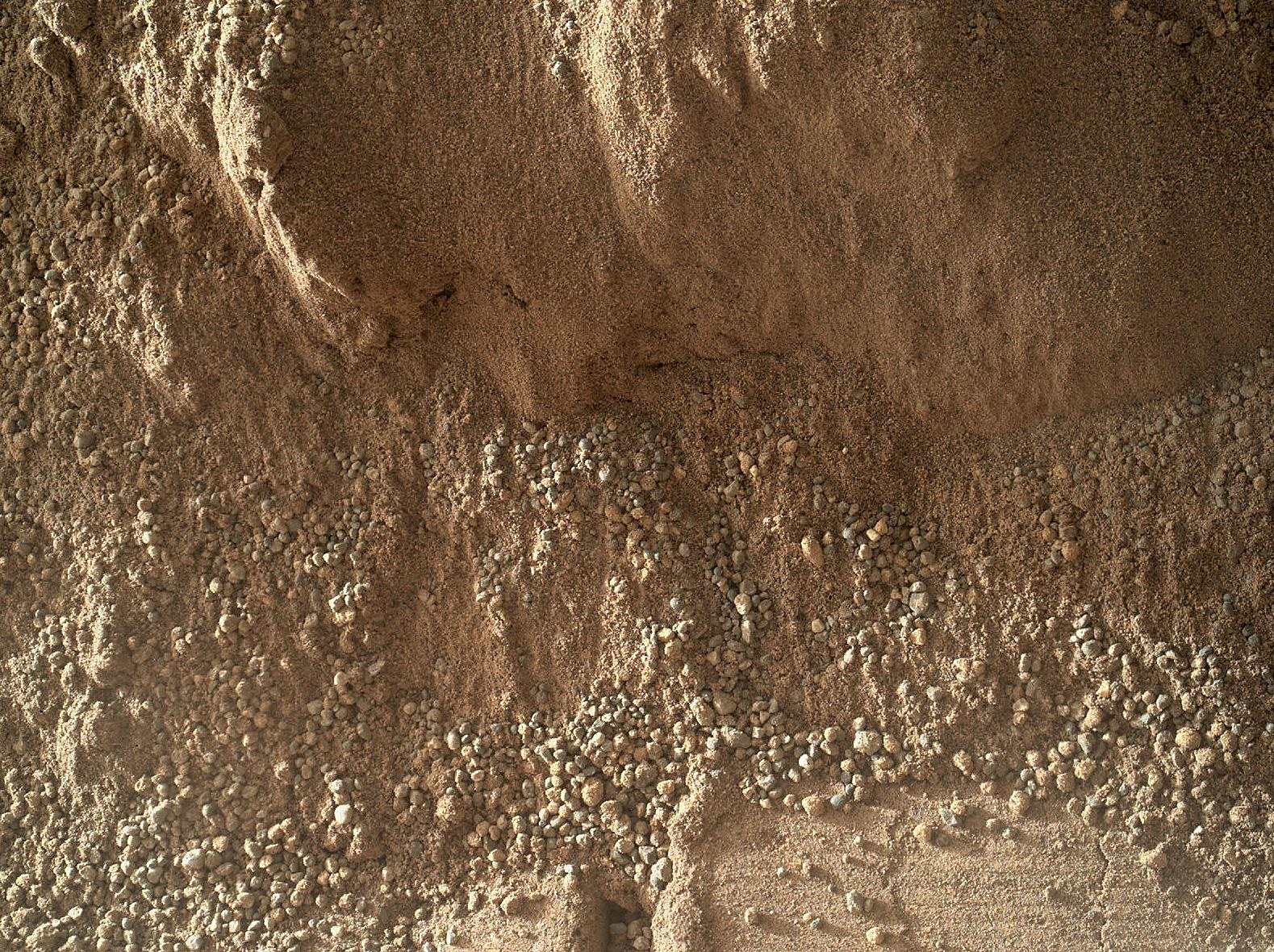
Sand on Mars – scoffmark made by Curiosity (MAHLI, October 4, 2012).

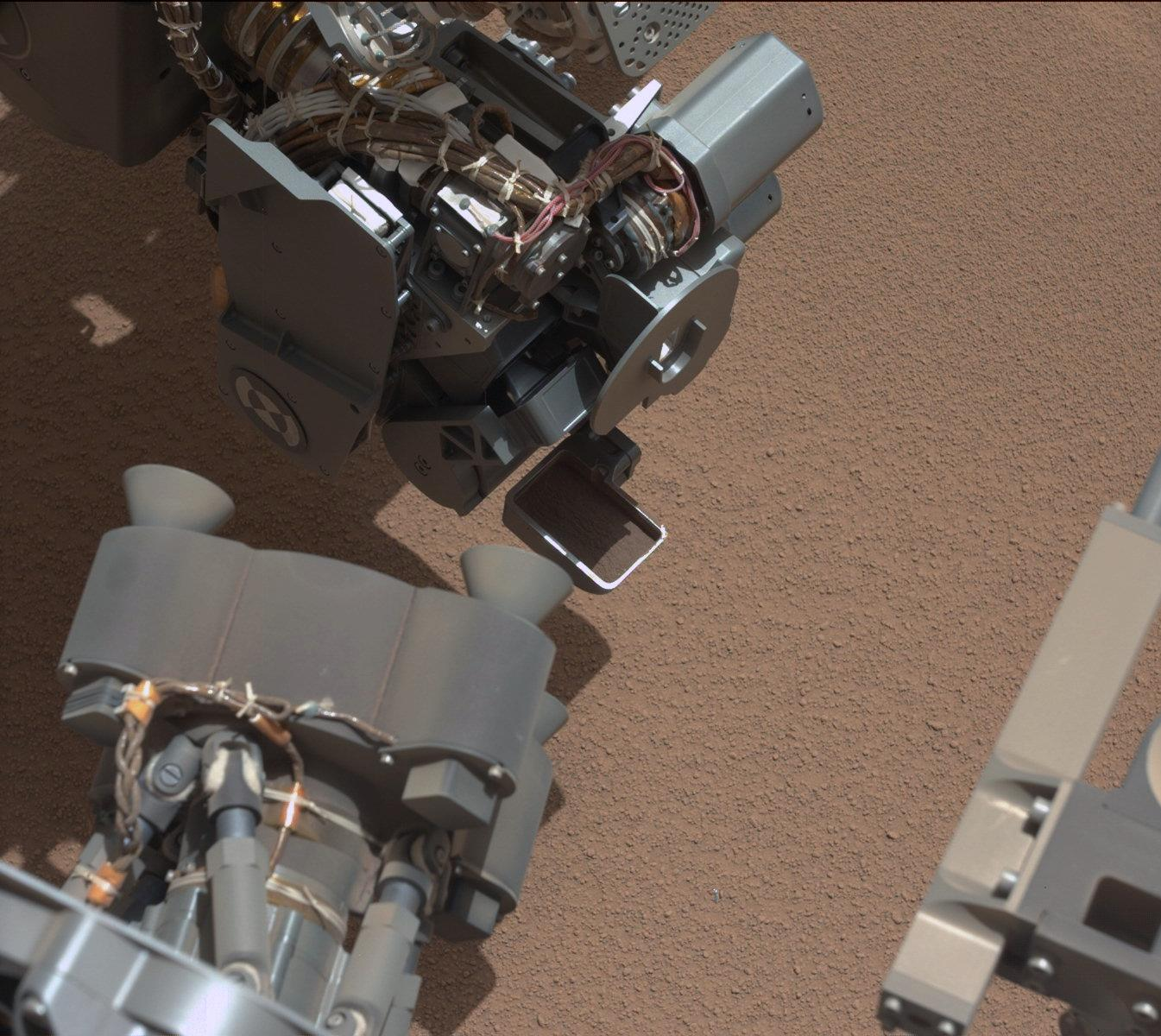
First use of the Curiosity rover scooper as it sifts a load of sand at "Rocknest" (October 7, 2012).

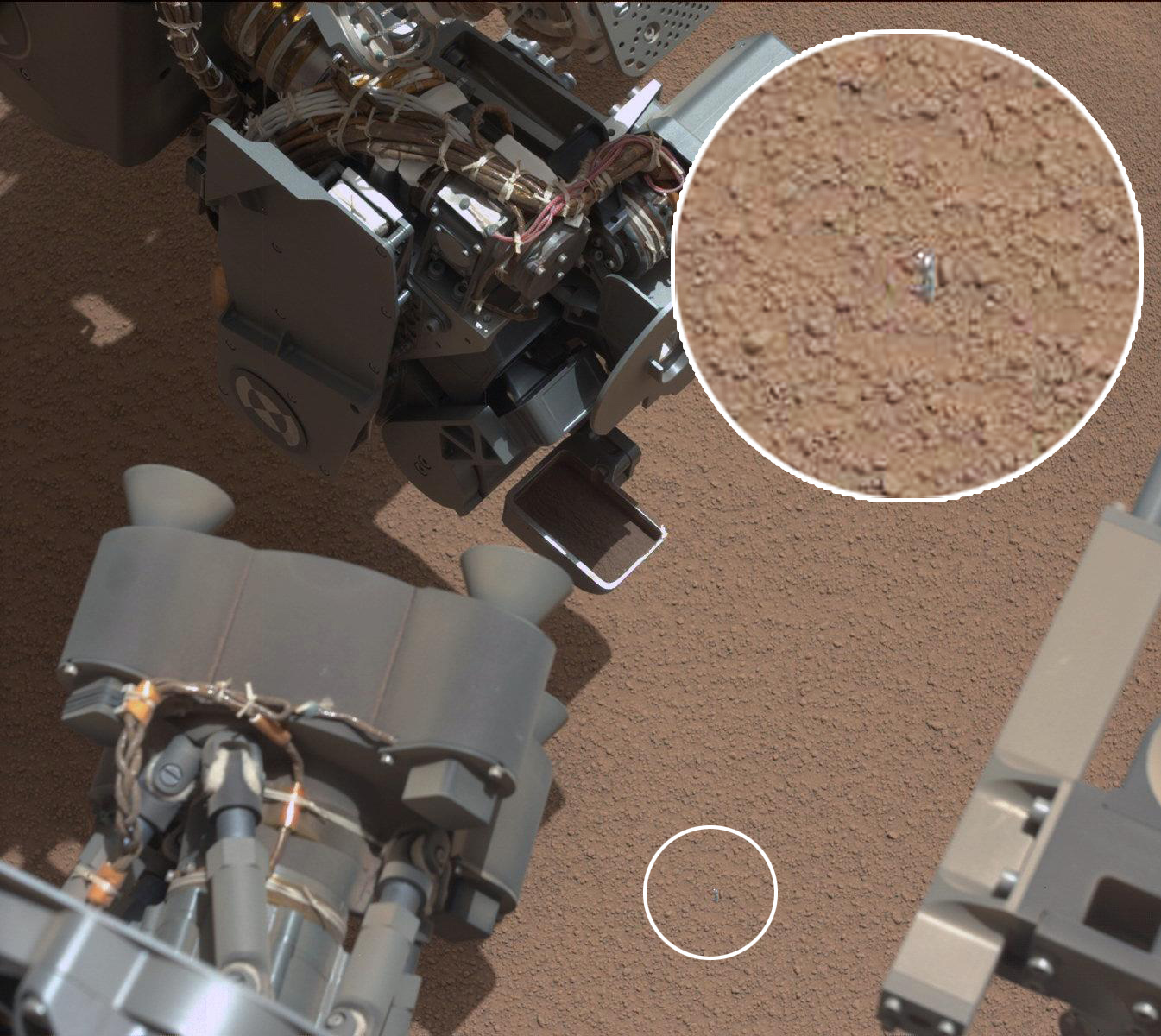
Curiosity finds a "bright object" in the sand at Rocknest (October 7, 2012) (close-up).

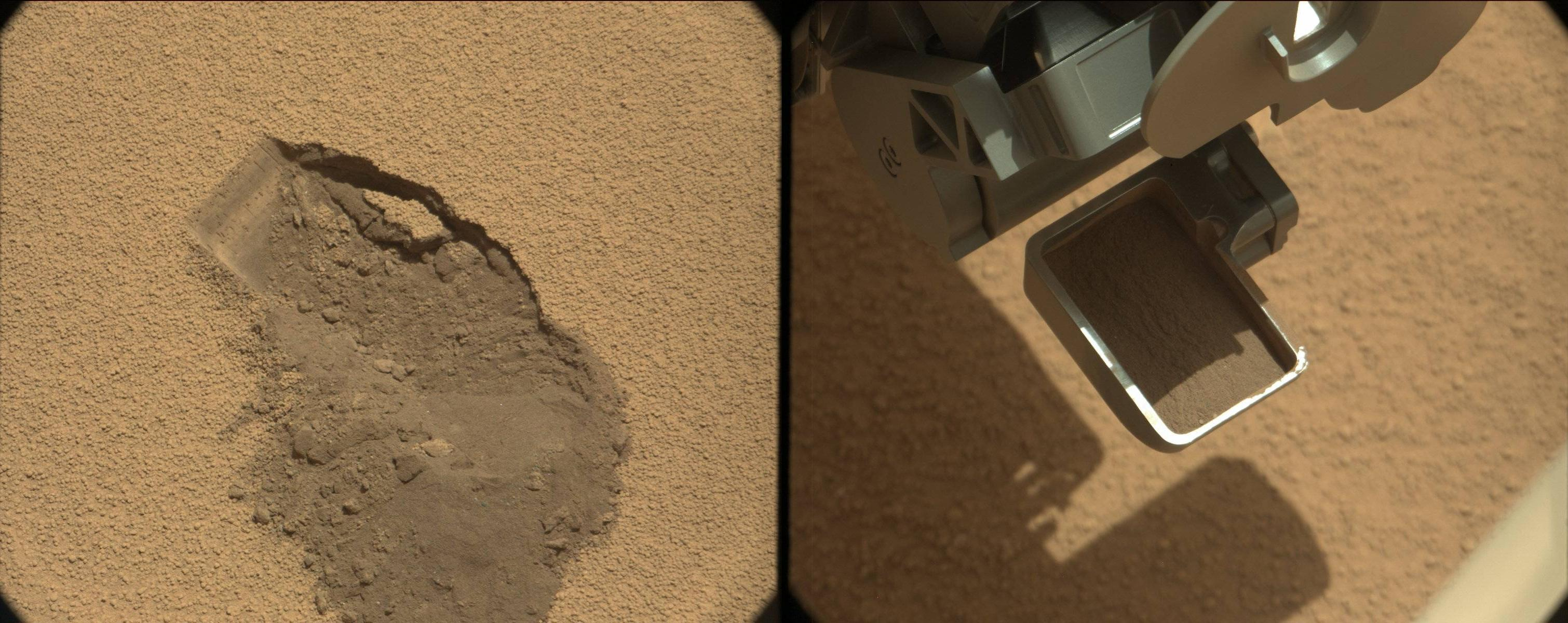
First use of the Curiosity rover scooper as it sifts a load of sand at Rocknest (October 7, 2012).

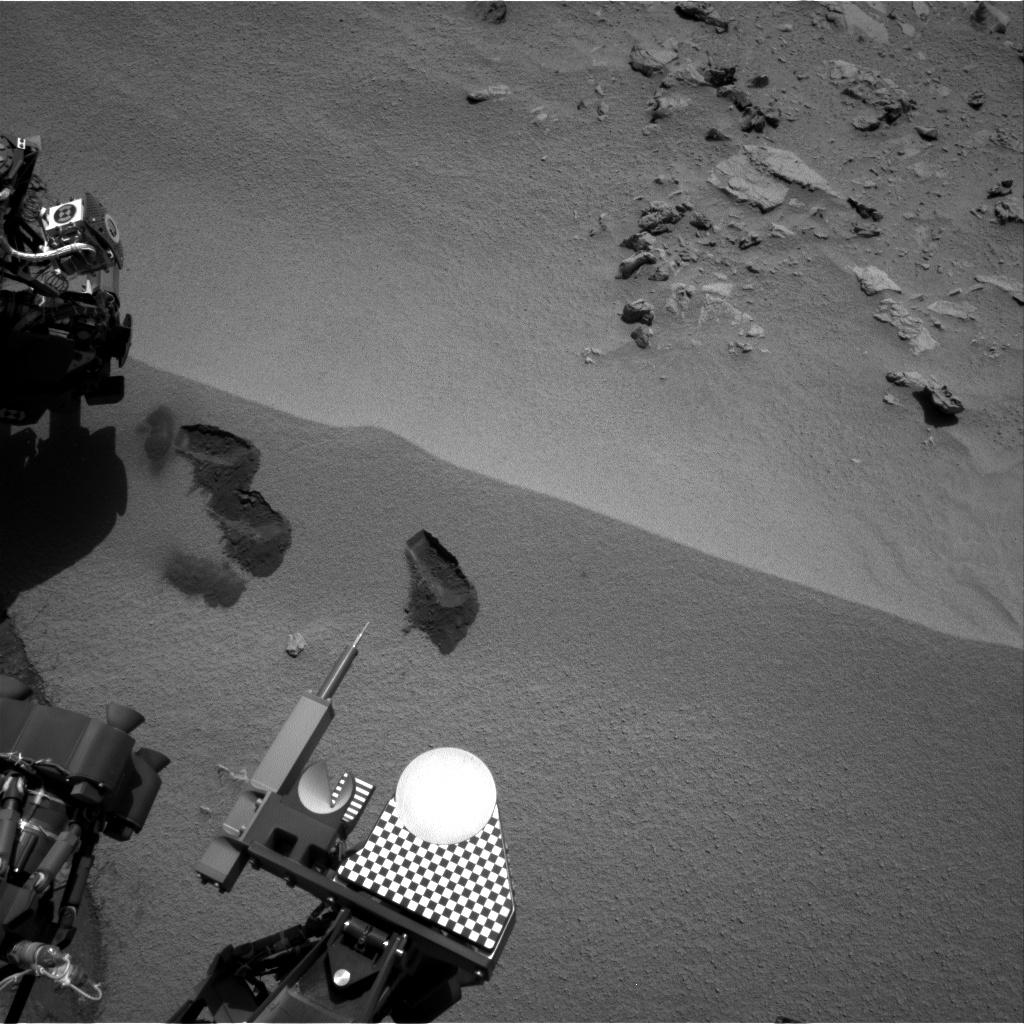
Curiosity's scoop "bite marks" in the sand patch at the Rocknest site (October 15, 2012).

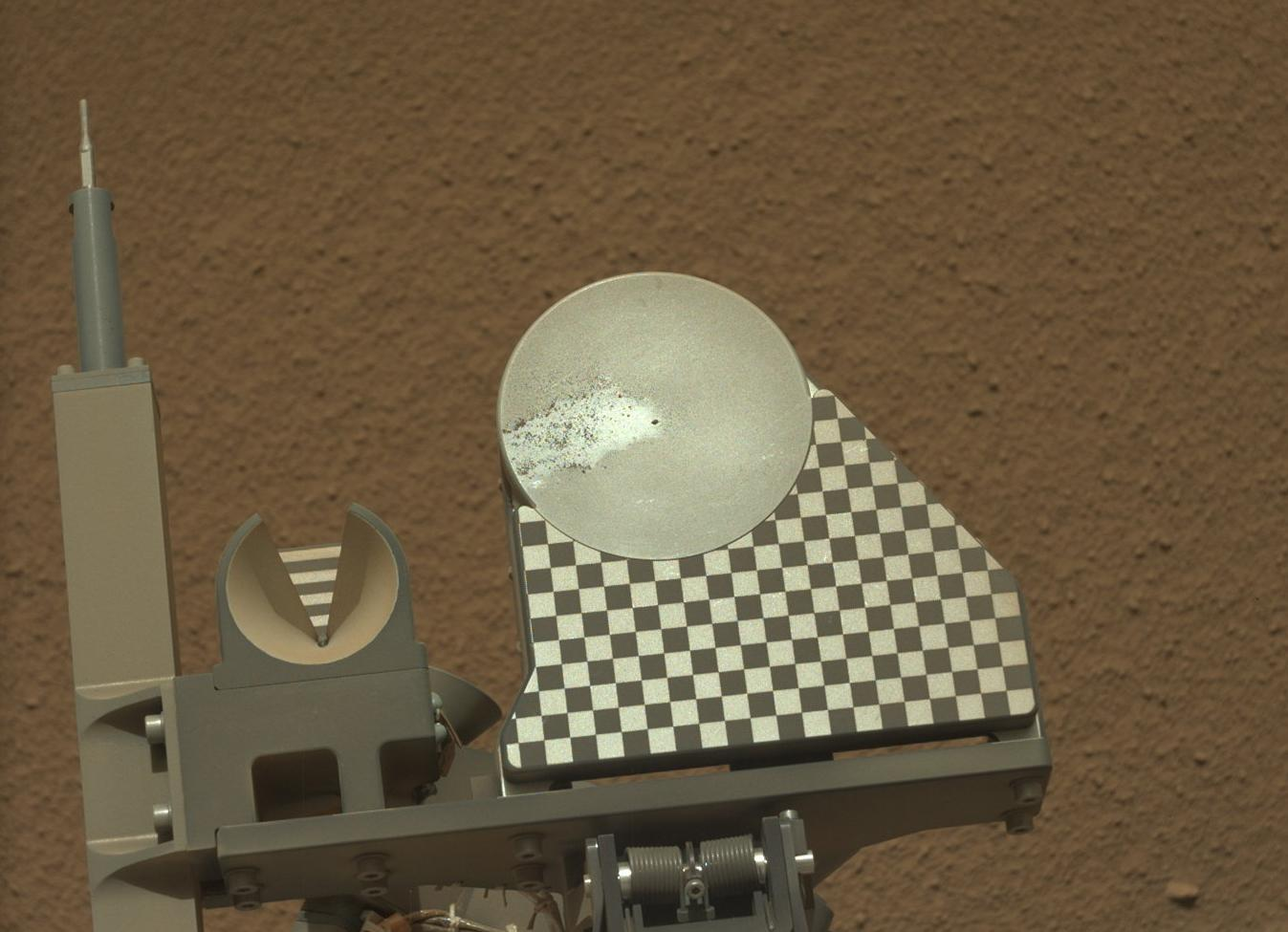
Curiosity rover scoops soil sample onto an observation tray at the Rocknest site (October 16, 2012).

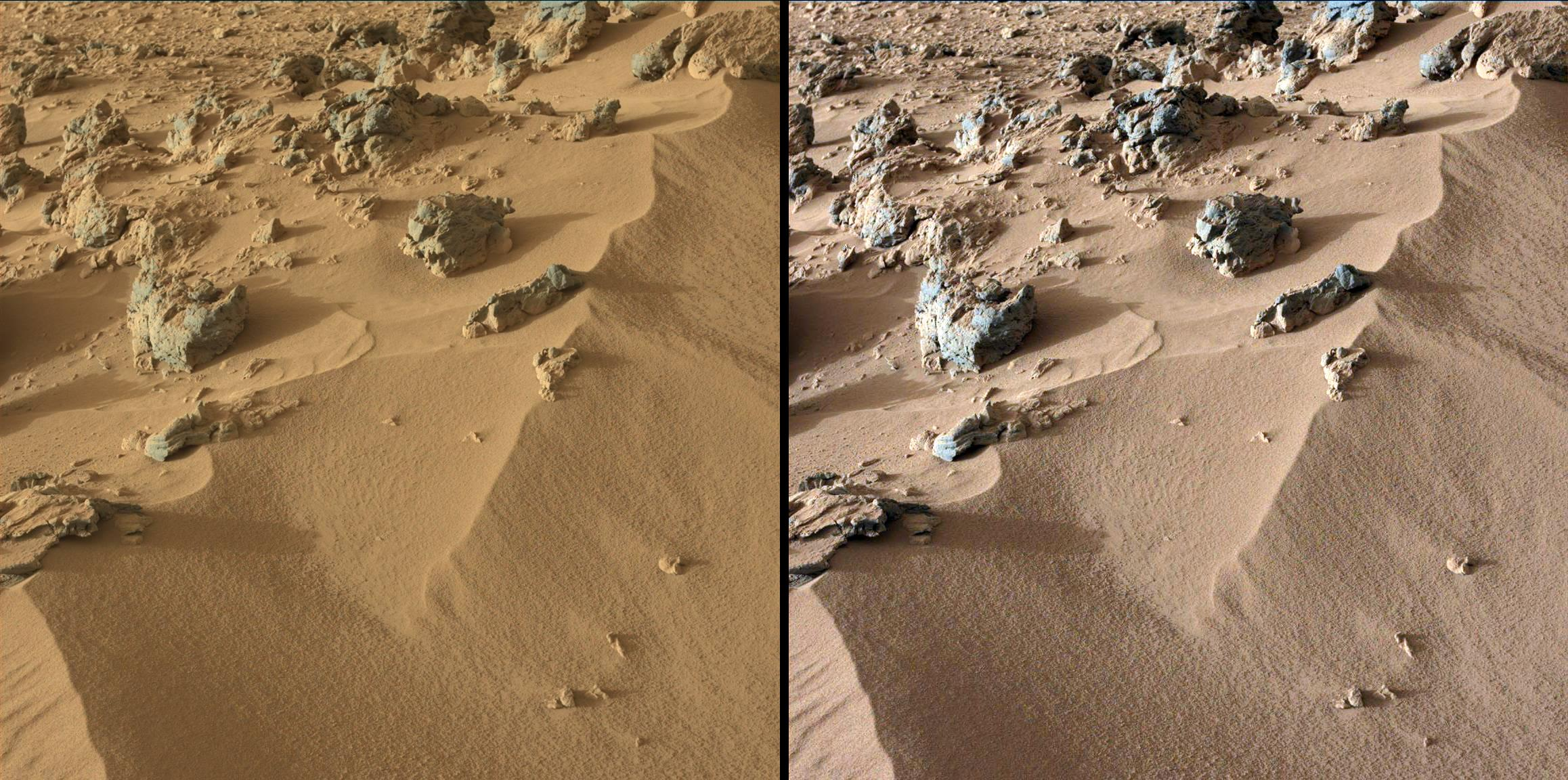
Sand at Rocknest used for the first X-ray analysis of Martian soil (Curiosity rover, October 30, 2012)

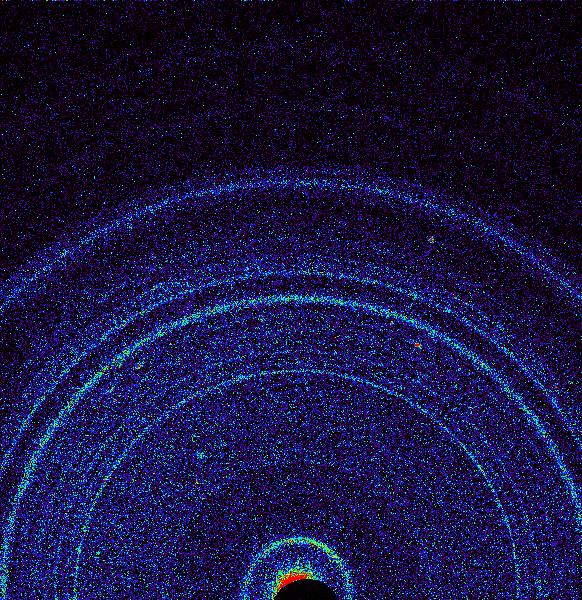
First X-ray view of Martian soil (Curiosity at Rocknest, October 17, 2012).

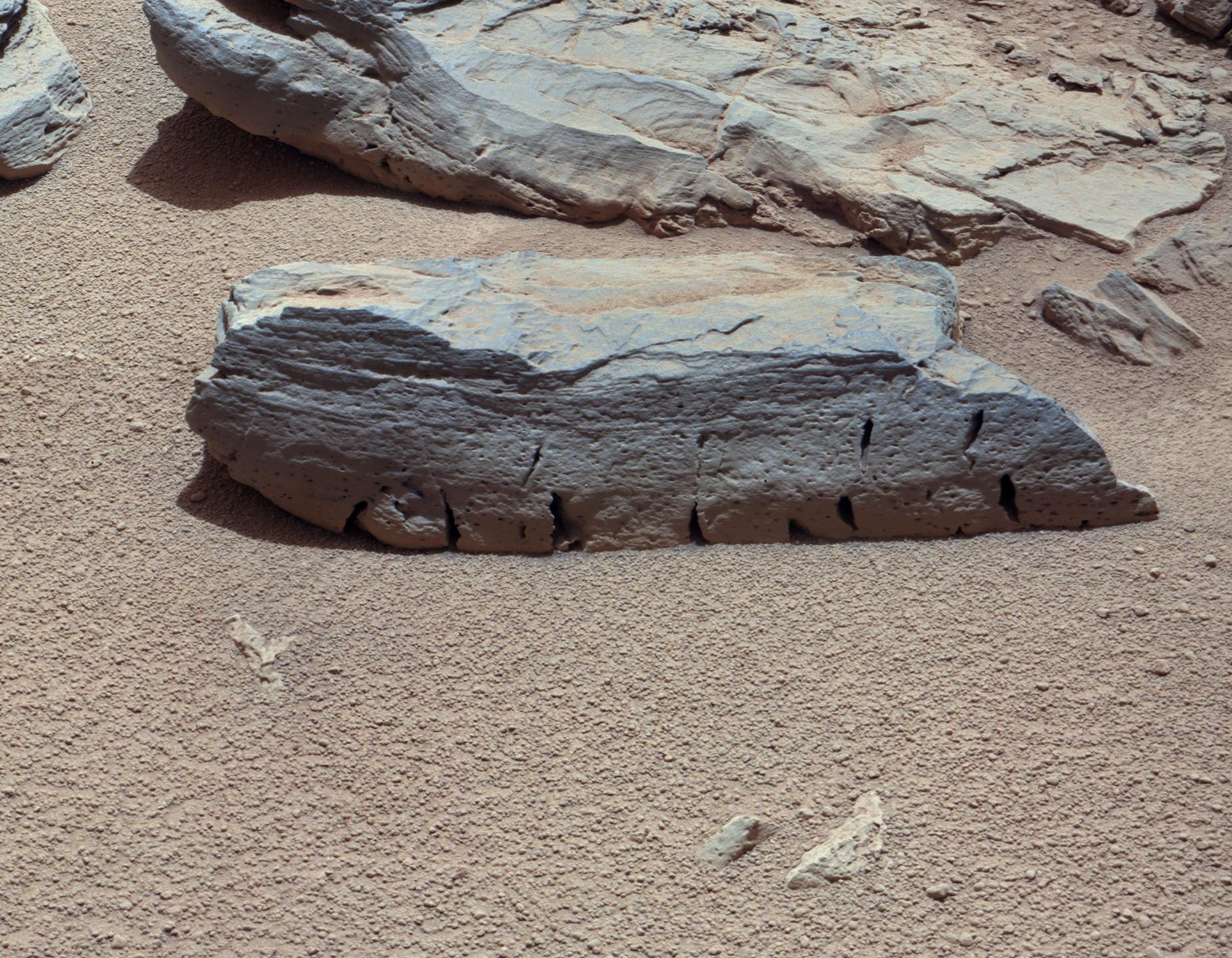
"Rocknest 3" rock - ChemCam and APSX target (Curiosity, October 5, 2012) (white-balanced image).

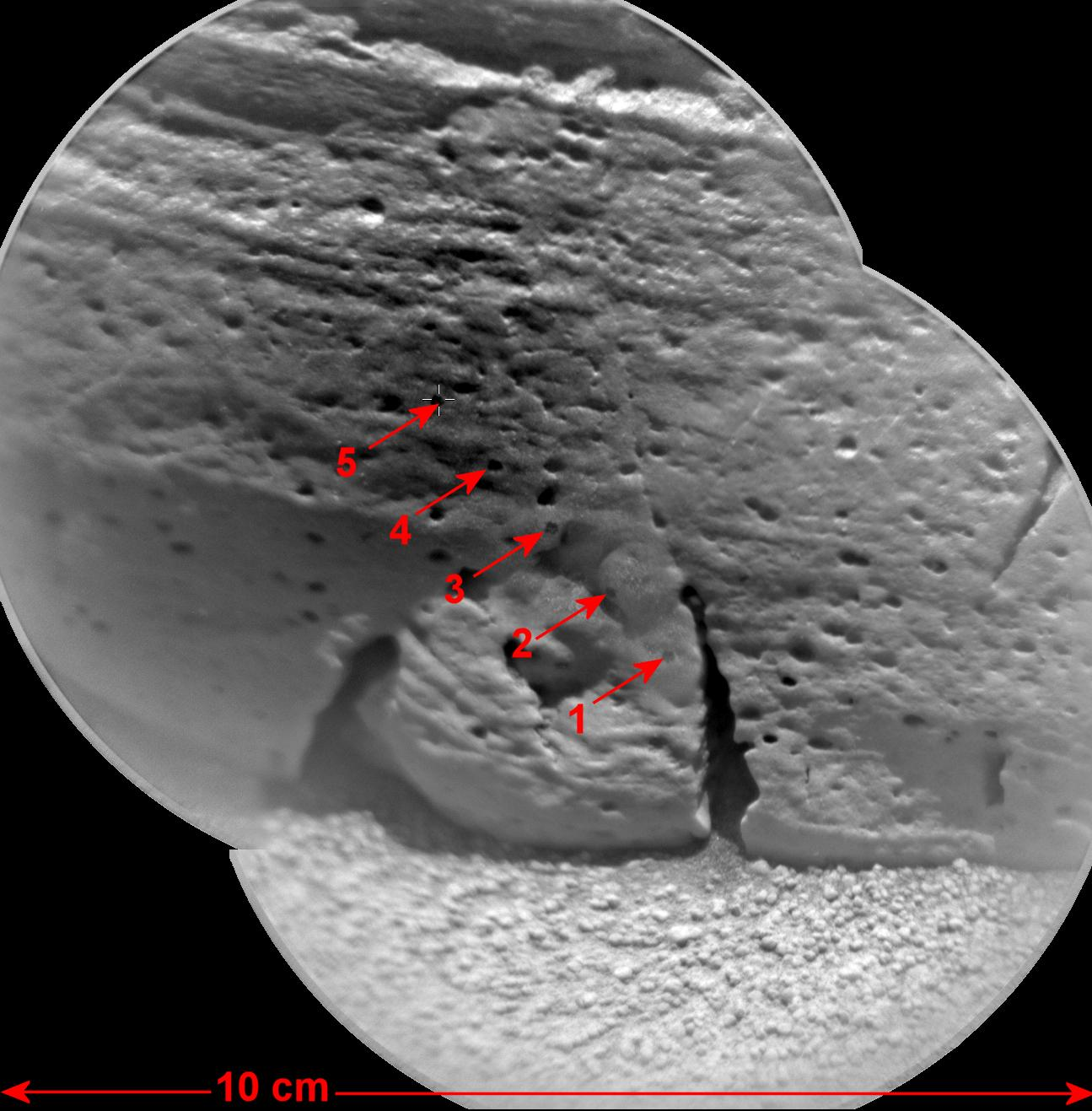
"Rocknest 3" rock – ChemCam and APSX target (Curiosity rover, October 3, 2012).
"Bright Particles" found by the Curiosity rover
at Rocknest (October, 2012)

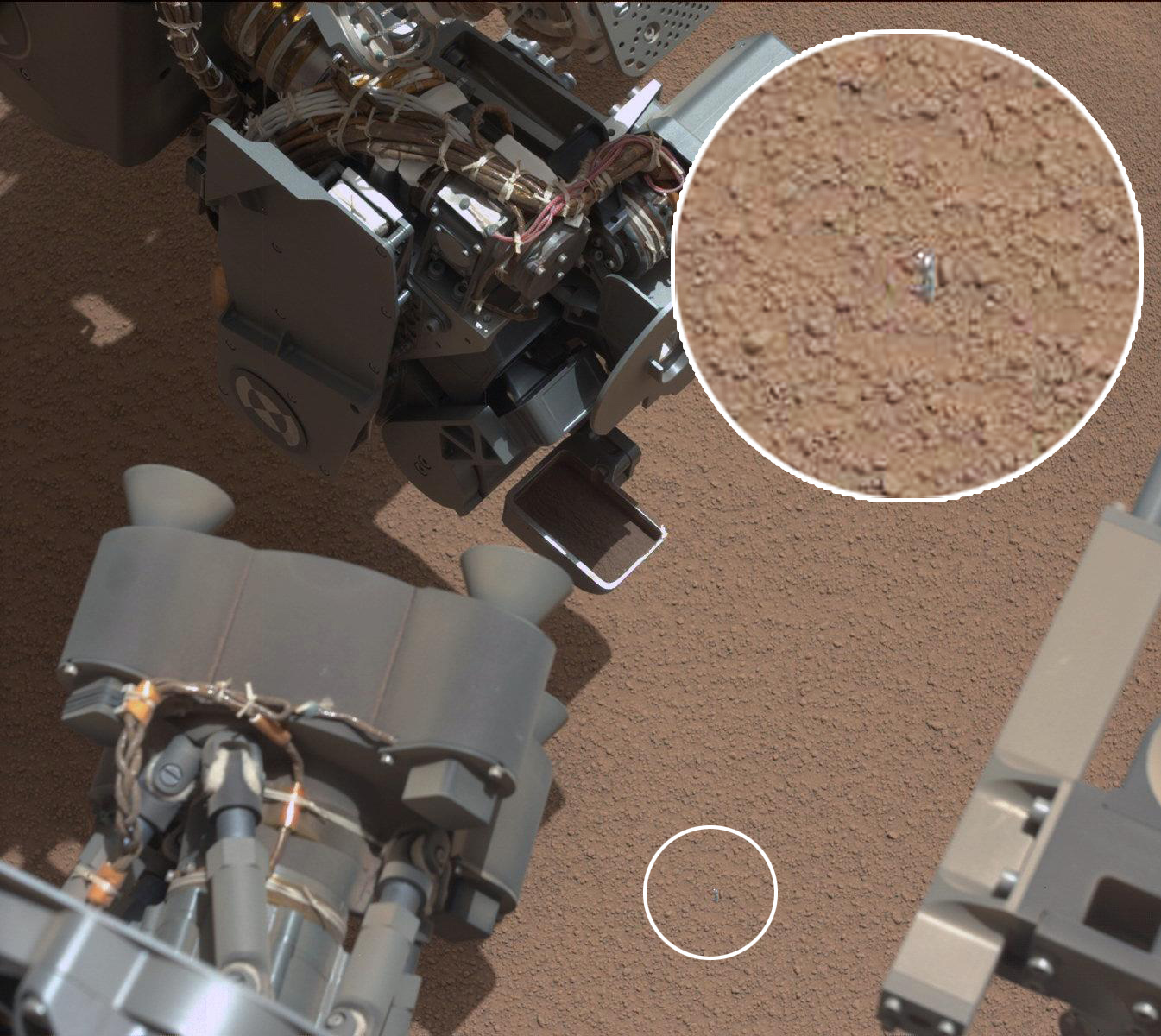
"Bright Object"

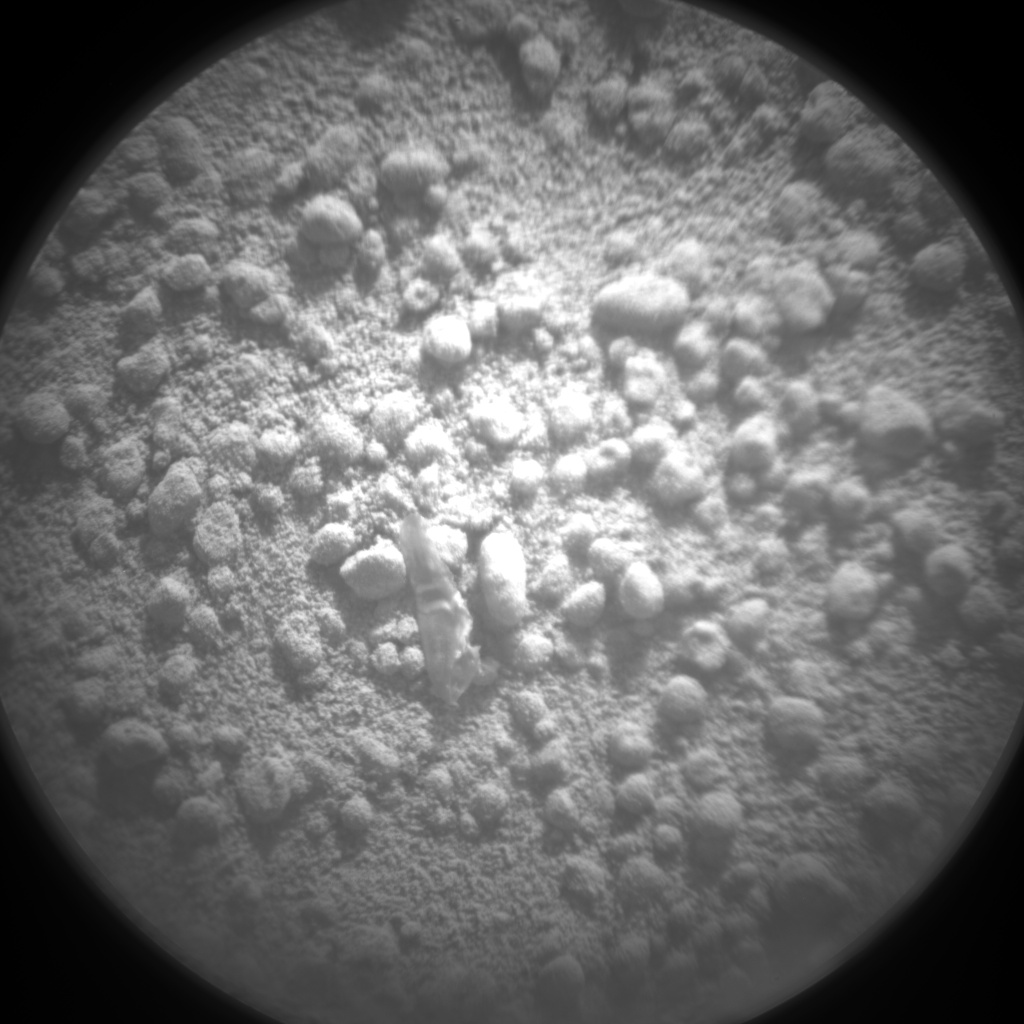
BO Close-up 1

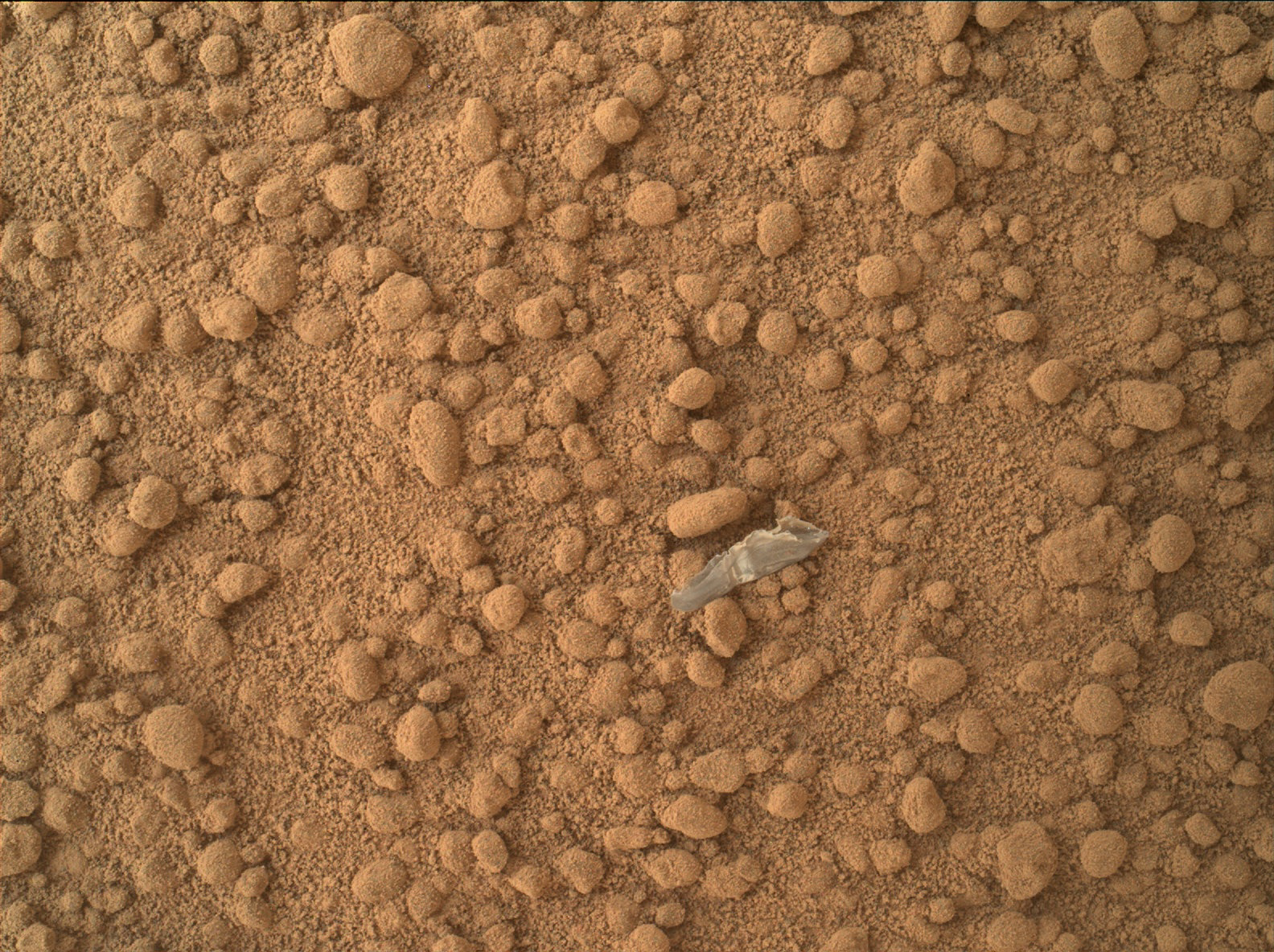
BO Close-up 2

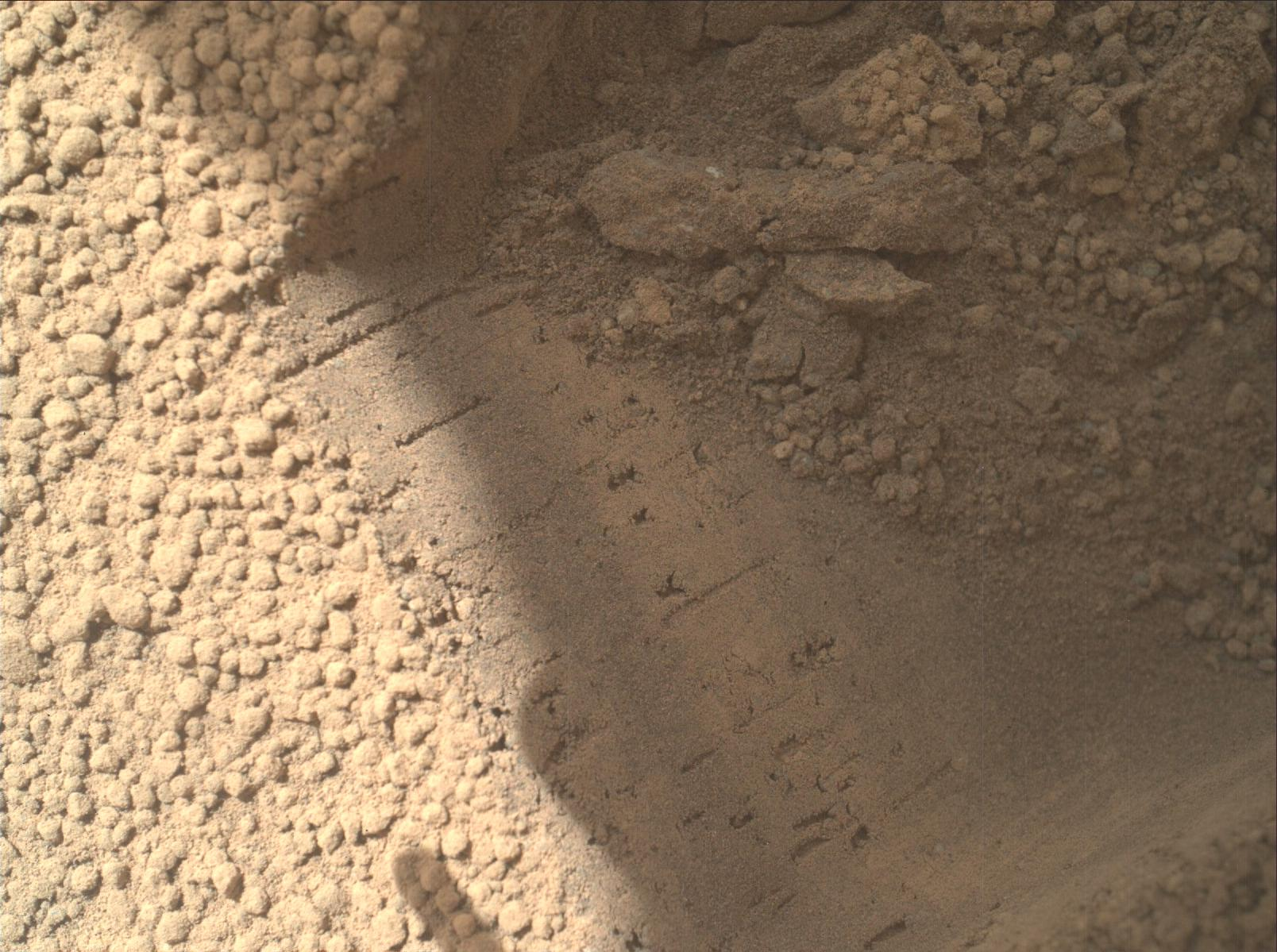
"Bright Particles"

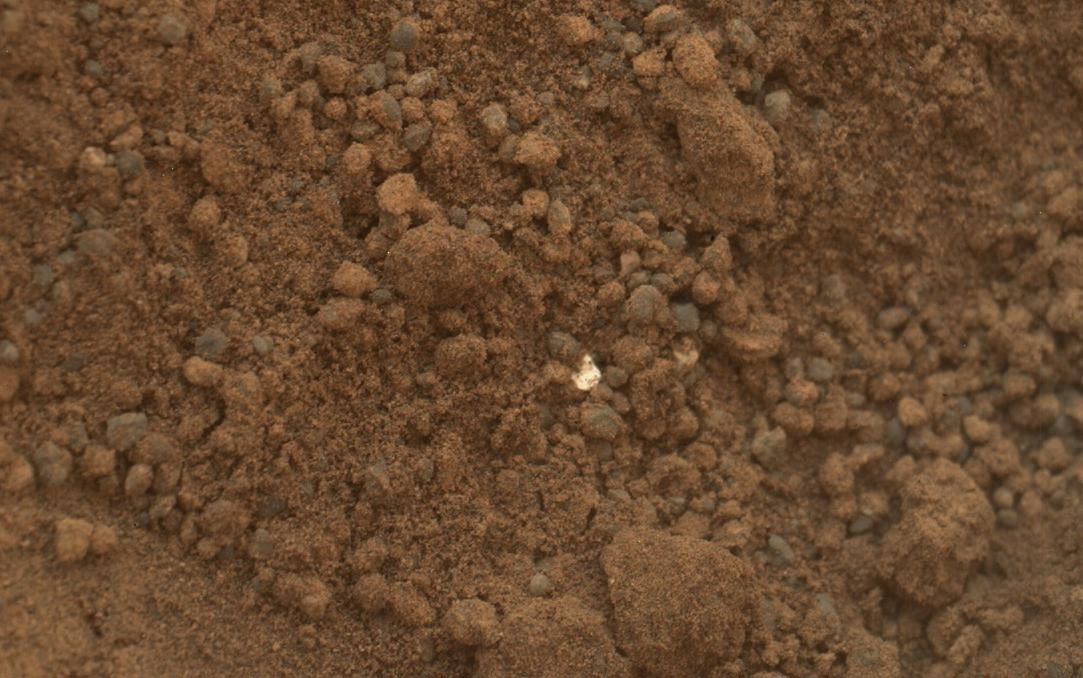
BP Close-up 1

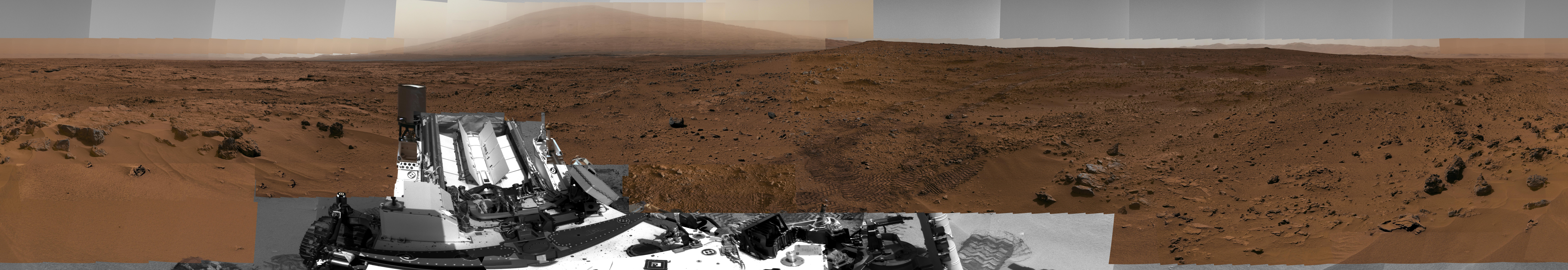
Curiosity's view of the Rocknest area – South is center/North at both ends; Mount Sharp at SE horizon (somewhat left-of-center); Glenelg at East (left-of-center); rover tracks at West (right-of-center) (November 16, 2012, white balanced) (raw color) (interactives).
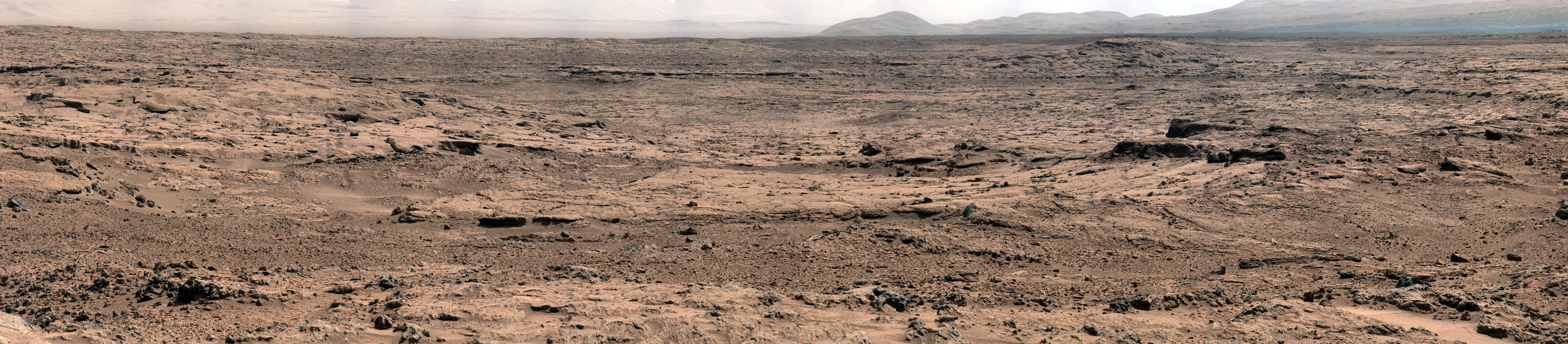
Curiosity's view from Rocknest looking eastward toward Point Lake (center) on the way to Glenelg Intrigue (November 26, 2012, white balanced) (raw color).

== See also ==
- Aeolis quadrangle
- Bedrock
- Composition of Mars
- Geology of Mars
- List of rocks on Mars
- Martian soil
- Rock outcrop
- Timeline of Mars Science Laboratory
- Water on Mars
