= Mars Hand Lens Imager =

Camera on the Curiosity rover

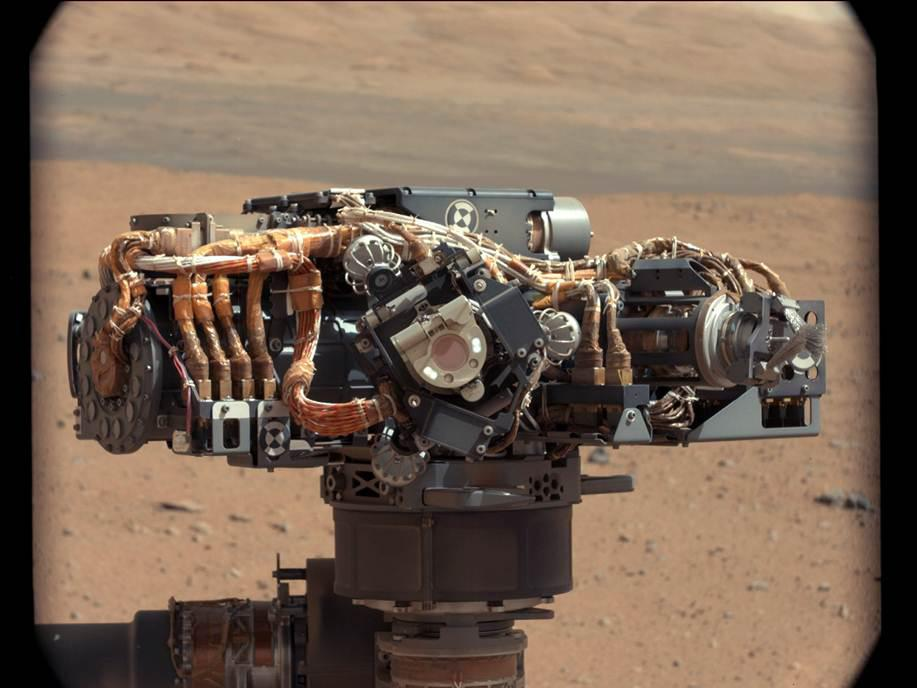
Curiosity's Mars Hand Lens Imager (MAHLI) on Mars - Mount Sharp is in the background (September 8, 2012).

Mars Hand Lens Imager (MAHLI) is one of seventeen cameras on the Curiosity rover on the Mars Science Laboratory mission.

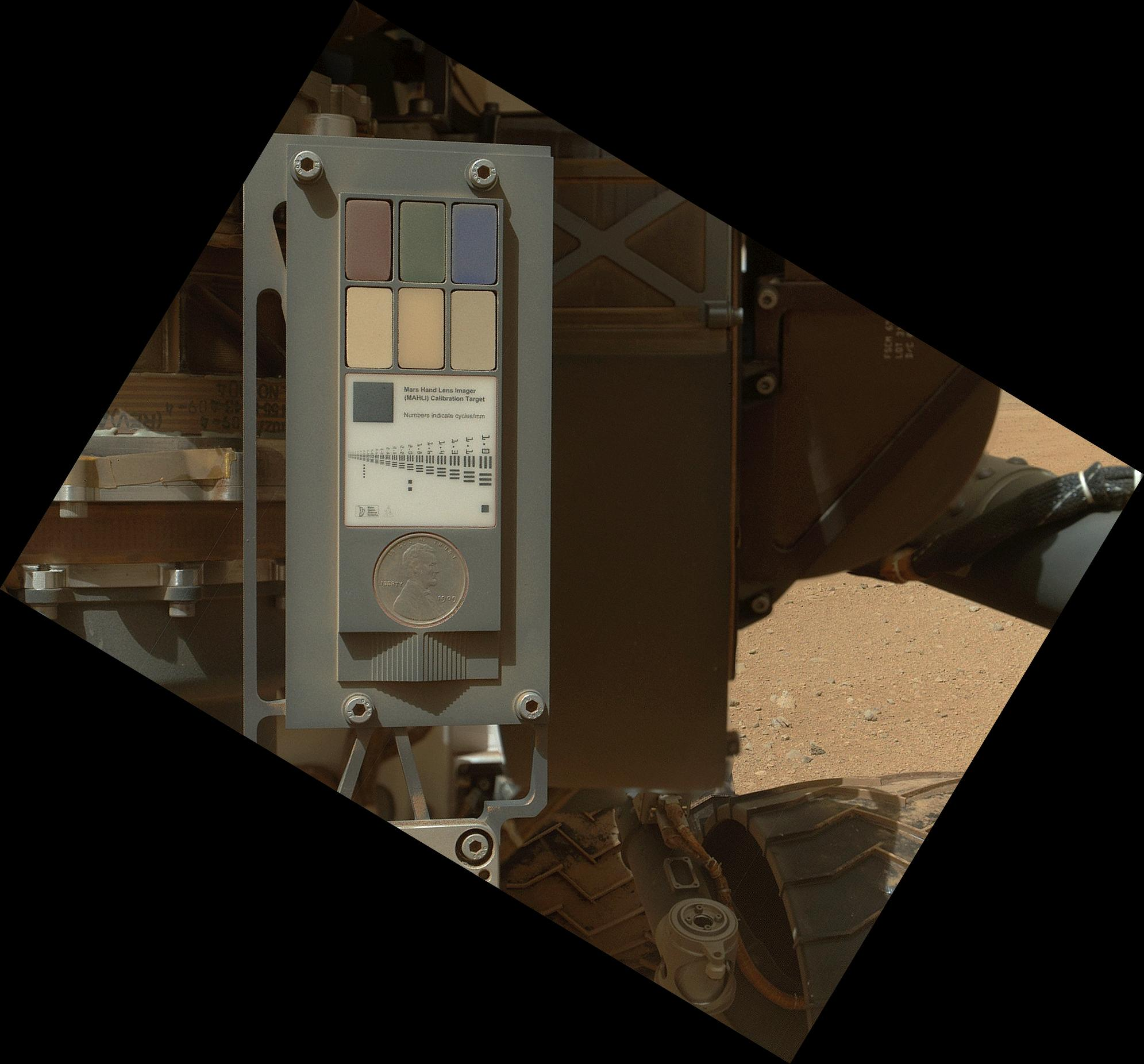
Calibration Target of the Mars Hand Lens Imager (September 9, 2012) (3D image)

== Overview ==
The instrument is mounted on the rover's robotic arm. It is primarily used to acquire microscopic images of rock and soil, but it can also be used for other images. MAHLI can take true-color images at 1600×1200 pixels with a resolution as high as 14.5 micrometers per pixel. MAHLI has an 18.3 mm to 21.3 mm focal length and a 33.8- to 38.5-degree field of view. MAHLI has both white and ultraviolet LED illumination for imaging in darkness or fluorescence imaging. MAHLI also has mechanical focusing in a range from infinite to millimetre distances. This system can make some images with focus stacking processing. MAHLI can store either the raw images or do real-time lossless predictive or JPEG compression. The calibration target (3D image) for MAHLI includes color references, a metric bar graphic, a 1909 VDB Lincoln penny, and a stairstep pattern for depth calibration.

NASA says, "The main purpose of Curiosity's MAHLI camera is to acquire close-up, high-resolution views of rocks and soil at the rover's Gale Crater field site. The camera is capable of focusing on any target at distances of about 0.8 inch (2.1 centimeters) to infinity. This means it can, as shown here, also obtain pictures of the Martian landscape."

The device is also used to take photos of the rover. One of those photos was considered in 2013 by Discovery News as one of the best space robot selfies.
