= Goulburn (Mars) =

Outcrop on Mars

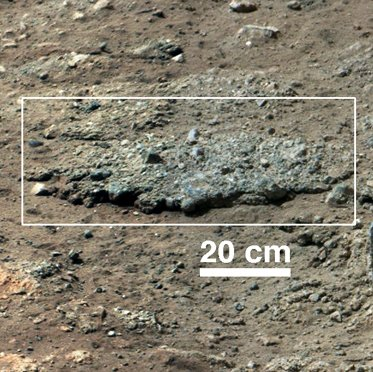
- Goulburn rock outcrop on Mars - an ancient streambed - viewed by the Curiosity rover (August 17, 2012).
- Feature type: Rock outcrop
- Coordinates: 4.59°S 137.44°E

Goulburn, also known as Goulburn Scour, is a rock outcrop on the surface of Aeolis Palus, between Peace Vallis and Aeolis Mons ("Mount Sharp"), in Gale crater on the planet Mars. The outcrop was encountered by the Curiosity rover on landing at the Bradbury Landing on August 6, 2012 (the 1st sol of the mission) and is named after a two-billion year-old sequence of rocks in Northern Canada. The "approximate" site coordinates are: 4.59°S 137.44°E.

The outcrop is a well-sorted gravel conglomerate, containing well-rounded, smooth, abraded pebbles. Occasional pebbles up to a few centimeters across are embedded in amongst a matrix of finer rounded particles, up to a centimeter across. It has been interpreted as a fluvial sediment, deposited by a vigorously flowing stream, probably between ankle and waist deep. This stream is part of an ancient alluvial fan, which descends from the steep terrain at the rim of Gale crater across its floor.

== Gallery ==
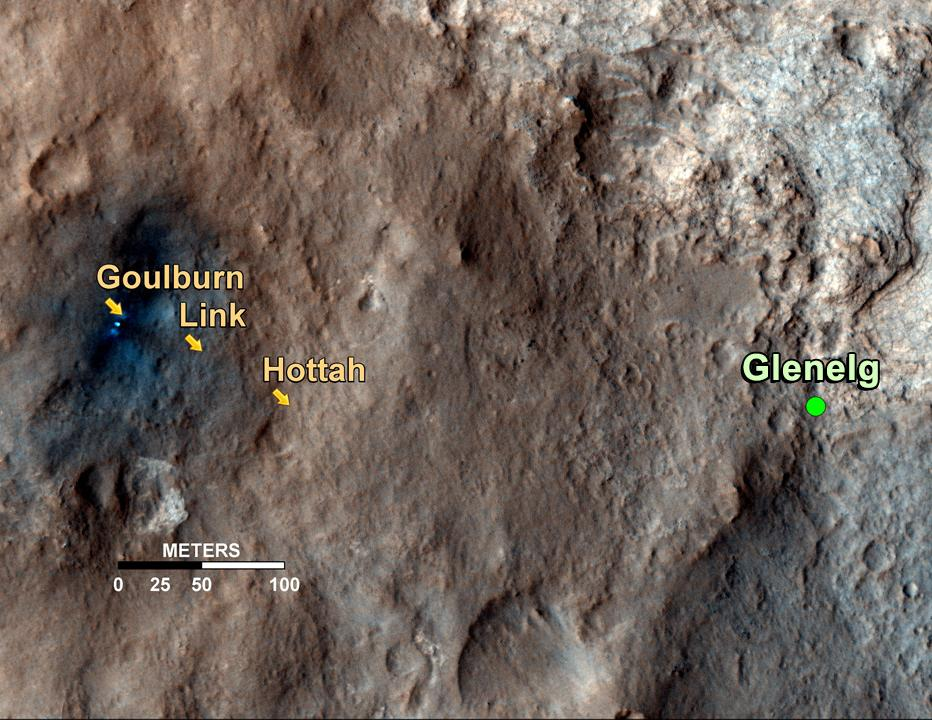
Goulburn, Link and Hottah rock outcrops - suggest "vigorously" flowing water in an ancient streambed (September 27, 2012).

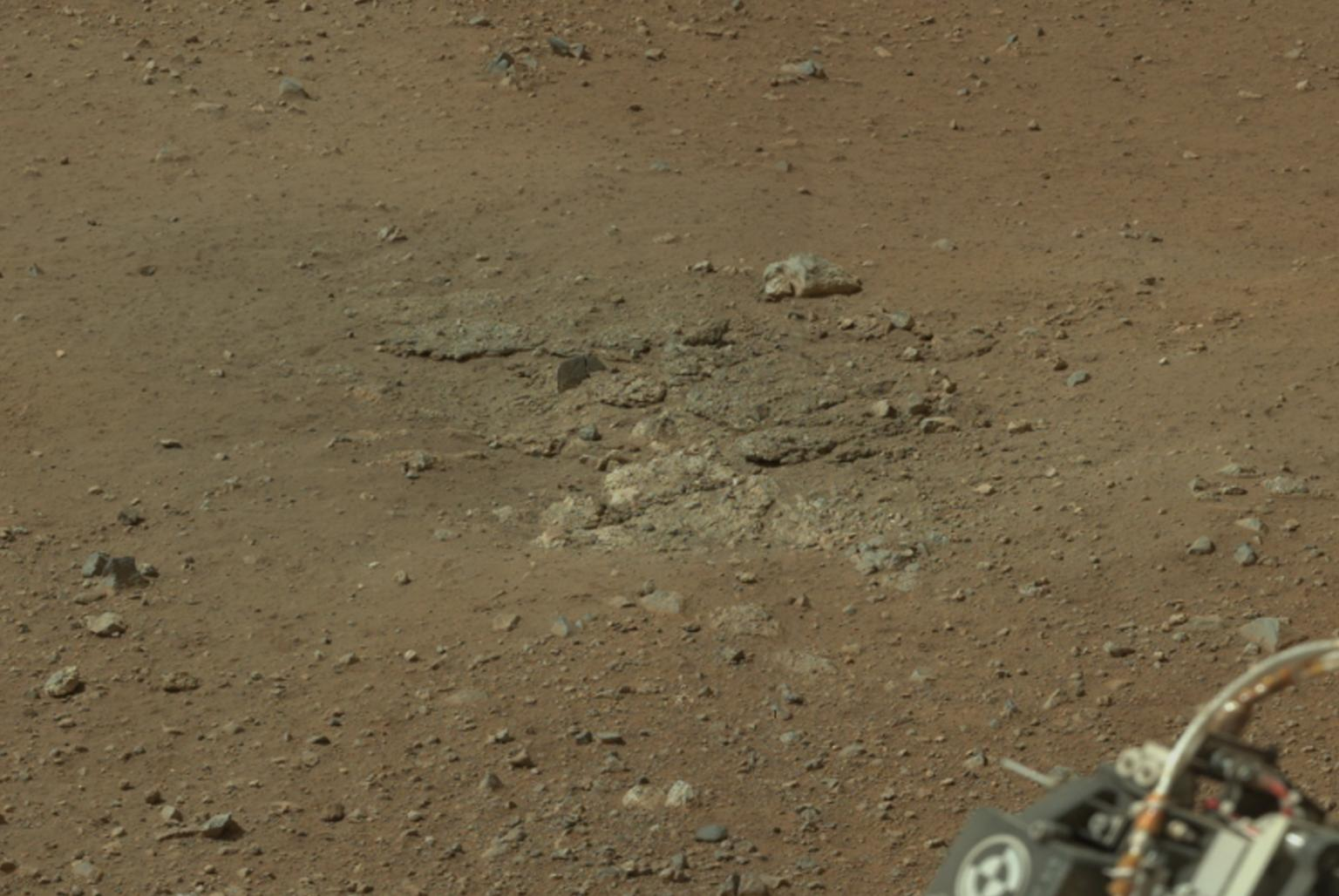
Goulburn rock outcrop on Mars - near the landing site (Bradbury Landing) of the Curiosity rover (August 17, 2012).

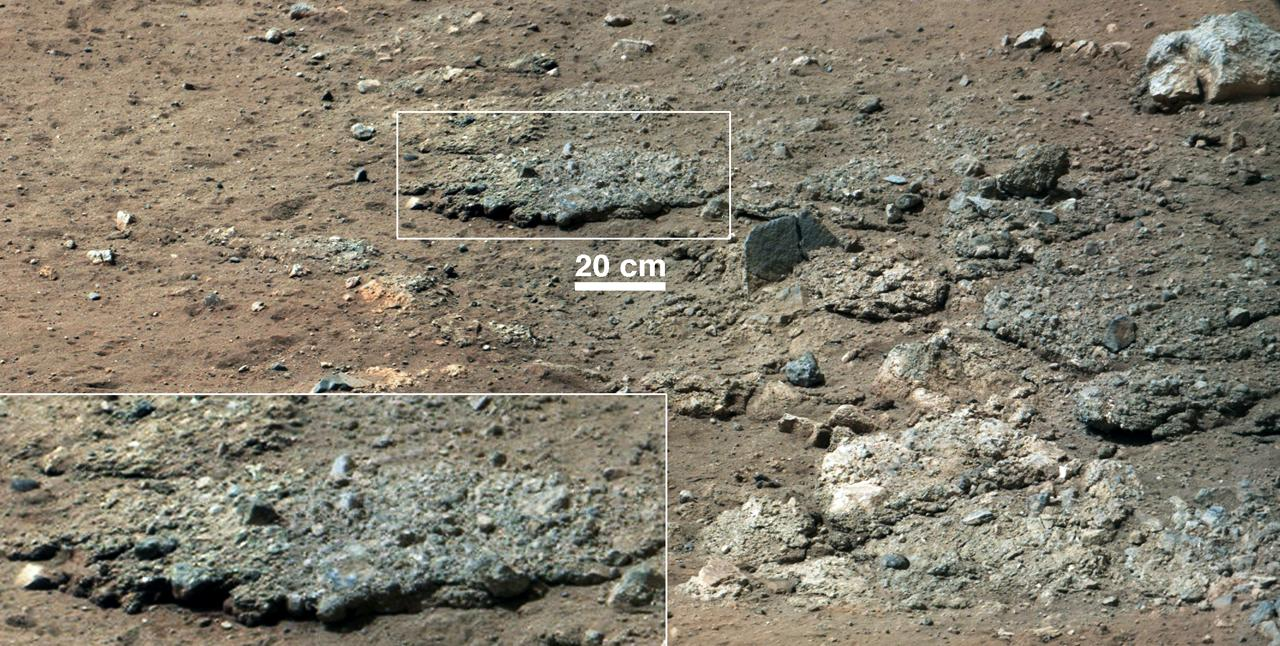
Goulburn rock outcrop on Mars - an ancient streambed - viewed by the Curiosity rover (August 17, 2012).

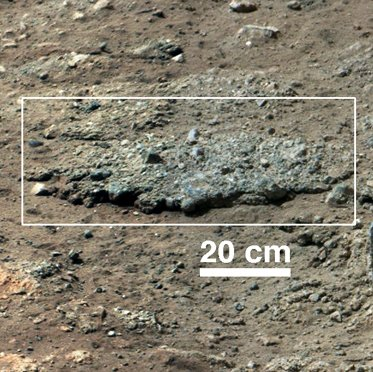
Goulburn rock outcrop on Mars - Close-up (August 17, 2012).

== See also ==
- Aeolis quadrangle
- Bedrock
- Composition of Mars
- Geology of Mars
- Hottah (Mars)
- Link (Mars)
- List of rocks on Mars
- Rock outcrop
- Timeline of Mars Science Laboratory
- Water on Mars
