= Link (Mars) =

Rock outcrop on Mars

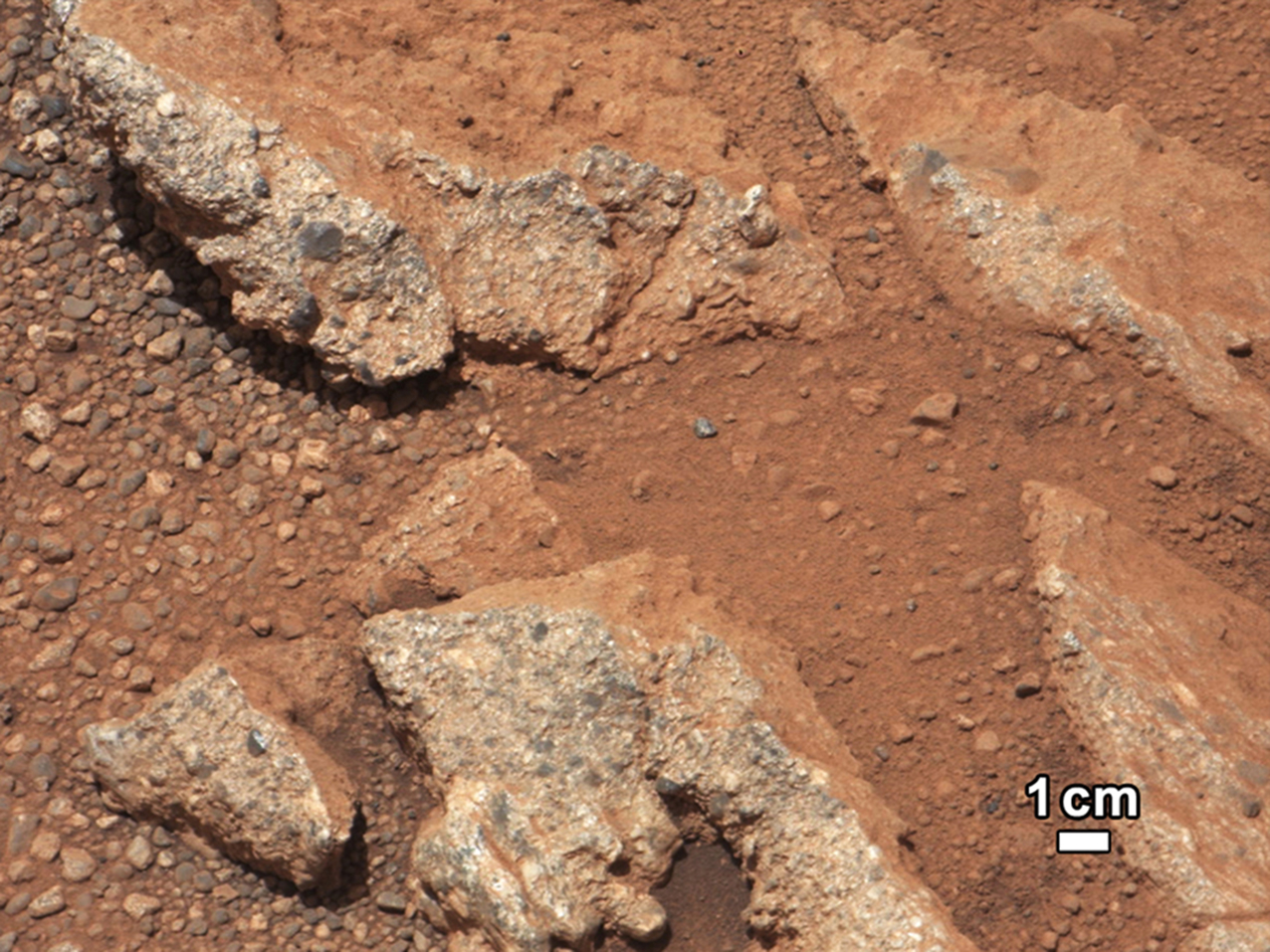
- Link rock outcrop on Mars - an ancient streambed viewed by the Curiosity rover (September 2, 2012) (3-D version).
- Feature type: Rock outcrop
- Coordinates: 4.59°S 137.44°E

Link is a rock outcrop on the surface of Aeolis Palus, between Peace Vallis and Aeolis Mons ("Mount Sharp"), in Gale crater on the planet Mars. The outcrop was encountered by the Curiosity rover on the way from Bradbury Landing to Glenelg Intrigue on September 2, 2012 (the 27th sol of the mission), and was named after a significant rock formation (and lake) in the Northwest Territories of Canada. The approximate site coordinates are 4.59°S 137.44°E.

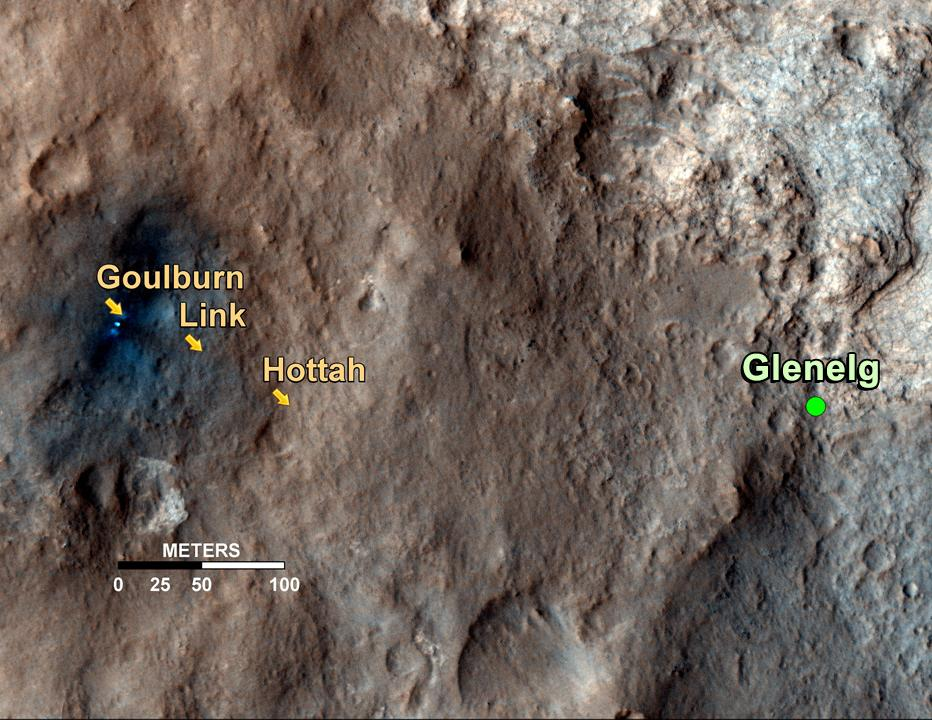
Goulburn, Link and Hottah rock outcrop - suggest "vigorously" flowing water in an ancient streambed (September 27, 2012).

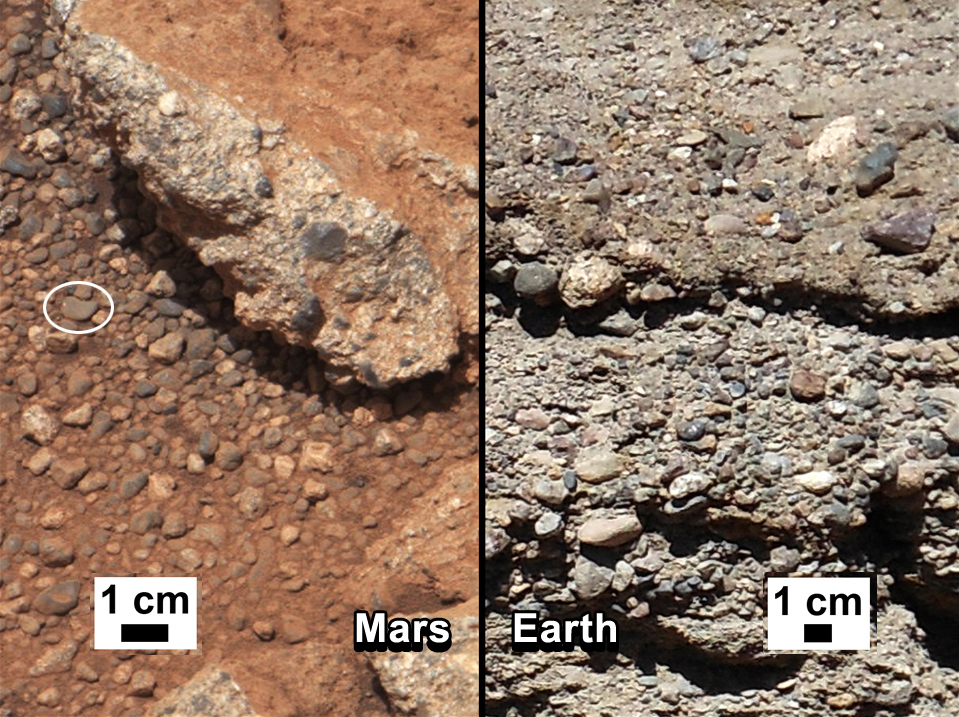
The sedimentology of Link (left) is strikingly similar to a terrestrial fluvial conglomerate (right).

The outcrop is a conglomerate of gravel that has been well-sorted, containing well-rounded, smooth, abraded pebbles. Pebbles and gravel a few millimeters to centimeters across are embedded in amongst a finer, white matrix. This outcrop geology is strikingly similar to some terrestrial fluvial conglomerates. Around the rock are scattered well sorted loose gravel around 1 cm across, which are thought to be weathering out of the outcrop.

The rock has been interpreted as a cemented fluvial sediment, deposited by a vigorously flowing stream, probably between ankle and waist deep. This stream is part of an ancient alluvial fan, which descends from the steep terrain at the rim of Gale crater across its floor.

== See also ==
- Aeolis quadrangle
- Bedrock
- Composition of Mars
- Geology of Mars
- Goulburn (Mars)
- Hottah (Mars)
- List of rocks on Mars
- Rock outcrop
- Timeline of Mars Science Laboratory
- Water on Mars
