= Hottah (Mars) =

Rock outcrop on the surface of Aeolis Palus

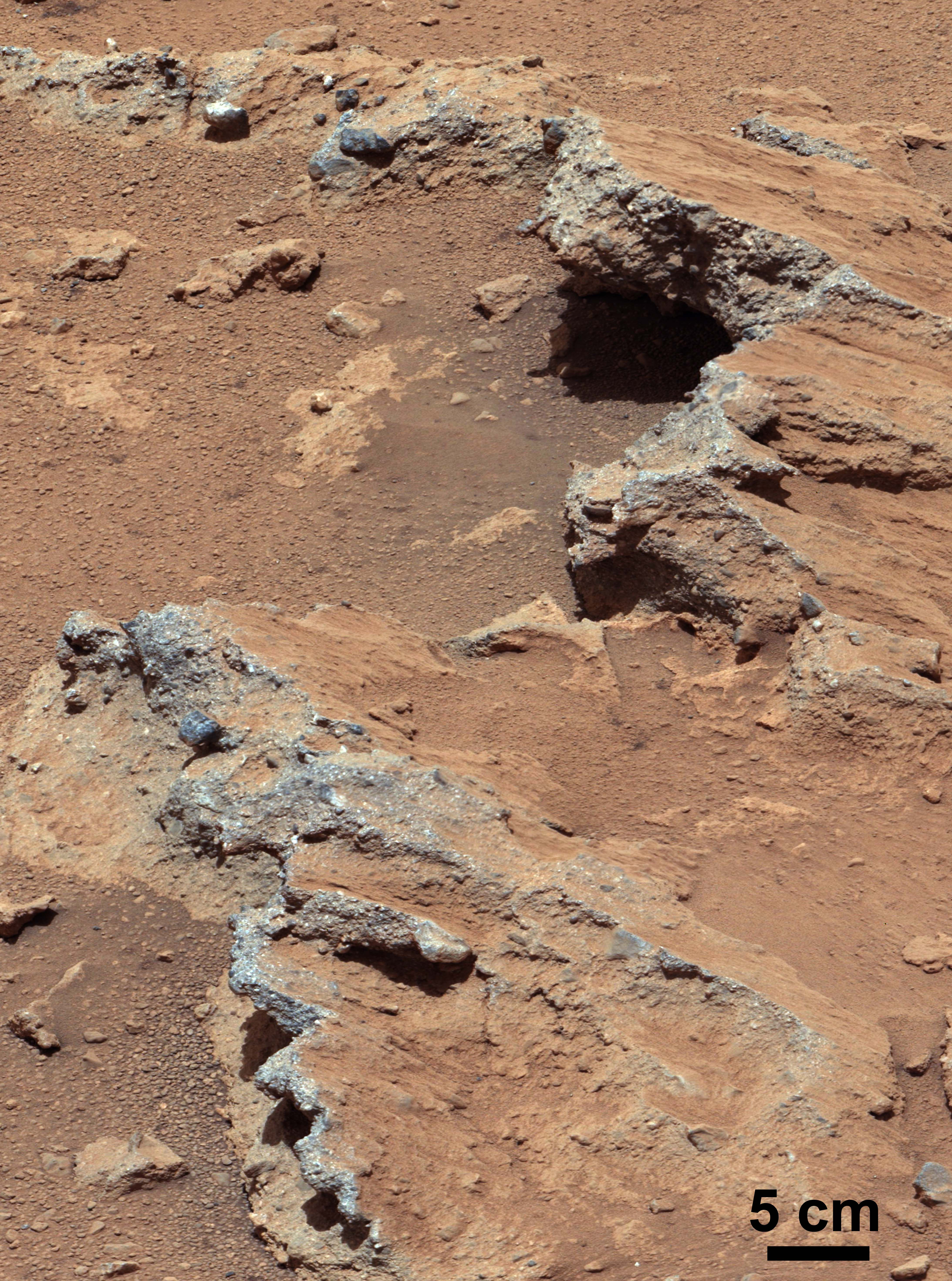
- Hottah rock outcrop on Mars - an ancient streambed viewed by the Curiosity rover (September 12, 2012, white balanced) (close-up) (3-D version).
- Feature type: Rock outcrop
- Coordinates: 4.59°S 137.44°E

Hottah is a rock outcrop on the surface of Aeolis Palus, between Peace Vallis and Aeolis Mons ("Mount Sharp"), in Gale crater on the planet Mars.

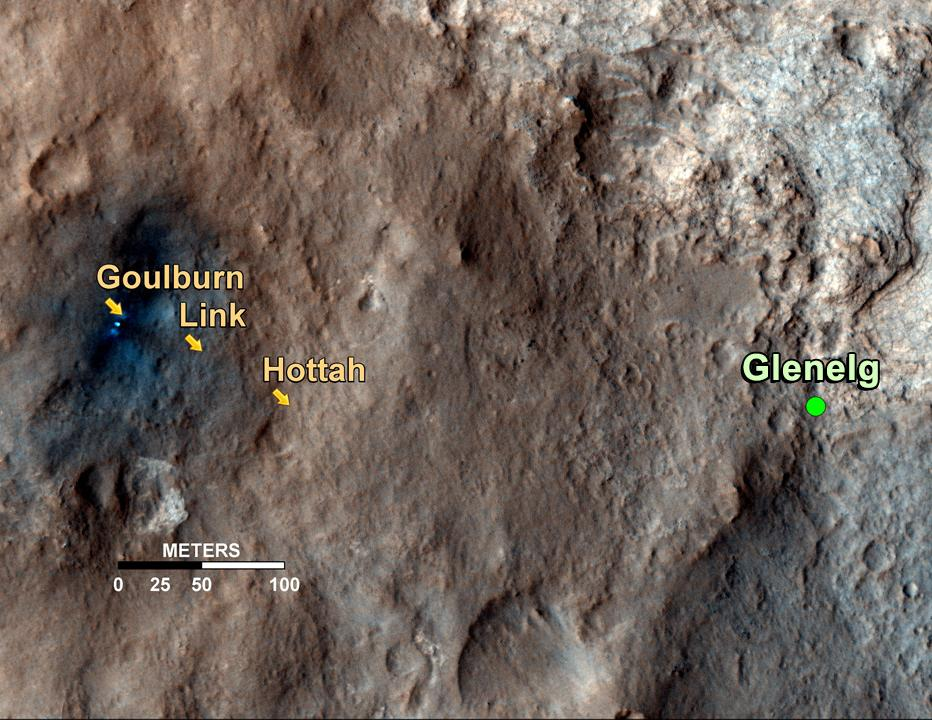
Goulburn, Link and Hottah rock outcrop - suggest "vigorously" flowing water in an ancient streambed (September 27, 2012).

The outcrop was encountered by the Curiosity rover on the way from Bradbury Landing to Glenelg Intrigue on September 14, 2012 (the 39th sol of the mission), and was named after Hottah Lake, the sixth largest lake in the Northwest Territories, Canada. The "approximate" site coordinates are: 4.59°S 137.44°E.

The outcrop is a well-sorted gravel conglomerate, containing well-rounded, smooth, abraded pebbles. Occasional pebbles up to a few centimeters across are embedded in amongst a matrix of finer rounded particles, up to a centimeter across. It has been interpreted as a fluvial sediment, deposited by a vigorously flowing stream, probably between ankle and waist deep. This stream is part of an ancient alluvial fan, which descends from the steep terrain at the rim of Gale crater across its floor.

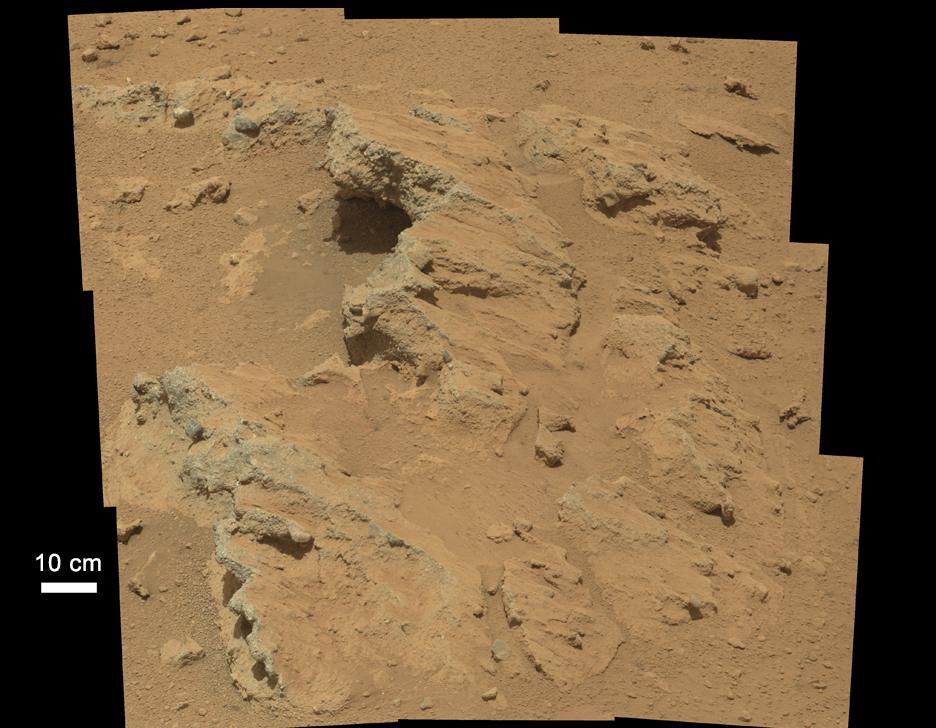
Remnant of ancient streambed on Mars (white-balanced) (September 14, 2012). (close-up) (3-D version).

== See also ==
- Aeolis quadrangle
- Bedrock
- Composition of Mars
- Geology of Mars
- Goulburn (Mars)
- Link (Mars)
- List of rocks on Mars
- Rock outcrop
- Timeline of Mars Science Laboratory
- Water on Mars
