= Peace Vallis =

Martian valley

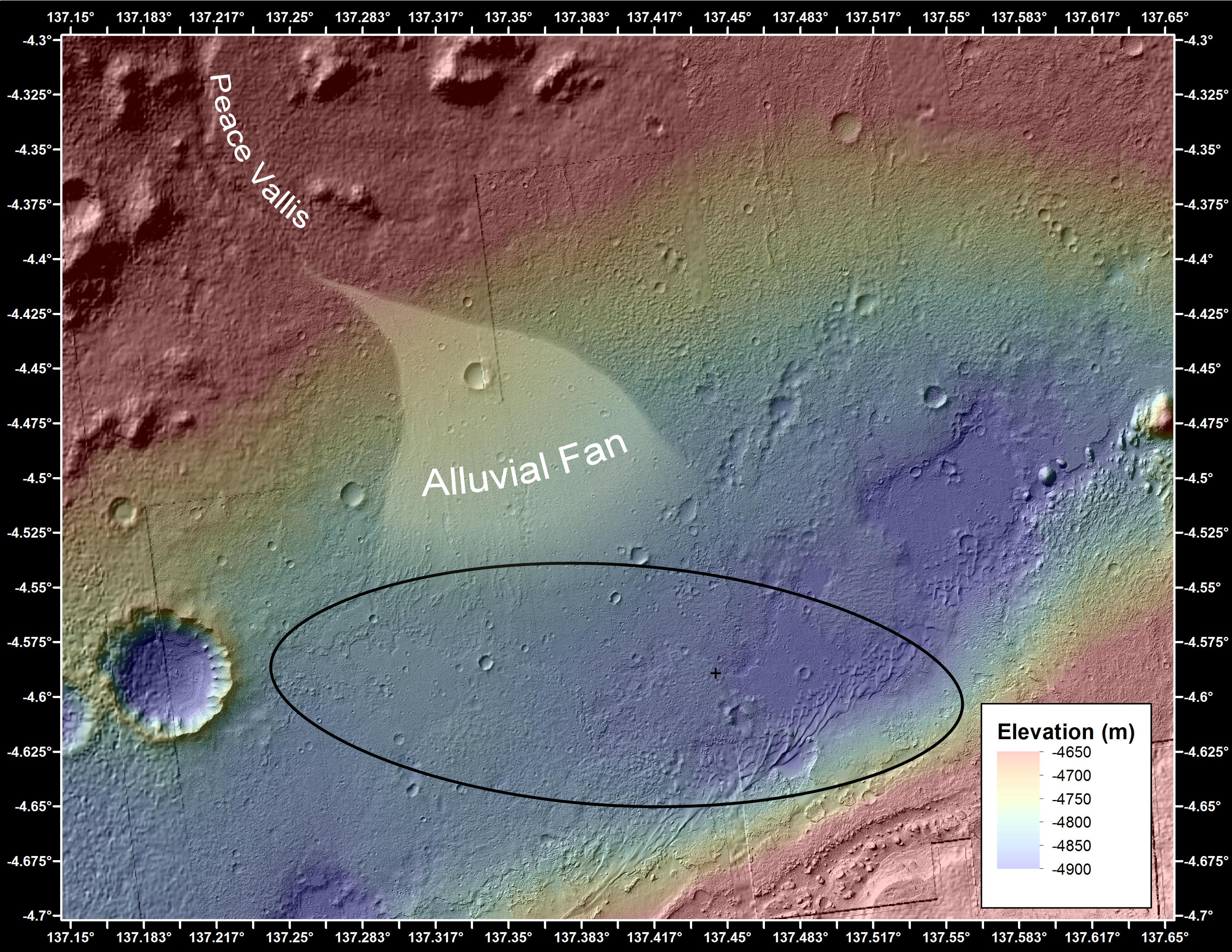
- Peace Vallis and related alluvial fan near the Curiosity rover landing ellipse and landing site (Bradbury Landing) (noted by cross [+]).
- Coordinates: 4.21°S 137.23°E
- Length: 35.24 km (21.90 mi)
- Naming: Adopted by the IAU on September 26, 2012, after the Peace River in British Columbia and Alberta, Canada.

Peace Vallis is an ancient stream valley on the northern rim of Gale Crater on the planet Mars. It is notable for its associated alluvial fan which lies near the Mars Science Laboratory Curiosity landing site (Bradbury Landing). The valley and alluvial fan provide evidence for geologically recent (Amazonian-aged) fluvial activity and sustained water flow on Mars. Recent high-resolution orbital images of Peace Vallis and its watershed also suggest that at least one glacial episode affected Gale crater. All of this evidence has implications for the history of water on Mars and the planet's long-term habitability. Understanding Peace Vallis and its fan also provides geologic context for the rocks observed on the ground by the Curiosity rover.

== Location and Regional Context ==
The valley is centered at 4.21°S 137.23°E in the northeastern Aeolis quadrangle of Mars and drains approximately 1,500 square kilometers (580 sq mi) of the northern rim of Gale Crater. While the stream was active, surface water and groundwater drained to the south into a low-lying plain in the northern interior of the crater (Aeolis Palus) where the stream valley debouched into a large alluvial fan (Peace Vallis fan).

Gale Crater itself is a 154-kilometer (96 mi)-diameter impact crater that straddles the martian hemispheric dichotomy between the heavily cratered southern highlands and the lower elevation plains (Elysium Planitia) to the north. Gale Crater is noteworthy for its enigmatic 5-kilometer (3.1 mi)-high crescent-shaped central mound, Aeolis Mons (known informally as Mt. Sharp). The crater is late Noachian or Early Hesperian in age (approximately 3.65 to 3.55 billion years old).

The northern rim of Gale Crater is heavily eroded and hosts a number of geomorphic features indicating the effects of flowing water. These include valleys, gullies, and canyons; sinuous ridges interpreted to be inverted channels; and alluvial fan-like mesas. Peace Vallis and its alluvial fan is the largest and best studied of these fluvial features in northern Gale Crater.

== Name ==
Peace Vallis is named after the Peace River in Alberta and British Columbia, Canada. The name was adopted by the International Astronomical Union (IAU) on September 26, 2012. Vallis is the Latin word for valley.

== Valley and Drainage Basin ==
Peace Vallis is a valley network characterized by a branching (dendritic) pattern of tributary valleys that resembles river drainage basins on Earth. They are common on the older heavily cratered regions of Mars. Most planetary scientists agree that valley networks were formed by flowing water, but the source of the water is still debated. Some argue that rainfall on a warm and wet early mars produced them. Others have suggested they were produced by mass wasting, spring sapping, or from snowmelt on an ancient Mars whose climate was dry and cold much like today's.

The Peace Vallis drainage basin (or catchment) covers an area of about 1,500 km^{2} (579 mi^{2}). This area sits 1,300 m (4,265 ft) above the crater floor and consists of gently sloping plains interspersed with hills roughly 100 to 350 m (328 to 1,148 ft) high. These irregular hills are mostly mantled with debris that appear to be some combination of aeolian deposits and colluvium. Erosion of the watershed surface has produced a mottled scoured appearance, suggesting mobilization and transport of sediments into topographic lows.

Compared with most terrestrial valleys carved by rainfall, the drainage density (stream length per unit area) of Peace Vallis and its tributaries is very low. There is a lack of highly integrated fluvial channels, and the areas between the tributary valleys (interfluves) are undissected by smaller valleys or gullies. The drainage density of the Peace Vallis system has been estimated to be 0.15 km^{–1}. In contrast, drainage densities of rivers on Earth range from 2 to 30 km^{–1}. Factors that control drainage density include slope, rock type (which determines infiltration capacity) and climate (mainly precipitation). The low drainage density of Peace Vallis suggests an environment of relatively gentle slopes, very low (or infrequent) precipitation, permeable soils or bedrock, or some combination of the three.

The valleys are U-shaped in topographic profile, with widths ranging from 80 to 900 meters (262 to 2,950 feet) and a mean of 300 meters (984 feet). The main or trunk valley is about 32 km (20 miles) long.

Evidence of water on Mars near Peace Vallis

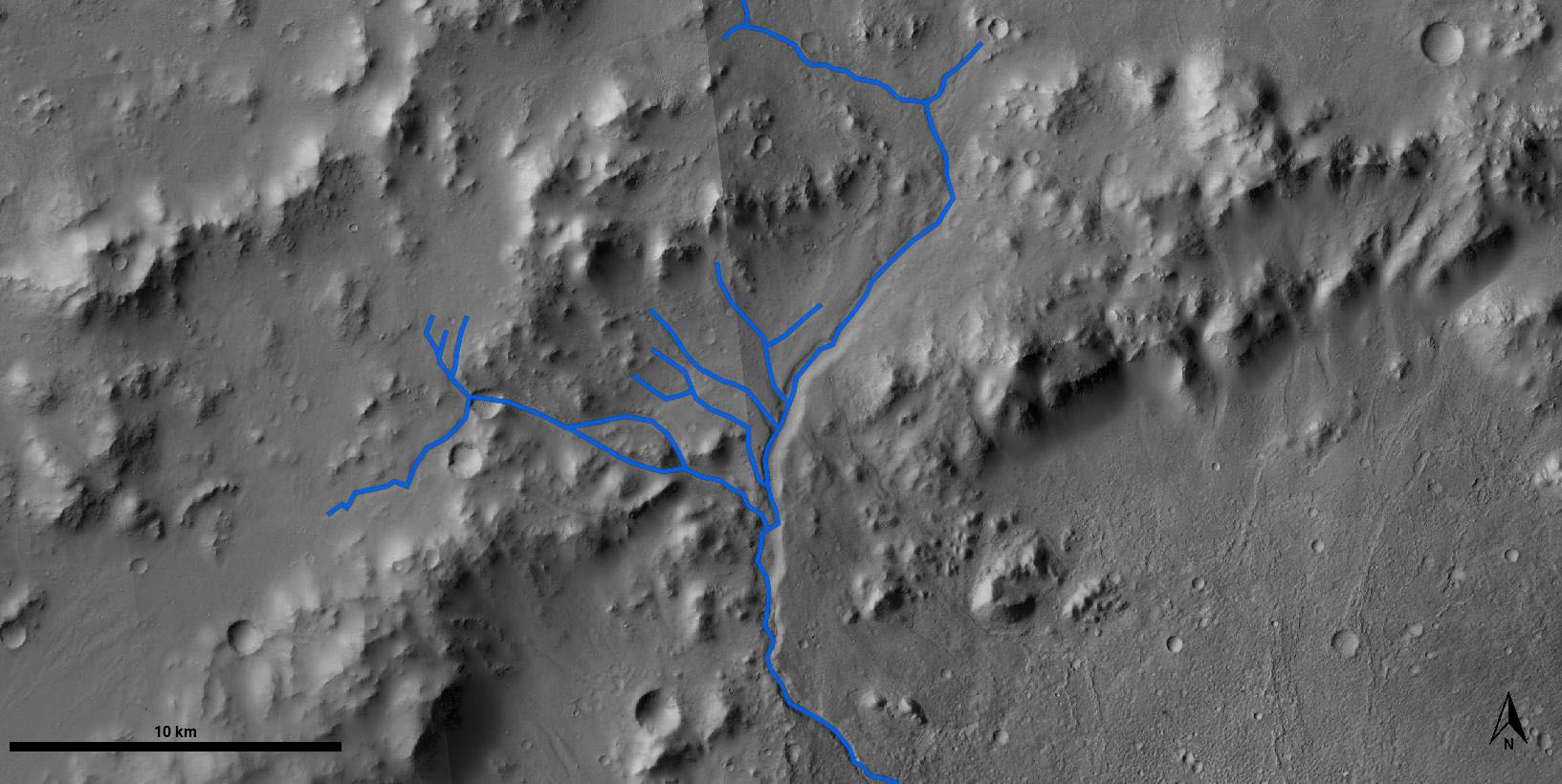
Main valley and tributaries of Peace Vallis (shown in blue).

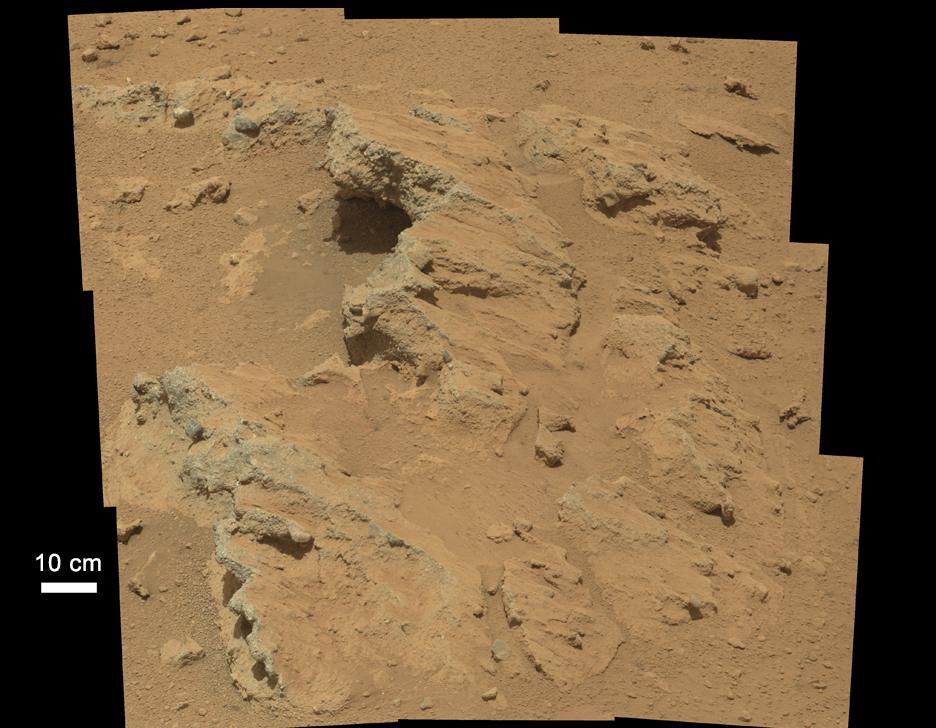
"Hottah" rock outcrop on Mars - an ancient streambed viewed by the Curiosity rover (September 14, 2012) (close-up) (3-D version)

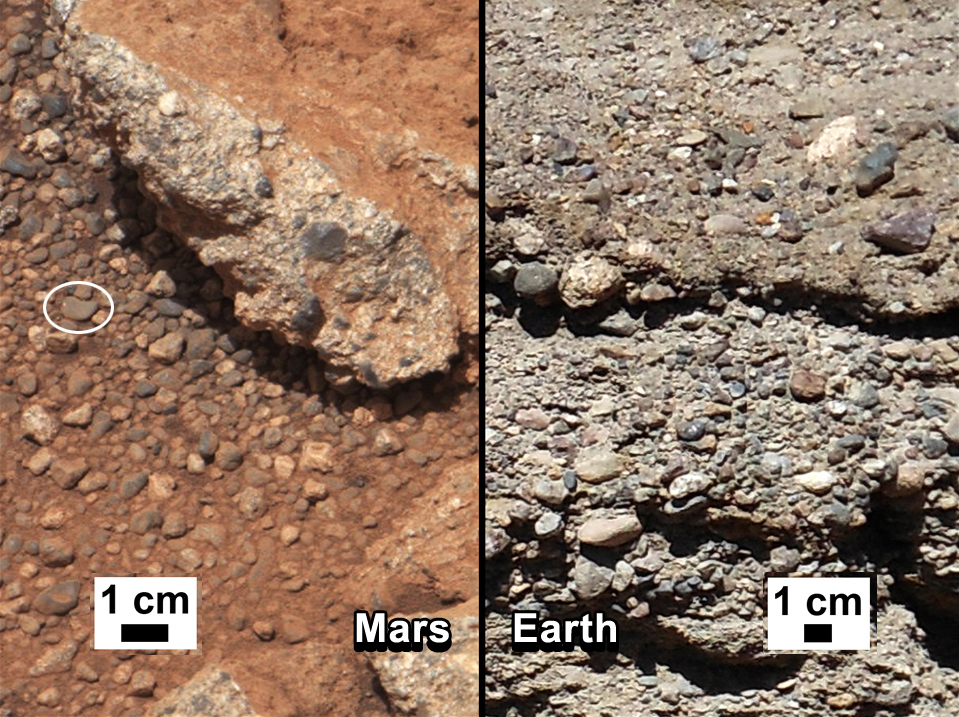
"Link" rock outcrop on Mars - compared with a terrestrial fluvial conglomerate - suggesting water "vigorously" flowing in a stream.

Curiosity rover on the way to Glenelg (September 26, 2012).

Curiosity rover landed near the end of the Peace Vallis fan. Peace Vallis fan covers 80 km^{2} (31 sq mi) and obtained water from an area of 730 km^{2} (280 sq mi). Peace Vallis enters Gale Crater through a 15 km-wide (9.3 mi) gap in its rim. Calculations suggest that the fan has an average thickness of 9 m (30 ft). Numerous inverted channels are visible on the western surface of the fan. Runoff through Peace Vallis that made the fan is estimated to be between 600 and 6,000 m (0.37 and 3.73 mi); therefore a hydrologic cycle probably lasted at least thousands of years. The water that flowed in Peace Vallis is believed to be from precipitation, possibly in the form of snow.

== Images ==
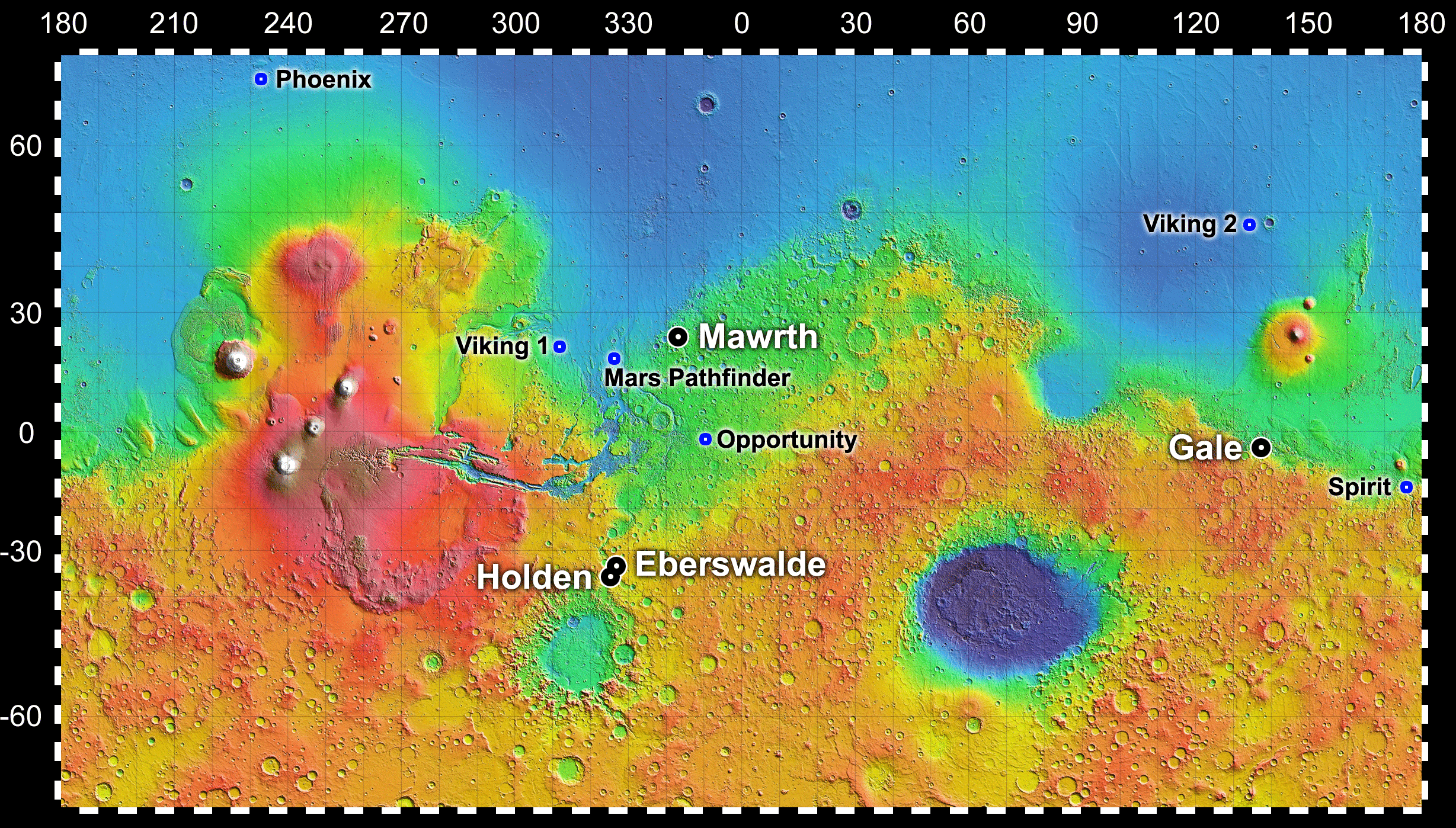
Map of actual (and proposed) Rover landing sites including Gale Crater.

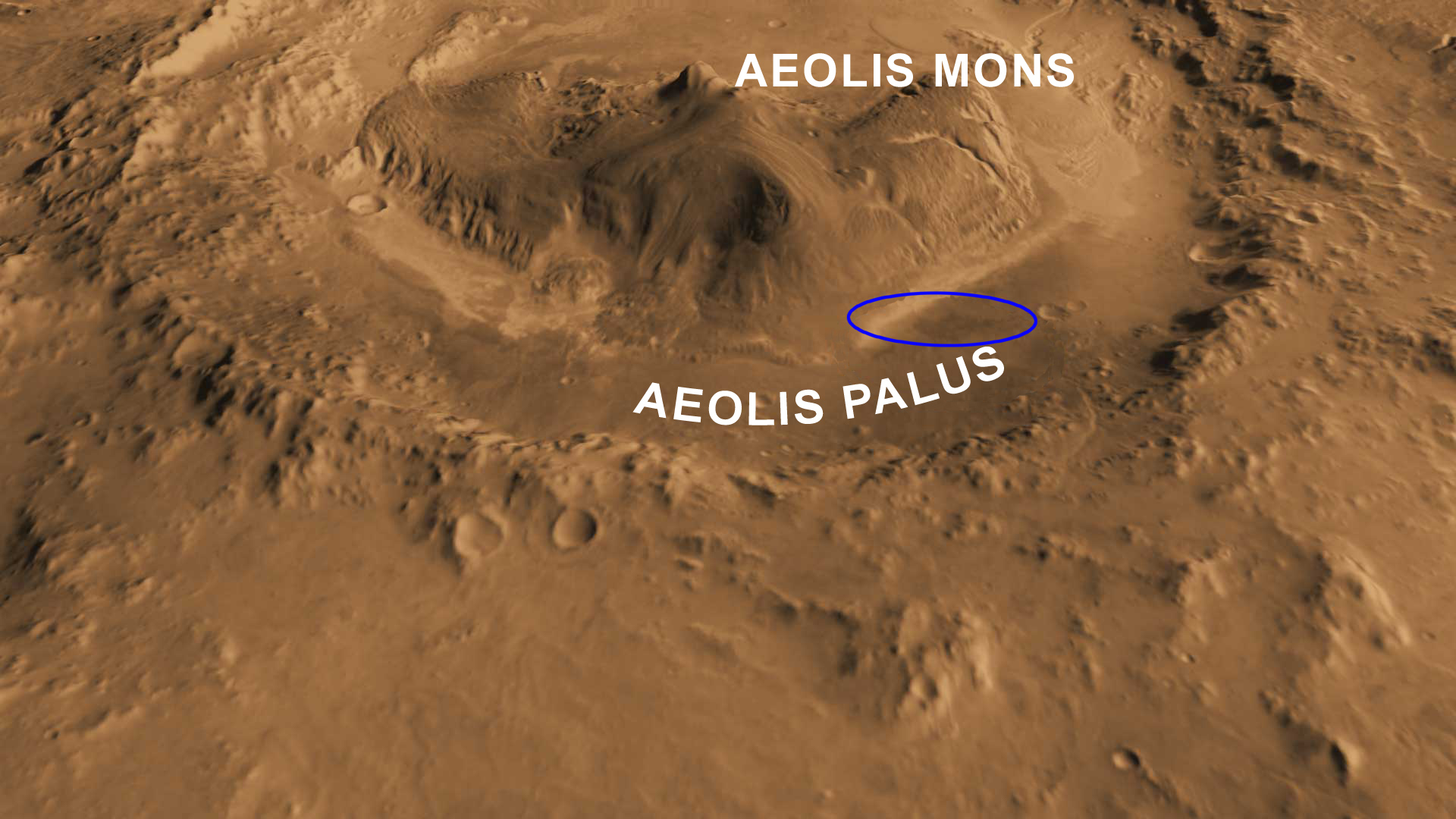
Gale Crater - Landing site is within Aeolis Palus near Aeolis Mons (Mount Sharp) - North is down.

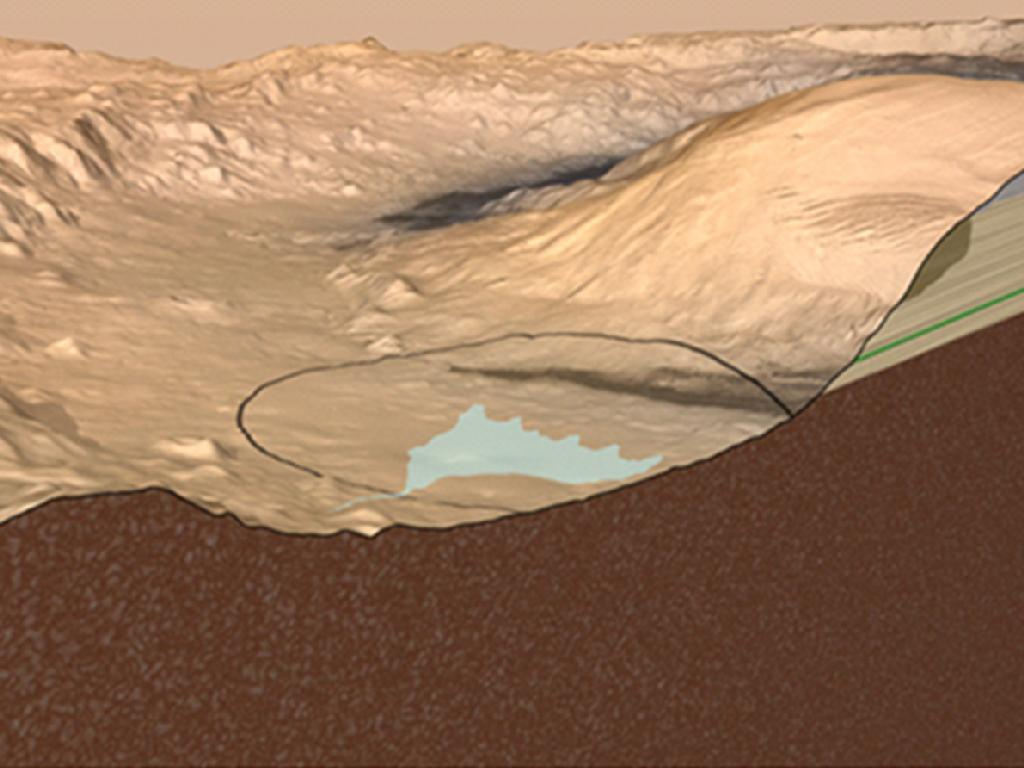
Gale Crater - Landing site is noted - also, alluvial fan (blue) and sediment layers in Aeolis Mons (cutaway).

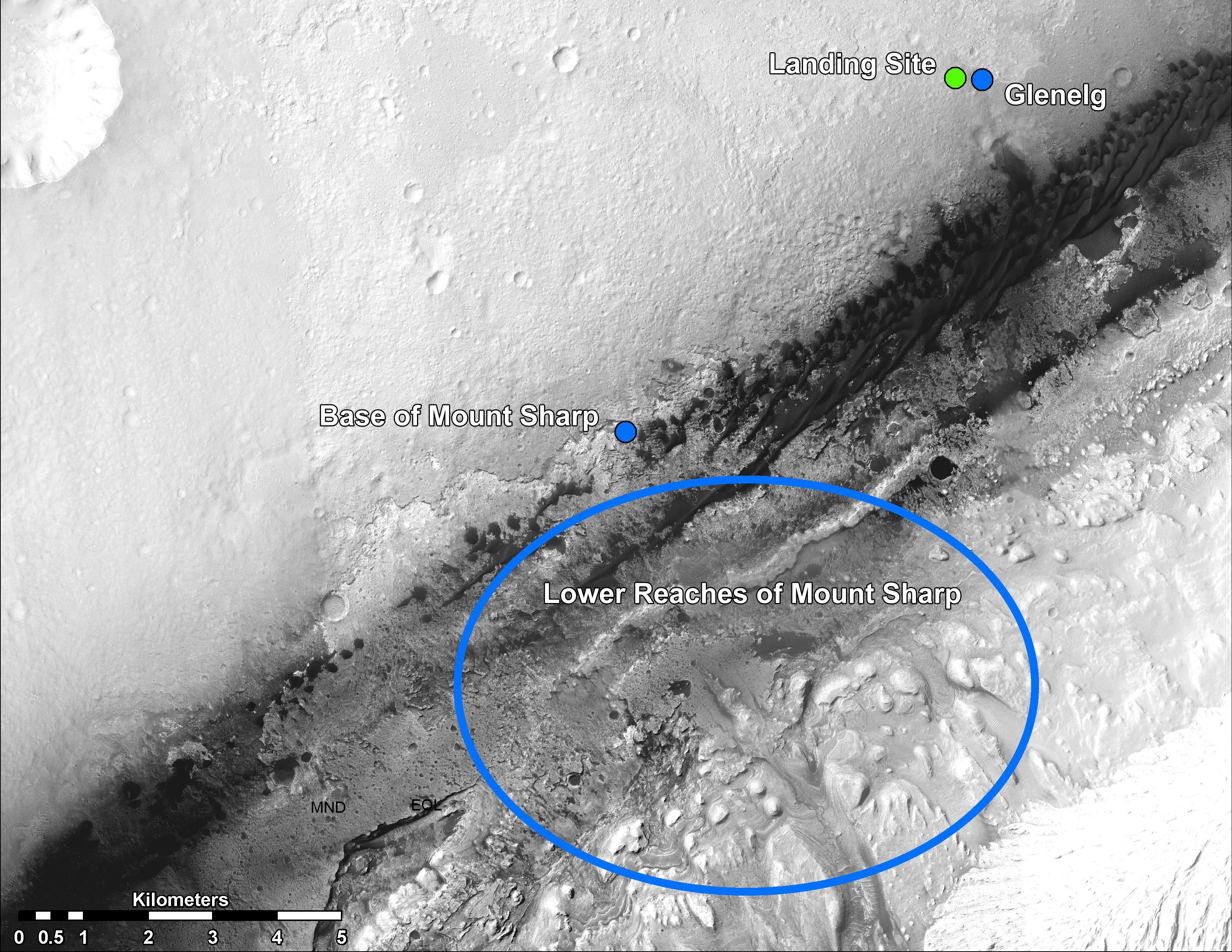
Curiosity rover landing site (green dot) - Blue dot marks Glenelg Intrigue - Blue spot marks the base of Mount Sharp - a planned area of study.

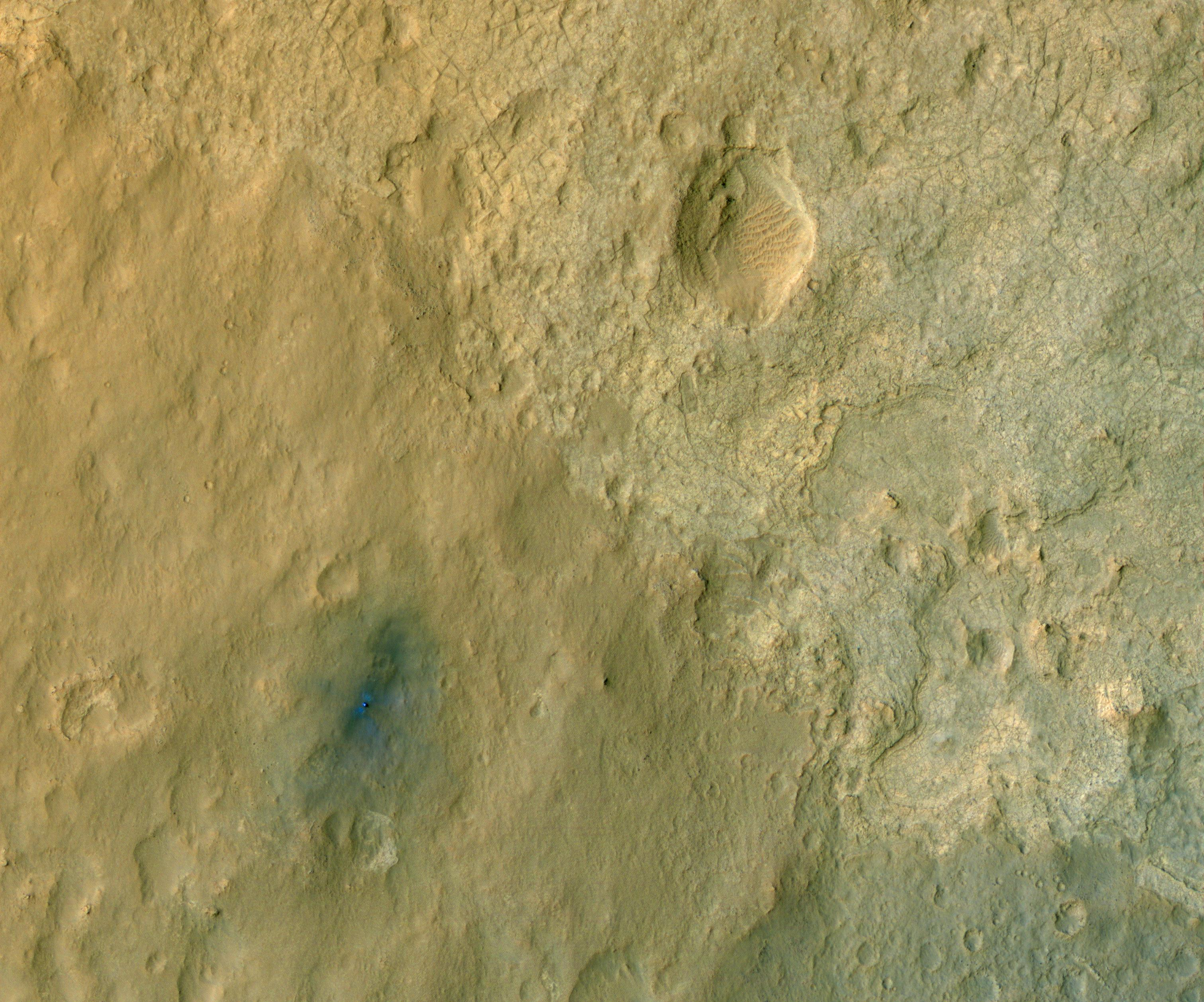
Curiosity rover landing site (Bradbury Landing) viewed by HiRISE (MRO) (August 14, 2012).

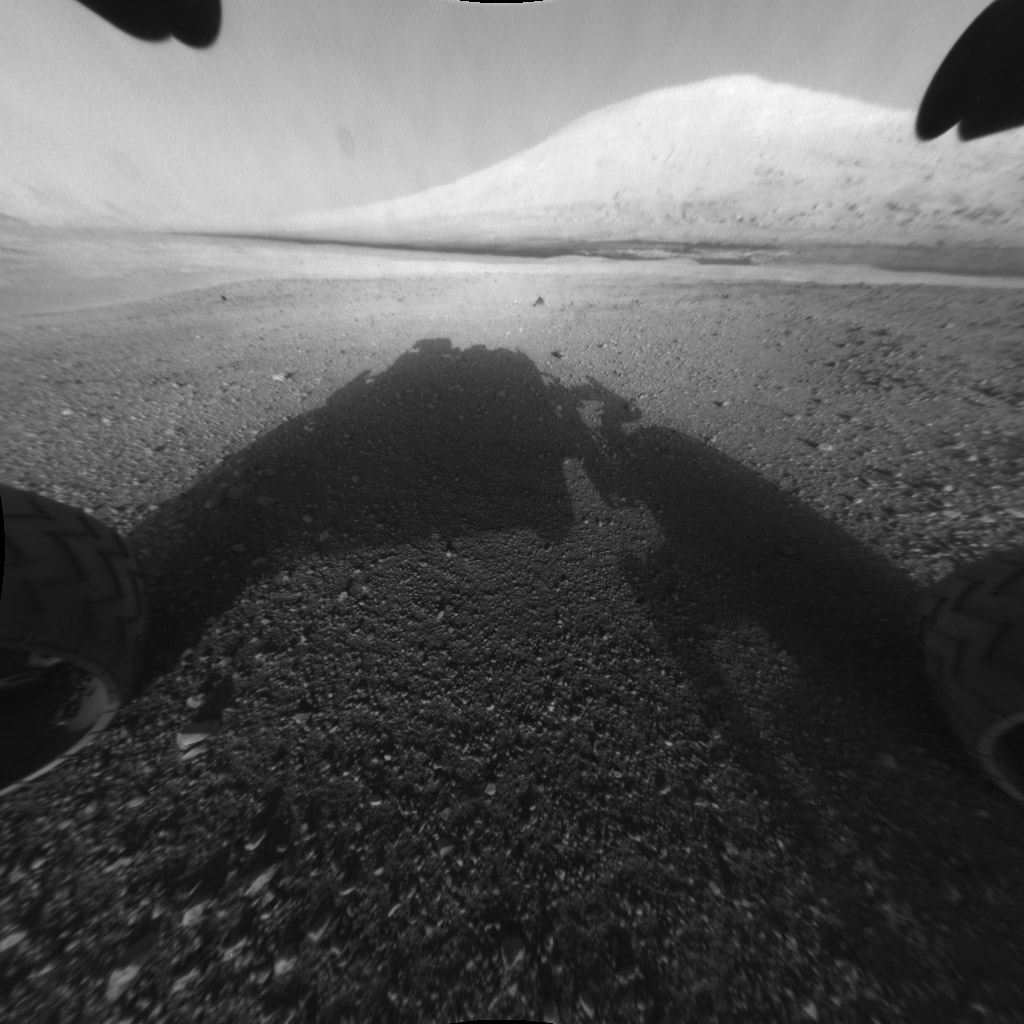
Aeolis Palus and Mount Sharp in Gale Crater as viewed by the Curiosity rover (August 6, 2012).

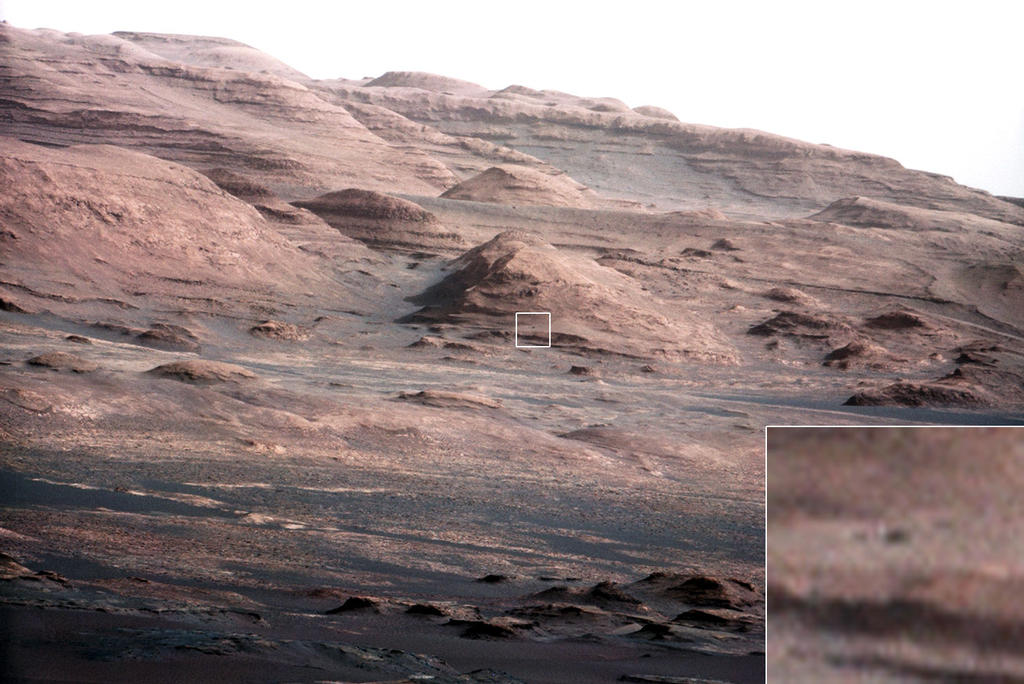
Layers at the base of Aeolis Mons - dark rock in inset is same size as the Curiosity rover (white balanced image).

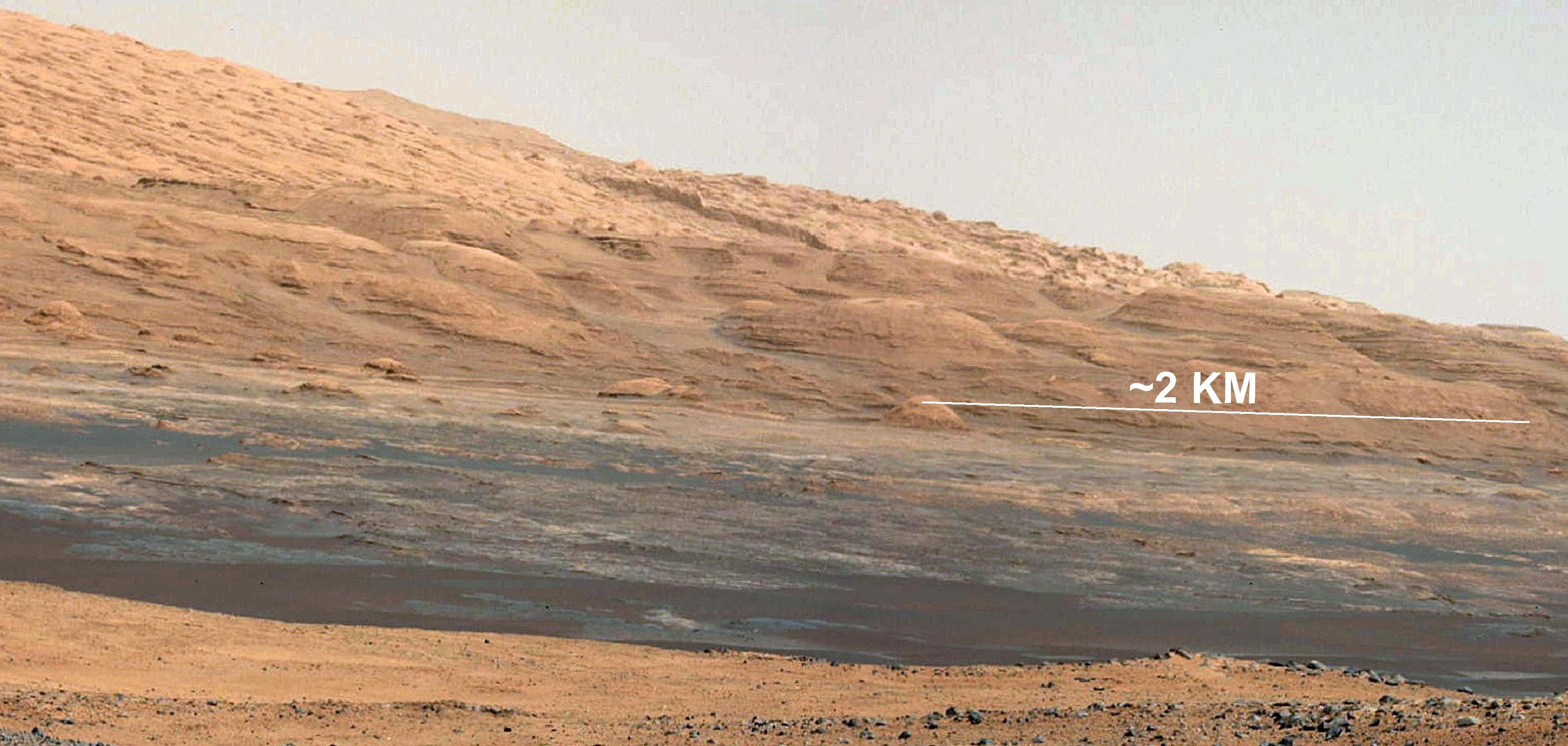
Aeolis Mons in Gale Crater as viewed from the Curiosity rover (August 9, 2012) (white balanced image).

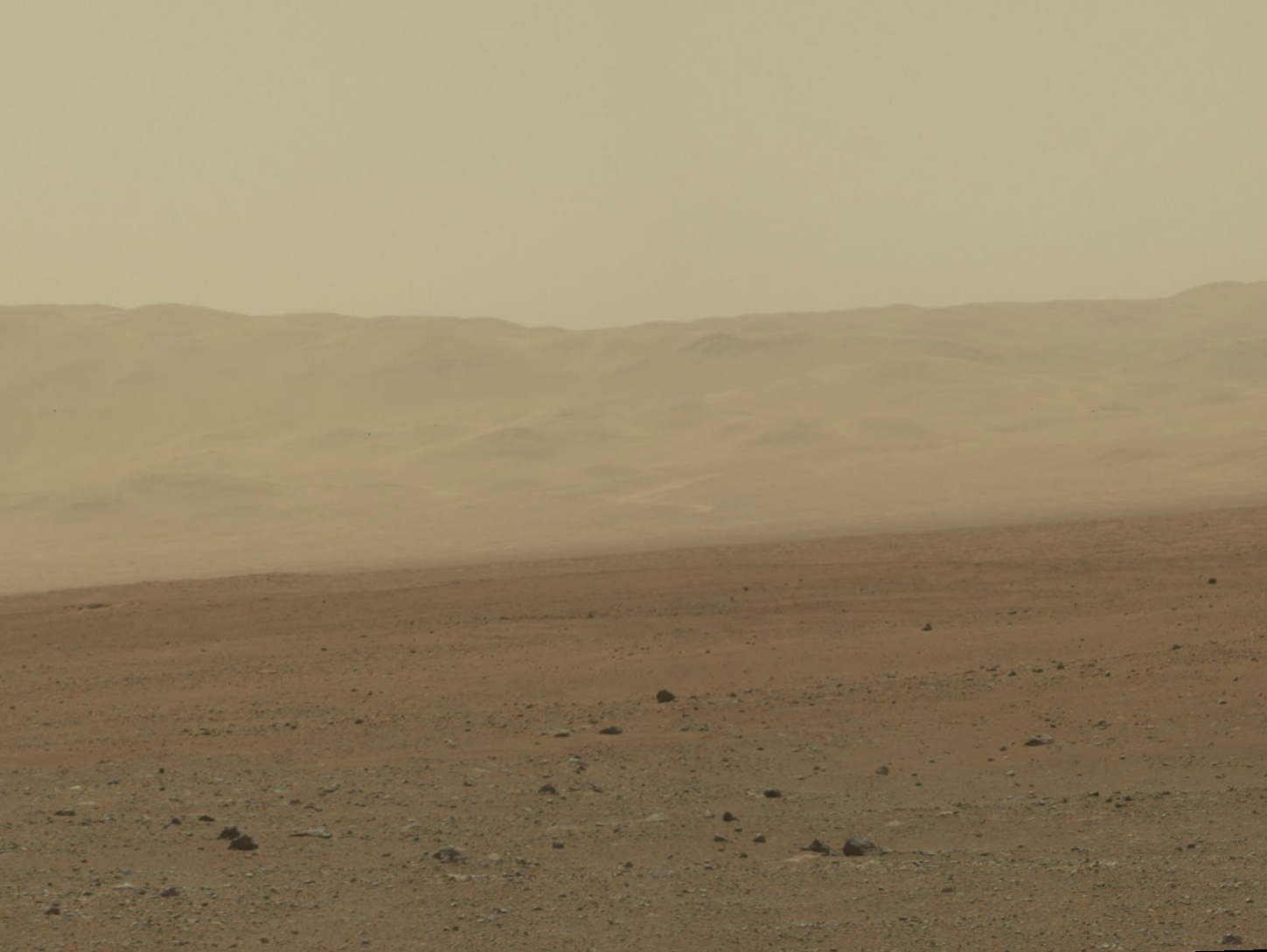
Gale Crater rim about 18 km (11 mi) North of the Curiosity rover (August 9, 2012).

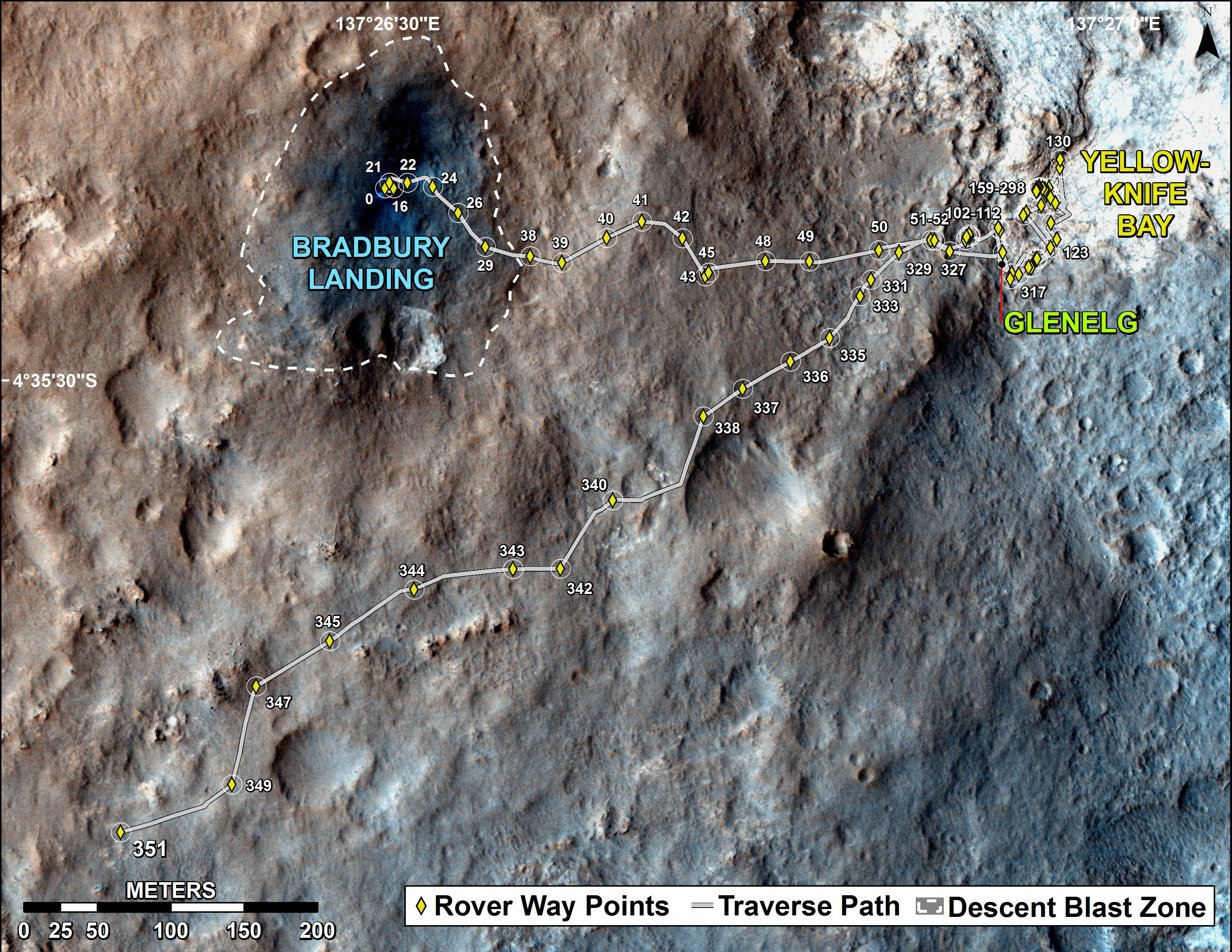
First-Year and First-Mile Traverse Map of the Curiosity rover on Mars (August 1, 2013) (3-D).

== See also ==
- Composition of Mars
- Geology of Mars
- List of craters on Mars
- List of mountains on Mars
- List of rocks on Mars
- List of valleys on Mars
- Martian soil
- Outflow channels
- Timeline of Mars Science Laboratory
- Vallis
- Water on Mars
