= Bradbury Landing =

Landing site of Curiosity rover

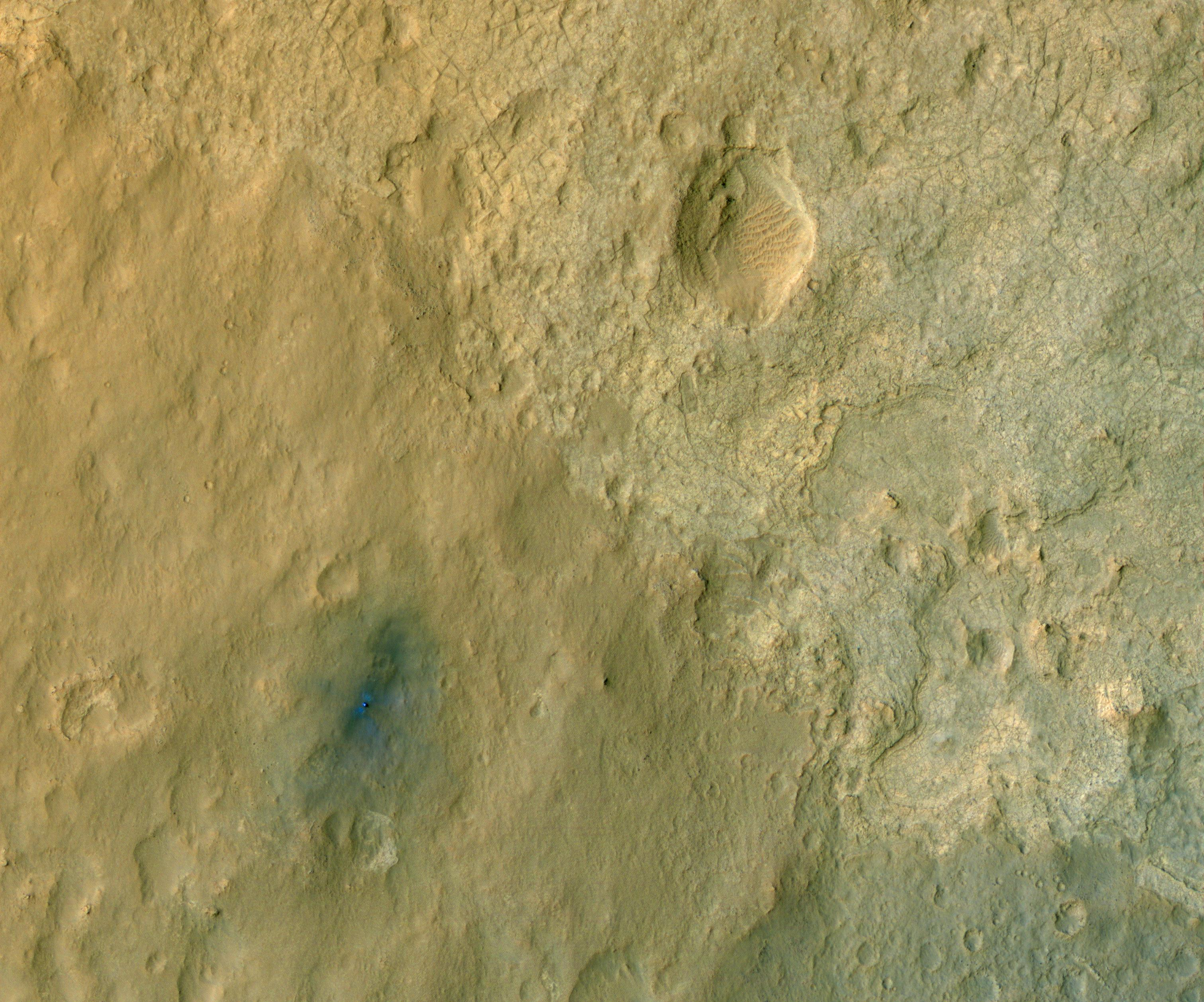
Bradbury Landing – the Curiosity Rover Landing Site (August 14, 2012).

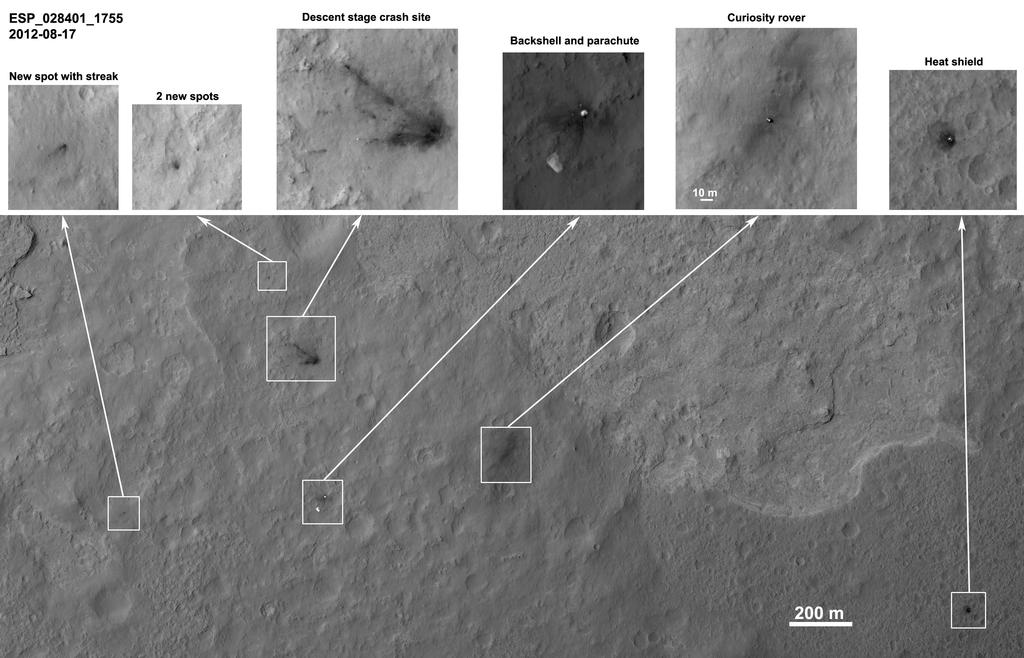
MSL debris field (August 17, 2012). Parachute landed 615 m (2,018 ft) away. (3-D: rover/parachute)

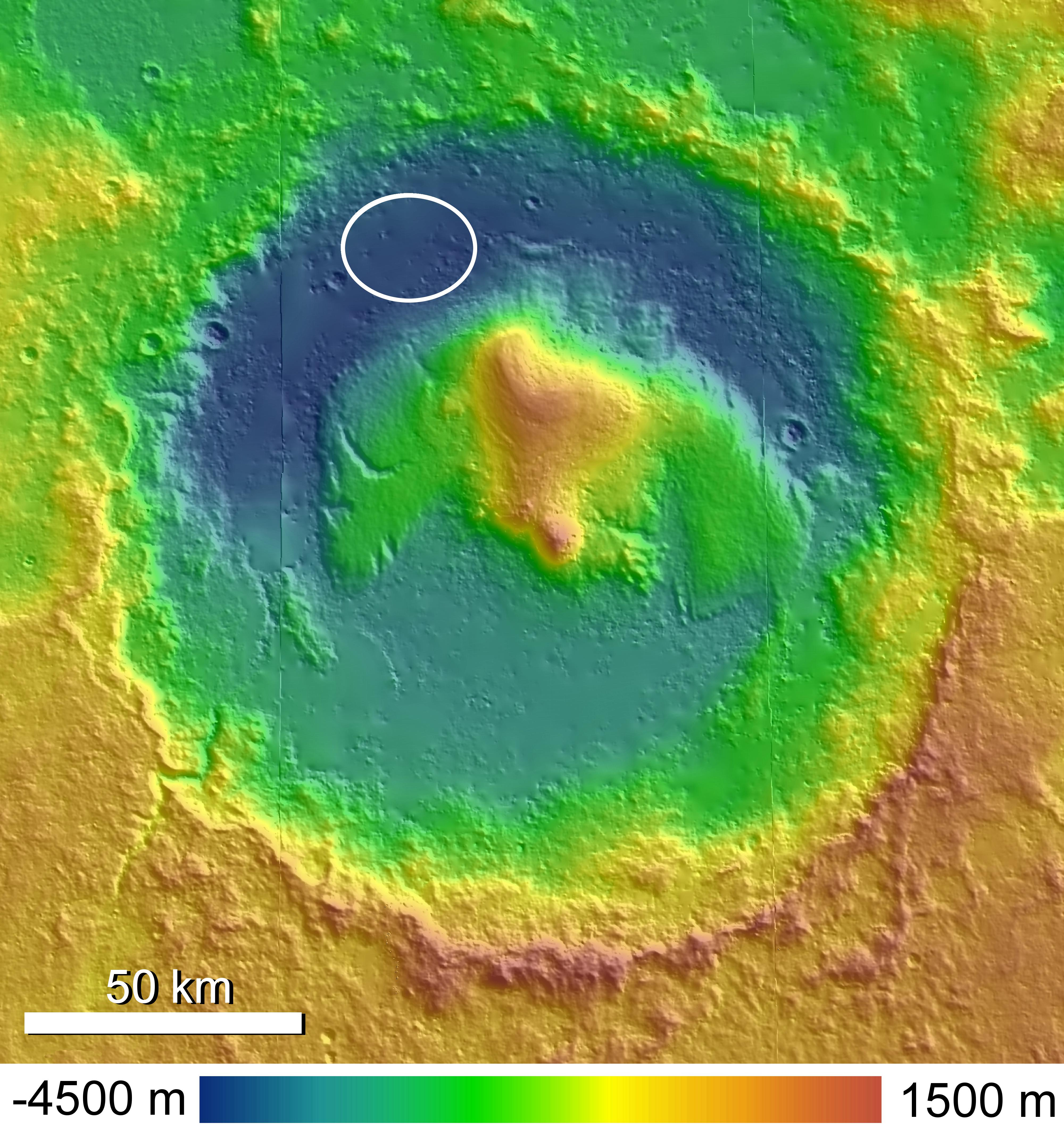
Map of Gale Crater with Aeolis Mons rising in the middle of the crater.

Bradbury Landing is the August 6, 2012, landing site within Gale crater on planet Mars of the Mars Science Laboratory (MSL) Curiosity rover. On August 22, 2012, on what would have been his 92nd birthday, NASA named the site for author Ray Bradbury, who had died on June 5, 2012. The coordinates of the landing site on Mars are: 4.5895°S 137.4417°E.

The rover drove away from this specific landing location in the summer of 2012, but because of the nature of landing there is no actual lander there. The track prints and blast marks are slowly blowing away in the Martian wind, as recorded by Mars orbiters.

== Description ==
Gale Crater was the MSL landing site in 2012. Within Gale Crater is a mountain, named Aeolis Mons ("Mount Sharp"), of layered rocks, rising about 5.5 km (18,000 ft) above the crater floor, that Curiosity will investigate. The landing site is a smooth region in "Yellowknife" Quad 51 of Aeolis Palus inside the crater in front of the mountain. The target landing site location was an elliptical area 20 by 7 km (12.4 by 4.3 mi). Gale Crater's diameter is 154 km (96 mi). The final landing location for the rover was less than 2.4 km (1.5 mi) from the center of the planned landing ellipse, after a 563,000,000 km (350,000,000 mi) journey.

The landing site contains material washed down from the wall of the crater, which will provide scientists with the opportunity to investigate the rocks that form the bedrock in this area. The landing ellipse also contains a rock type that is very dense, very brightly colored, and unlike any rock type previously investigated on Mars. It may be an ancient playa lake deposit, and it will likely be the mission's first target in checking for the presence of organic molecules.

A rock outcrop near the landing site has been named "Goulburn". This rock outcrop, along with several others further eastward, including "Link" and "Hottah", suggest the "vigorous" flow of water in an ancient streambed.

An area of top scientific interest for Curiosity lies at the edge of the landing ellipse and beyond a dark dune field. Here, orbiting instruments have detected signatures of both clay minerals and sulfate salts. Scientists studying Mars have several hypotheses about how these minerals reflect changes in the Martian environment, particularly changes in the amount of water on the surface of Mars. The rover will use its full instrument suite to study these minerals and how they formed. Certain minerals, including the clay and sulfate-rich layers near the bottom of Gale's mountain, are good at latching onto organic compounds—potential biosignatures—and protecting them from oxidation.

Two canyons were cut in the mound through the layers containing clay minerals and sulfate salts after deposition of the layers. These canyons expose layers of rock representing tens or hundreds of millions of years of environmental change. Curiosity may be able to investigate these layers in the canyon closest to the landing ellipse, gaining access to a long history of environmental change on the planet. The canyons also contain sediment that was transported by the water that cut the canyons; this sediment interacted with the water, and the environment at that time may have been habitable. Thus, the rocks deposited at the mouth of the canyon closest to the landing ellipse form the third target in the search for organic molecules.

On March 27, 2015, NASA reported the landing site was fading from view in the two-and-a-half years since landing in 2012.

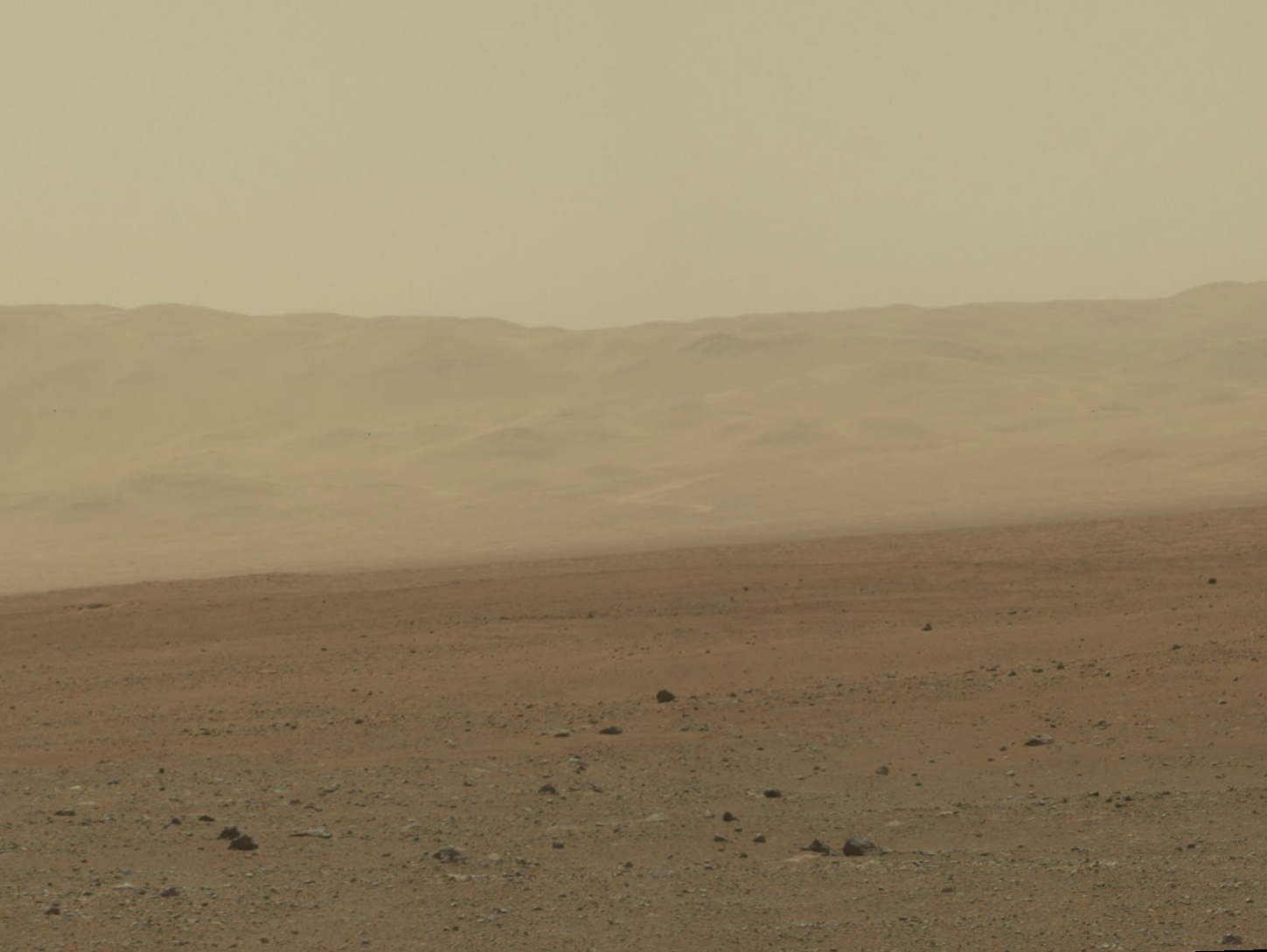
Curiosity rover view from Bradbury Landing (August 9, 2012)

== Ray Bradbury ==
On naming the location, Michael Meyer, NASA program scientist for Curiosity, said "This was not a difficult choice for the science team. Many of us and millions of other readers were inspired in our lives by stories Ray Bradbury wrote to dream of the possibility of life on Mars." Bradbury wrote the 1950 novel The Martian Chronicles about indigenous Martians and the American exploration and settlement of Mars. The Curiosity team left a message on Twitter "In tribute, I dedicate my landing spot on Mars to you, Ray Bradbury. Greetings from Bradbury Landing!" As part of the naming, NASA released a video of Bradbury from 1971 reading his poem "If Only We Had Taller Been" which is about the human quest to explore space.

In honor of the naming of Bradbury Landing, NASA released a video of Ray Bradbury from 1971 reading his poem, "If Only We Had Taller Been" (poem begins at 2:20, full text).

== See also ==
- Aeolis Palus § Bradbury Landing
- Curiosity rover landing site
- List of extraterrestrial memorials
- Octavia E. Butler Landing
- Timeline of Mars Science Laboratory
- Dandelion, crater on the Moon honoring Ray Bradbury
