= Astronomy on Mars =

Astronomical phenomena viewed from the planet Mars

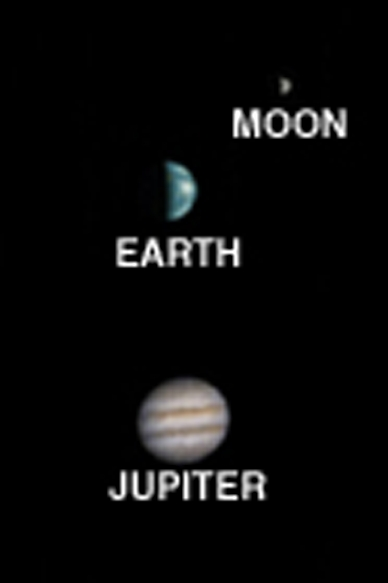
Mosaic of two different Mars Global Surveyor Mars Orbiter Camera (MOC) exposures of Earth, the Moon, and Jupiter from 2003

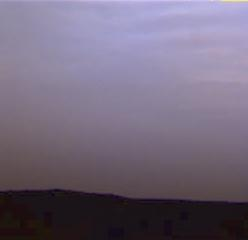
Mars sky turned violet by water ice clouds

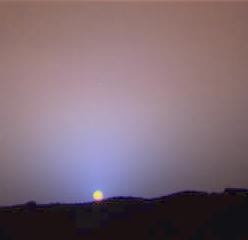
Close-up of Mars sky at sunset, showing more color variation, as imaged by Mars Pathfinder

Many astronomical phenomena viewed from the planet Mars are the same as or similar to those seen from Earth; but some (e.g. the view of Earth as an evening/morning star) are quite different. For example, because the atmosphere of Mars does not contain an ozone layer, it is also possible to make UV observations from the surface of Mars.

== Seasons ==
Mars has an axial tilt of 25.19°, quite close to the value of 23.44° for Earth, and thus Mars has seasons of spring, summer, autumn, winter as Earth does. As on Earth, the southern and northern hemispheres have summer and winter at opposing times.

However, the orbit of Mars has significantly greater eccentricity than that of Earth. Therefore, the seasons are of unequal length, much more so than on Earth:

| Season (considering the beginning to be the respective solstice or equinox) | Sols (on Mars) | Days (on Earth) |
| Season (considering the beginning to be the respective solstice or equinox) | (as % of the year) | |
|---|---|---|
| Northern spring, southern autumn: | 193.30 (29%) | 92.764 (25.4%) |
| Northern summer, southern winter: | 178.64 (27%) | 93.647 (25.6%) |
| Northern autumn, southern spring: | 142.70 (21%) | 89.836 (24.6%) |
| Northern winter, southern summer: | 153.95 (23%) | 88.997 (24.4%) |

In practical terms, this means that summers and winters have different lengths and intensities in the northern and southern hemispheres. Winters in the north are warm and short (because Mars is moving fast near its perihelion), while winters in the south are long and cold (Mars is moving slowly near aphelion). Similarly, summers in the north are long and cool, while summers in the south are short and hot. Therefore, extremes of temperature are considerably wider in the southern hemisphere than in the north.

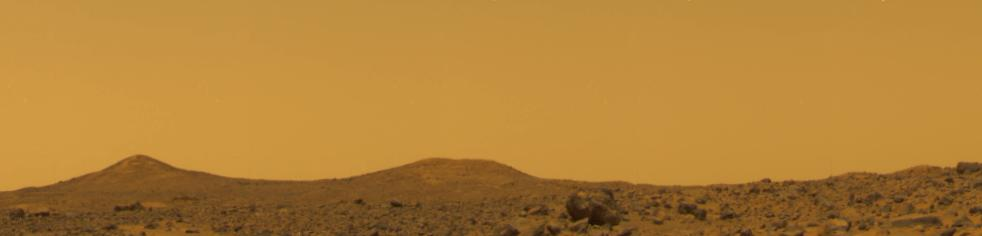
Mars sky at noon, as imaged by Mars Pathfinder (June, 1999).

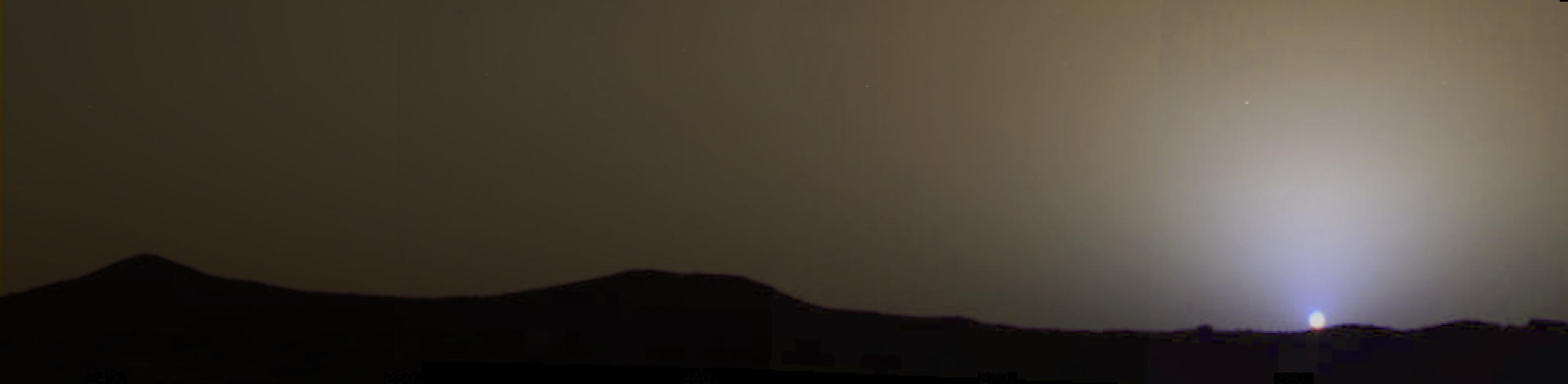
Mars sky at sunset, as imaged by Mars Pathfinder (June, 1999).

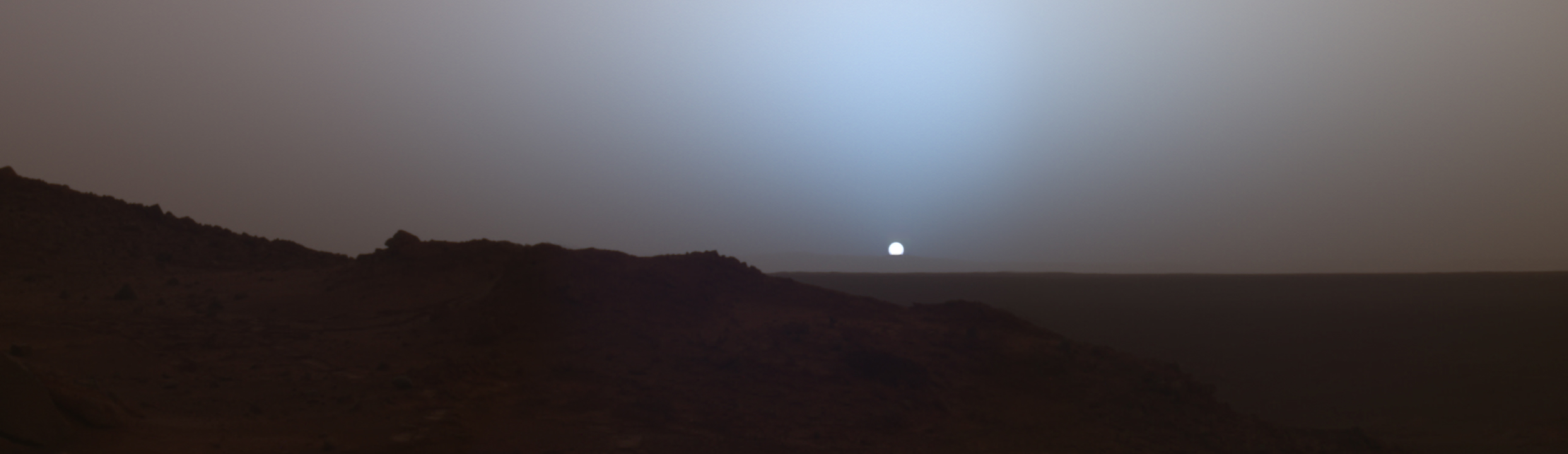
Mars sky at sunset, as imaged by the Spirit rover (May, 2005).

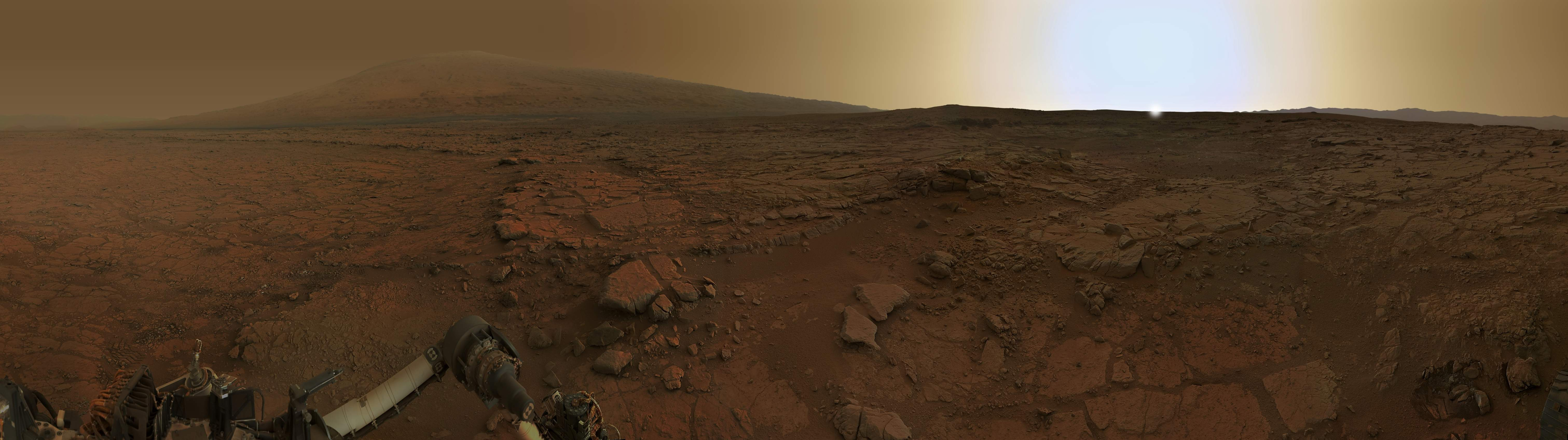
Mars sky at sunset, as imaged by the Curiosity rover (February 2013; Sun simulated by artist).

The seasonal lag on Mars is no more than a couple of days, due to its lack of large bodies of water and similar factors that would provide a buffering effect. Thus, for temperatures on Mars, "spring" is approximately the mirror image of "summer" and "autumn" is approximately the mirror image of "winter" (if the solstices and equinoxes are defined to be the beginnings of their respective seasons), and if Mars had a circular orbit the maximum and minimum temperatures would occur a couple of days after the summer and winter solstices, rather than about one month after, as on Earth. The only difference between spring temperatures and summer temperatures is due to the relatively high eccentricity of Mars's orbit: in northern spring Mars is farther from the Sun than during northern summer, and therefore by coincidence spring is slightly cooler than summer and autumn is slightly warmer than winter. However, in the southern hemisphere the opposite is true.

The temperature variations between spring and summer are much less than the very sharp variations that occur within a single Martian sol (solar day). On a daily basis, temperatures peak at local solar noon and reach a minimum at local midnight. This is similar to the effect in Earth's deserts, only much more pronounced.

The axial tilt and eccentricity of Earth (and Mars) are by no means fixed, but rather vary due to gravitational perturbations from other planets in the Solar System on a timescale of tens of thousands or hundreds of thousands of years. Thus, for example Earth's eccentricity, currently about 1% regularly fluctuates and can increase up to 6%.

Aside from the eccentricity, the Earth's axial tilt can also vary from 21.5° to 24.5°, and the length of this "obliquity cycle" is 41,000 years. These and other similar cyclical changes are thought to be responsible for ice ages (see Milankovitch cycles). By contrast, the obliquity cycle for Mars is much more extreme: from 15° to 35° over a 124,000-year cycle. Some recent studies even suggest that over tens of millions of years, the swing may be as much as 0° to 60°. Earth's large Moon apparently plays an important role in keeping Earth's axial tilt within reasonable bounds; Mars has no such stabilizing influence, and its axial tilt can vary more chaotically.

== The color of the sky ==
The normal hue of the sky during the daytime can vary from a pinkish-red to a yellow-brown “butterscotch” color; however, in the vicinity of the setting or rising sun it is blue. This is the exact opposite of the situation on Earth. On Mars, Rayleigh scattering is usually a very small effect. It is believed that the color of the sky is caused by the presence of 1% by volume of magnetite in the dust particles. Twilight lasts a long time after the Sun has set and before it rises, because of all the dust in Mars's atmosphere. At times, the Martian sky takes on a violet color, due to scattering of light by very small water ice particles in clouds.

Generating accurate true-color images of Mars's surface is surprisingly complicated. There is much variation in the color of the sky as reproduced in published images; many of those images, however, are using filters to maximize the scientific value and are not trying to show true color. Nevertheless, for many years, the sky on Mars was thought to be more pinkish than it now is believed to be.

== Astronomical phenomena ==
=== Earth and Moon ===
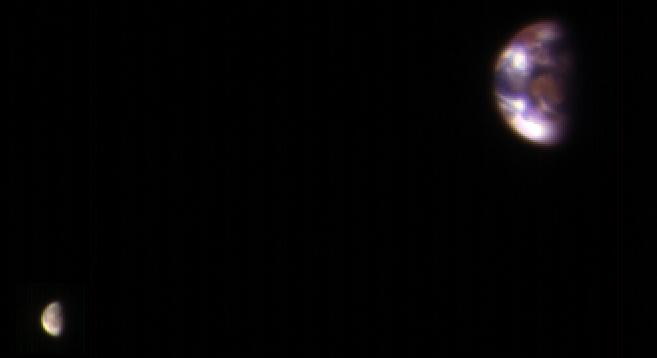
Earth and the Moon as viewed from Mars (MRO; HiRISE; November 20, 2016)

As seen from Mars, the Earth is an inner planet like Venus (a "morning star" or "evening star"). The Earth and Moon appear starlike to the naked eye, but observers with telescopes would see them as crescents, with some detail visible.

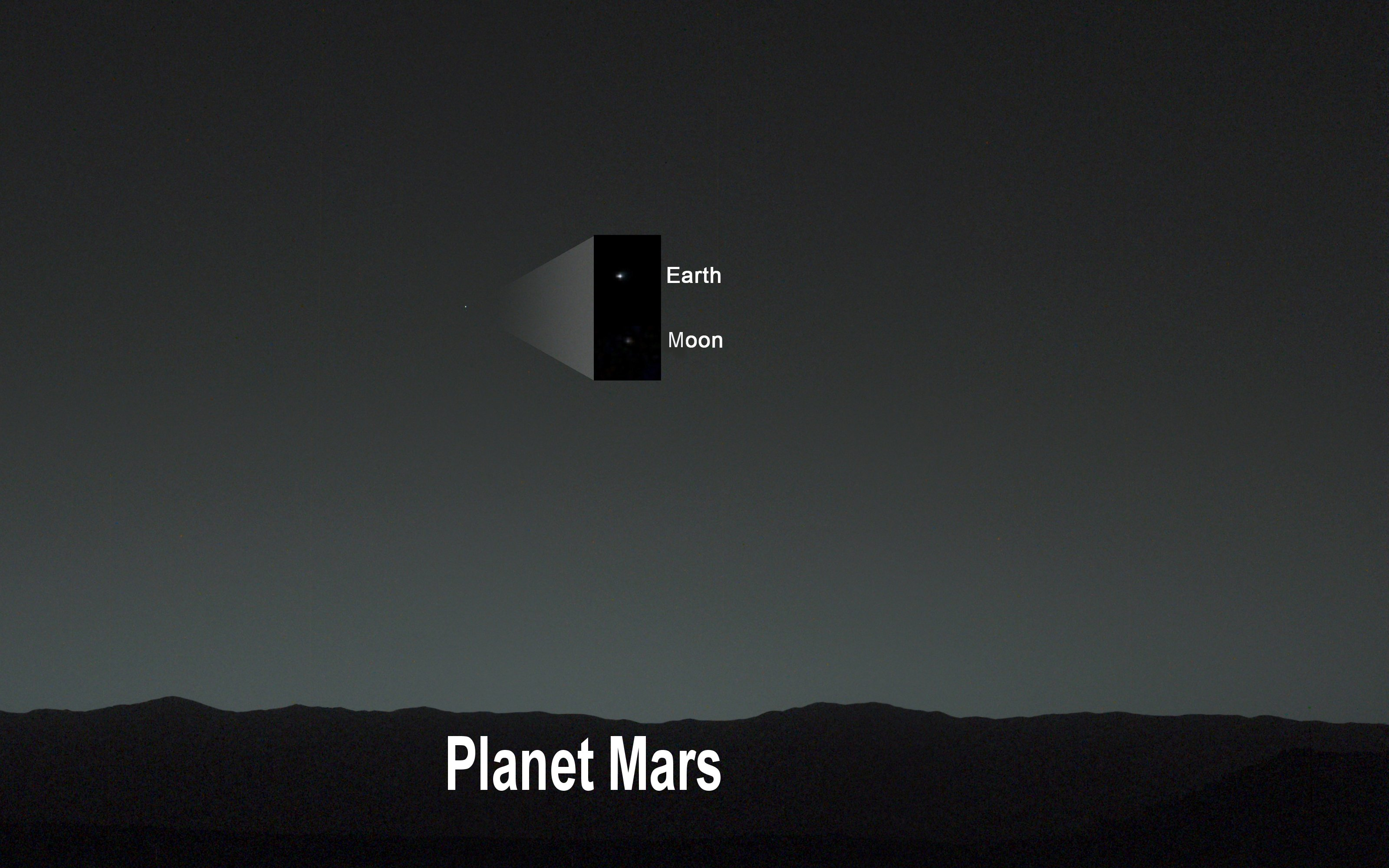
Curiosity's first view of the Earth and the Moon from the surface of Mars (January 31, 2014).

An observer on Mars would be able to see the Moon orbiting around the Earth, and this would easily be visible to the naked eye. By contrast, observers on Earth cannot see any other planet's satellites with the naked eye, and it was not until soon after the invention of the telescope that the first such satellites were discovered (Jupiter's Galilean moons).

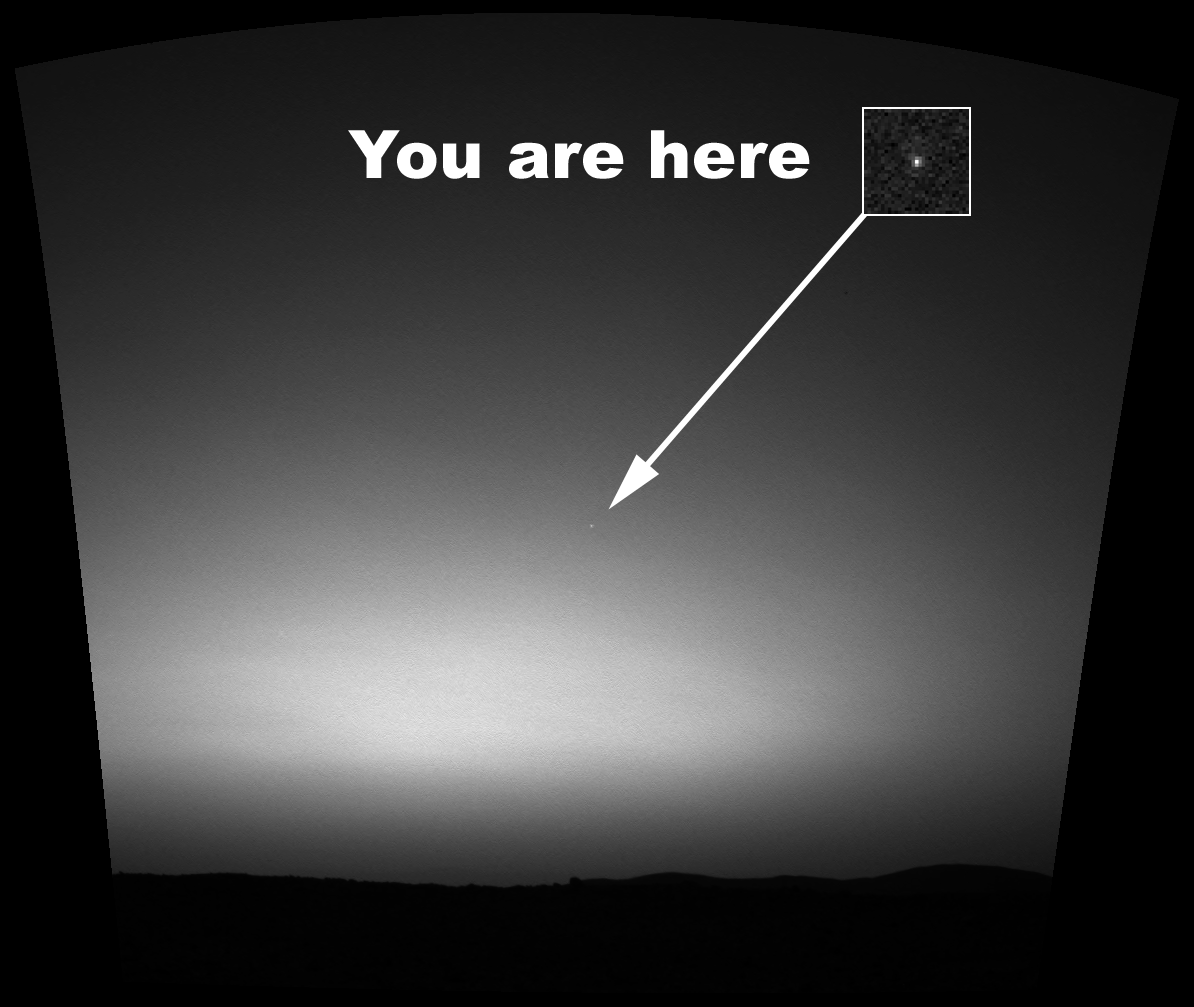
Earth as morning star, imaged by MER Spirit on March 7, 2004

At maximum angular separation, the Earth and Moon would be easily distinguished as a double planet, but about one week later they would merge into a single point of light (to the naked eye), and then about a week after that, the Moon would reach maximum angular separation on the opposite side. The maximum angular separation of the Earth and Moon varies considerably according to the relative distance between the Earth and Mars: it is about 25′ (arcminutes) when Earth is closest to Mars (near inferior conjunction) but only about 3.5′ when the Earth is farthest from Mars (near superior conjunction). For comparison, the apparent diameter of the Moon from Earth is 31′.

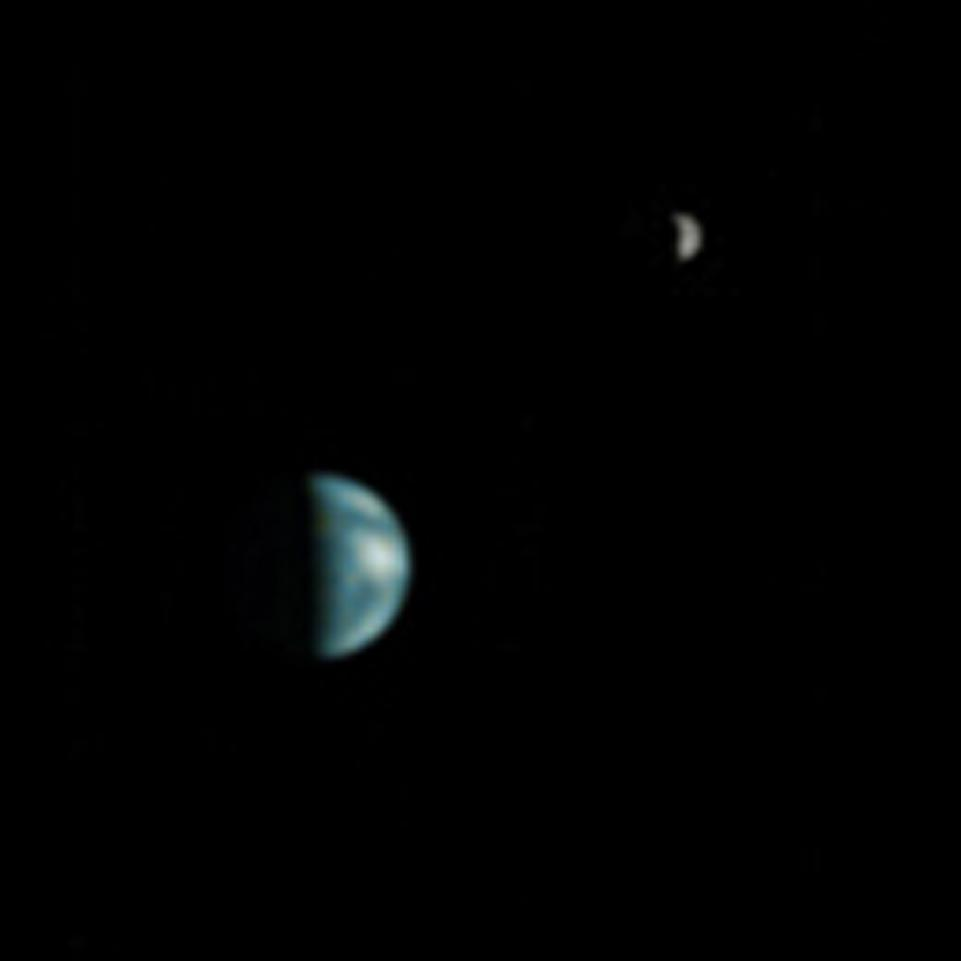
Earth and Moon from Mars, imaged by Mars Global Surveyor on May 8, 2003, 13:00 UTC. South America is visible.

The minimum angular separation would be less than 1′, and occasionally the Moon would be seen to transit in front of or pass behind (be occulted by) the Earth. The former case would correspond to a lunar occultation of Mars as seen from Earth, and because the Moon's albedo is considerably less than that of the Earth, a dip in overall brightness would occur, although this would be too small to be noticeable by casual naked eye observers because the size of the Moon is much smaller than that of the Earth and it would cover only a small fraction of the Earth's disk.

Mars Global Surveyor imaged the Earth and Moon on May 8, 2003, 13:00 UTC, very close to maximum angular elongation from the Sun and at a distance of 0.930 AU from Mars. The apparent magnitudes were given as −2.5 and +0.9. At different times the actual magnitudes will vary considerably depending on distance and the phases of the Earth and Moon.

From one day to the next, the view of the Moon would change considerably for an observer on Mars than for an observer on Earth. The phase of the Moon as seen from Mars would not change much from day to day; it would match the phase of the Earth, and would only gradually change as both Earth and Moon move in their orbits around the Sun. On the other hand, an observer on Mars would see the Moon rotate, with the same period as its orbital period, and would see far side features that can never be seen from Earth.

Since Earth is an inferior planet, observers on Mars can occasionally view transits of Earth across the Sun. The next one will take place in 2084. They can also view transits of Mercury and transits of Venus.

=== Phobos and Deimos ===
Phobos eclipses the Sun, imaged by MER

The moon Phobos appears about one third the angular diameter that the full Moon appears from Earth; on the other hand, Deimos appears more or less starlike with a disk barely discernible if at all. Phobos orbits so fast (with a period of just under one third of a sol) that it rises in the west and sets in the east, and does so twice per sol; Deimos on the other hand rises in the east and sets in the west, but orbits only a few hours slower than a Martian sol, so it spends about two and a half sols above the horizon at a time.

The maximum brightness of Phobos at "full moon" is about magnitude −9 or −10, while for Deimos it is about −5. By comparison, the full Moon as seen from Earth is considerably brighter at magnitude −12.7. Phobos is still bright enough to cast shadows; Deimos is only slightly brighter than Venus is from Earth. Just like Earth's Moon, both Phobos and Deimos are considerably fainter at non-full phases. Unlike Earth's Moon, Phobos's phases and angular diameter visibly change from hour to hour; Deimos is too small for its phases to be visible with the naked eye.

Both Phobos and Deimos have low-inclination equatorial orbits and orbit fairly close to Mars. As a result, Phobos is not visible from latitudes north of 70.4°N or south of 70.4°S; Deimos is not visible from latitudes north of 82.7°N or south of 82.7°S. Observers at high latitudes (less than 70.4°) would see a noticeably smaller angular diameter for Phobos because they are farther away from it. Similarly, equatorial observers of Phobos would see a noticeably smaller angular diameter for Phobos when it is rising and setting, compared to when it is overhead.

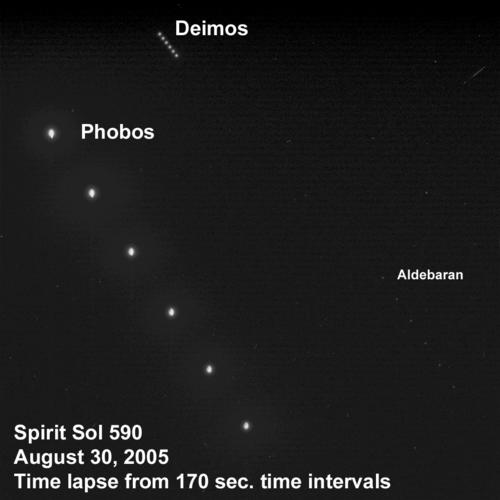
Phobos and Deimos from the Spirit rover. Courtesy NASA/JPL-Caltech

Observers on Mars can view transits of Phobos and transits of Deimos across the Sun. The transits of Phobos could also be called partial eclipses of the Sun by Phobos, since the angular diameter of Phobos is up to half the angular diameter of the Sun. However, in the case of Deimos the term "transit" is appropriate, since it appears as a small dot on the Sun's disk.

Since Phobos orbits in a low-inclination equatorial orbit, there is a seasonal variation in the latitude of the position of Phobos's shadow projected onto the Martian surface, cycling from far north to far south and back again. At any given fixed geographical location on Mars, there are two intervals per Martian year when the shadow is passing through its latitude and about half a dozen transits of Phobos can be observed at that geographical location over a couple of weeks during each such interval. The situation is similar for Deimos, except only zero or one transits occur during such an interval.

It is easy to see that the shadow always falls on the "winter hemisphere", except when it crosses the equator during the vernal and the autumnal equinoxes. Thus transits of Phobos and Deimos happen during Martian autumn and winter in the northern hemisphere and the southern hemisphere. Close to the equator they tend to happen around the autumnal equinox and the vernal equinox; farther from the equator they tend to happen closer to the winter solstice. In either case, the two intervals when transits can take place occur more or less symmetrically before and after the winter solstice (however, the large eccentricity of Mars's orbit prevents true symmetry).

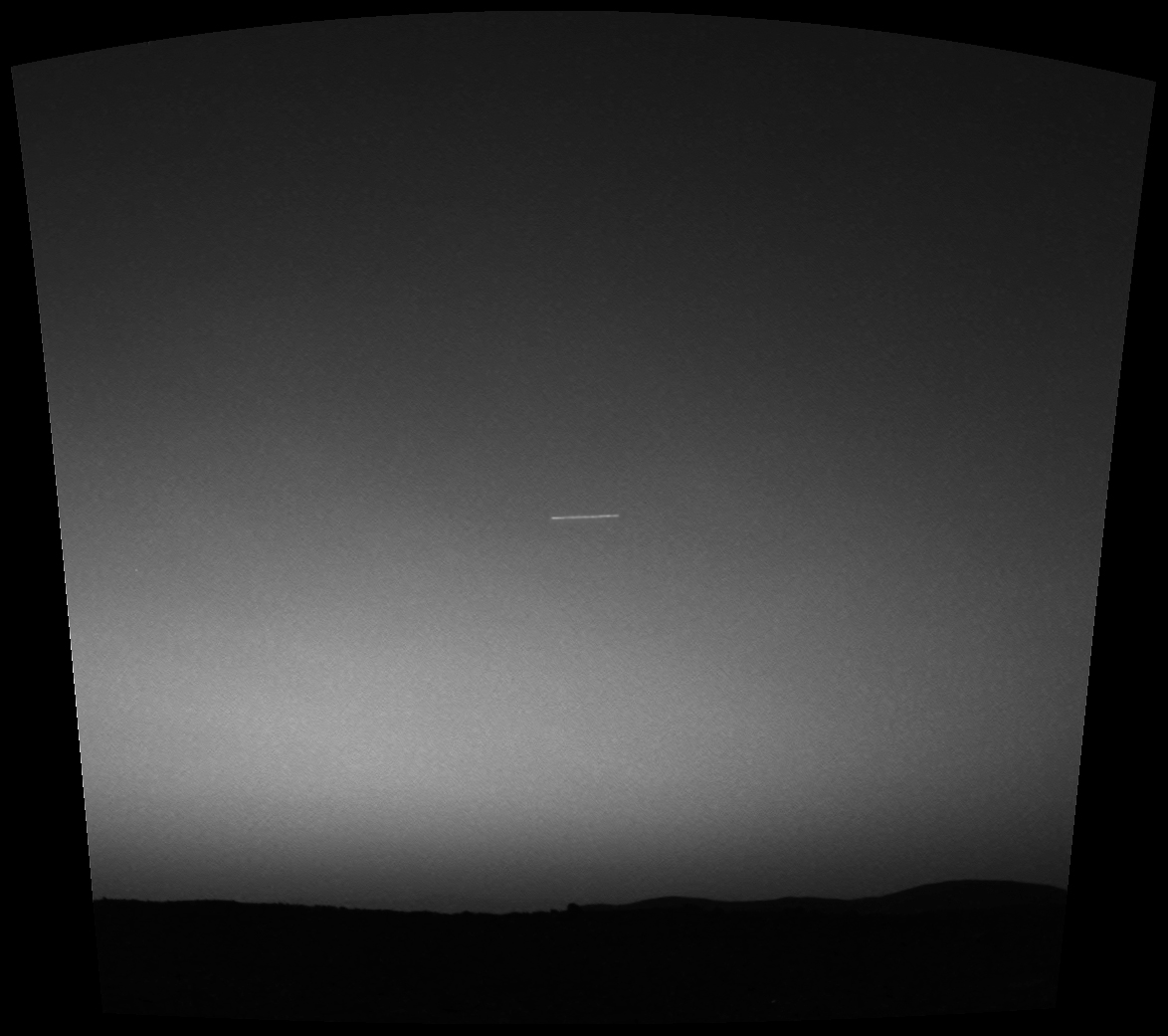
First meteor photographed from Mars, March 7, 2004, by MER Spirit

Observers on Mars can also view lunar eclipses of Phobos and Deimos. Phobos spends about an hour in Mars's shadow; for Deimos it is about two hours. Surprisingly, despite its orbit being nearly in the plane of Mars's equator and despite its very close distance to Mars, there are some occasions when Phobos escapes being eclipsed.

Phobos and Deimos both have synchronous rotation, which means that they have a "far side" that observers on the surface of Mars can't see. The phenomenon of libration occurs for Phobos as it does for Earth's Moon, despite the low inclination and eccentricity of Phobos's orbit. Due to the effect of librations and the parallax due to the close distance of Phobos, by observing at high and low latitudes and observing as Phobos is rising and setting, the overall total coverage of Phobos's surface that is visible at one time or another from one location or another on Mars's surface is considerably higher than 50%.

The large Stickney crater is visible along one edge of the face of Phobos. It would be easily visible with the naked eye from the surface of Mars.

=== Comets and meteors ===
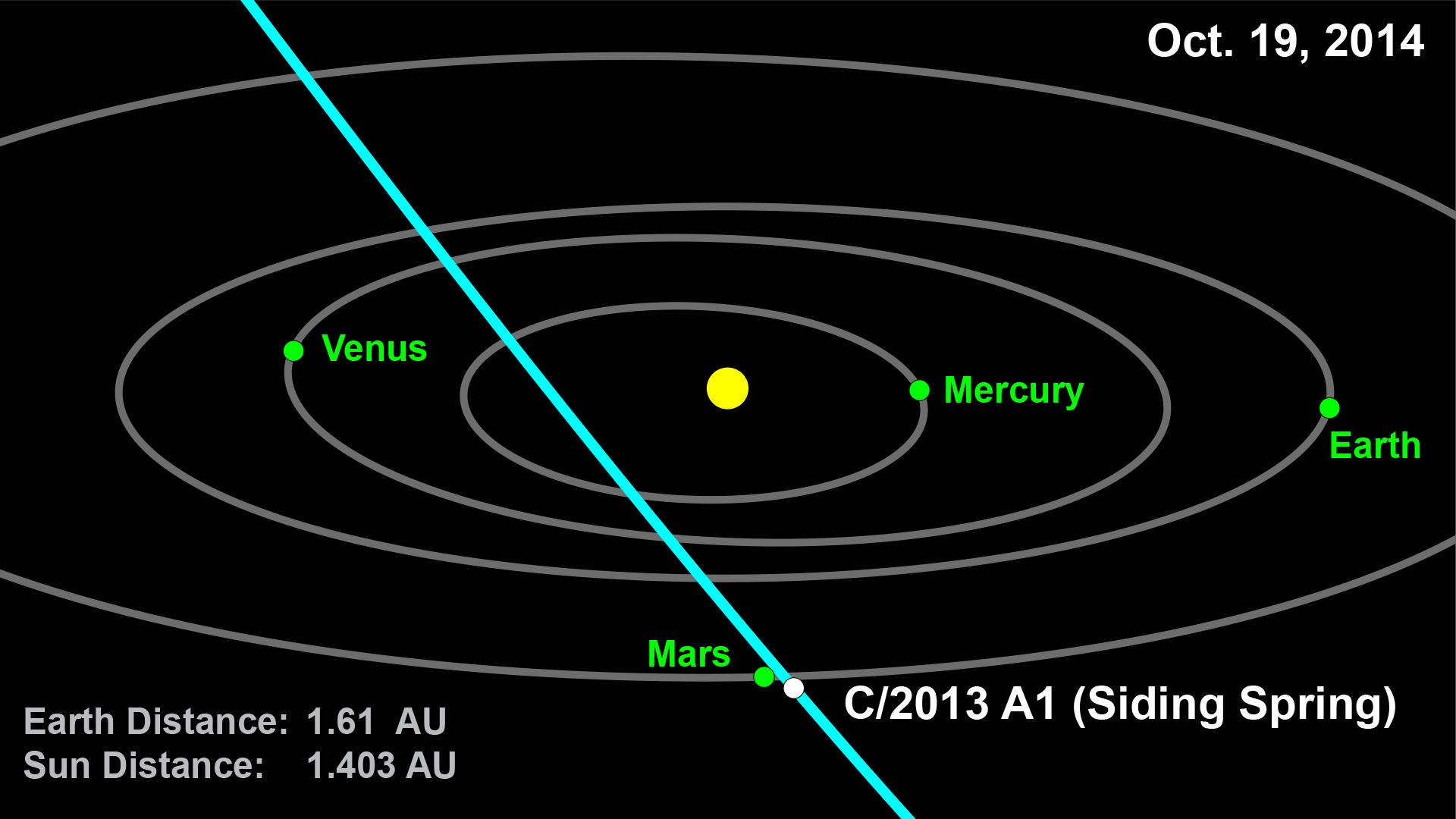
Projected path of Comet Siding Spring passing Mars on 19 October 2014.

Since Mars has an atmosphere that is relatively transparent at optical wavelengths (just like Earth, albeit much thinner), meteors will occasionally be seen. Meteor showers on Earth occur when the Earth intersects the orbit of a comet, and likewise, Mars also has meteor showers, although these are different from the ones on Earth.

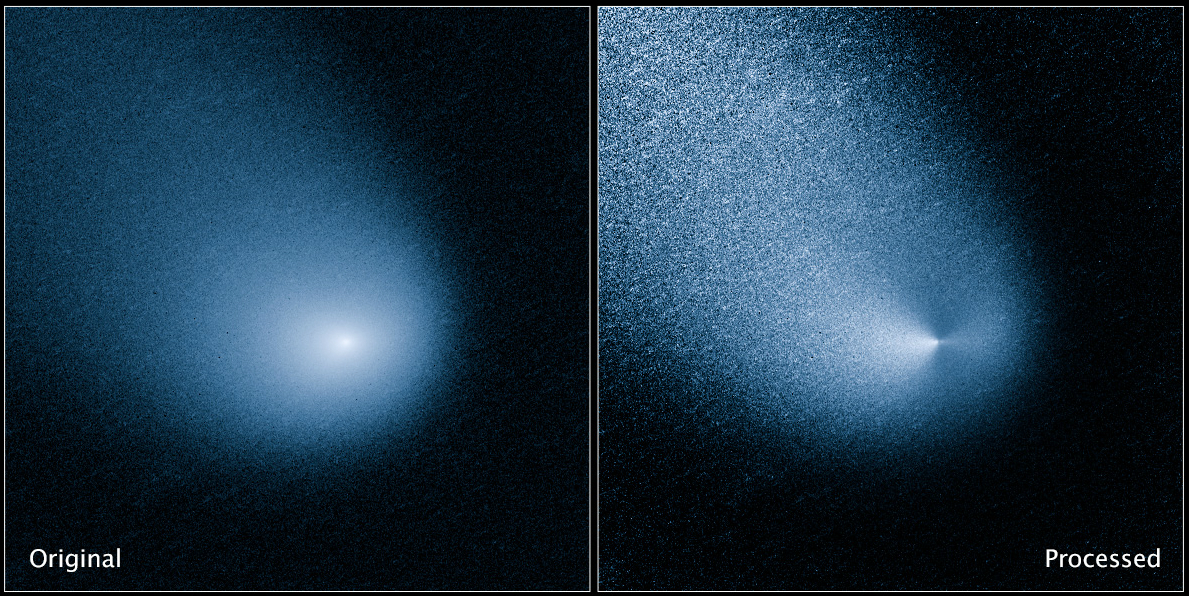
Comet Siding Spring as seen by Hubble on 11 March 2014.

The first meteor photographed on Mars (on March 7, 2004, by the Spirit rover) is now believed to have been part of a meteor shower whose parent body was comet 114P/Wiseman-Skiff. Because the radiant was in the constellation Cepheus, this meteor shower could be dubbed the Martian Cepheids.

As on Earth, when a meteor is large enough to actually hit the surface (without burning up completely in the atmosphere), it becomes a meteorite. The first known meteorite discovered on Mars (and the third known meteorite found someplace other than Earth) was Heat Shield Rock. The first and the second ones were found on the Moon by the Apollo missions.

On October 19, 2014, Comet Siding Spring passed extremely close to Mars, so close that the coma may have enveloped the planet.

Comet Siding Spring Mars flyby on October 19, 2014 (artist's concepts)

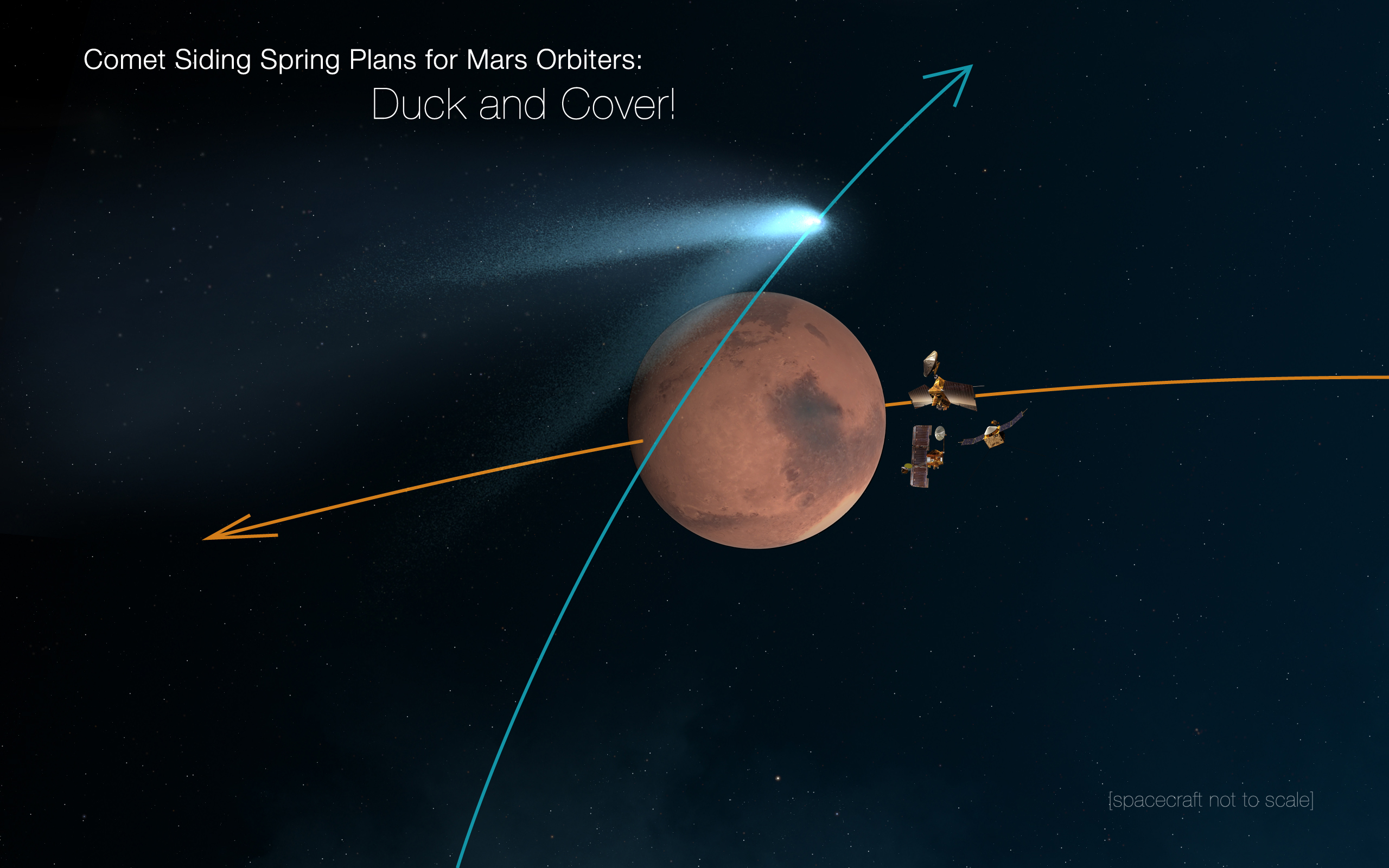
POV: Universe

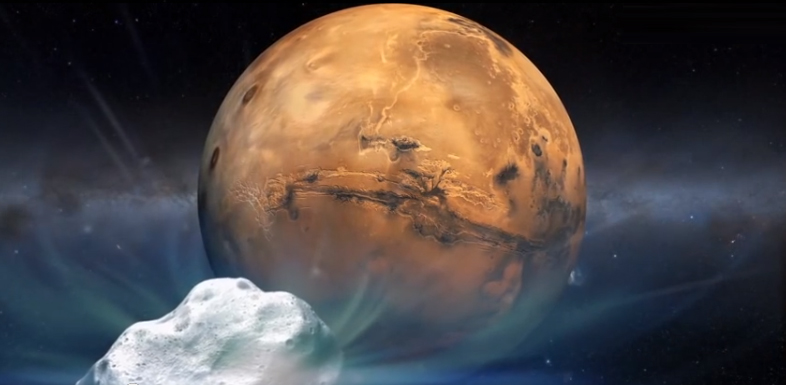
POV: Comet

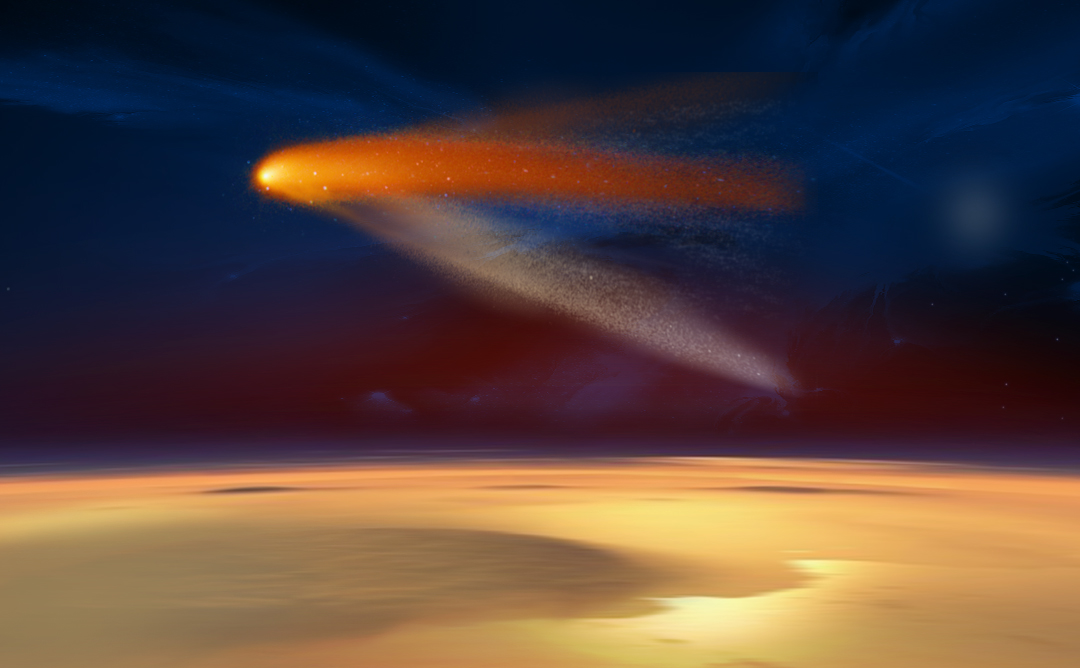
POV: Mars

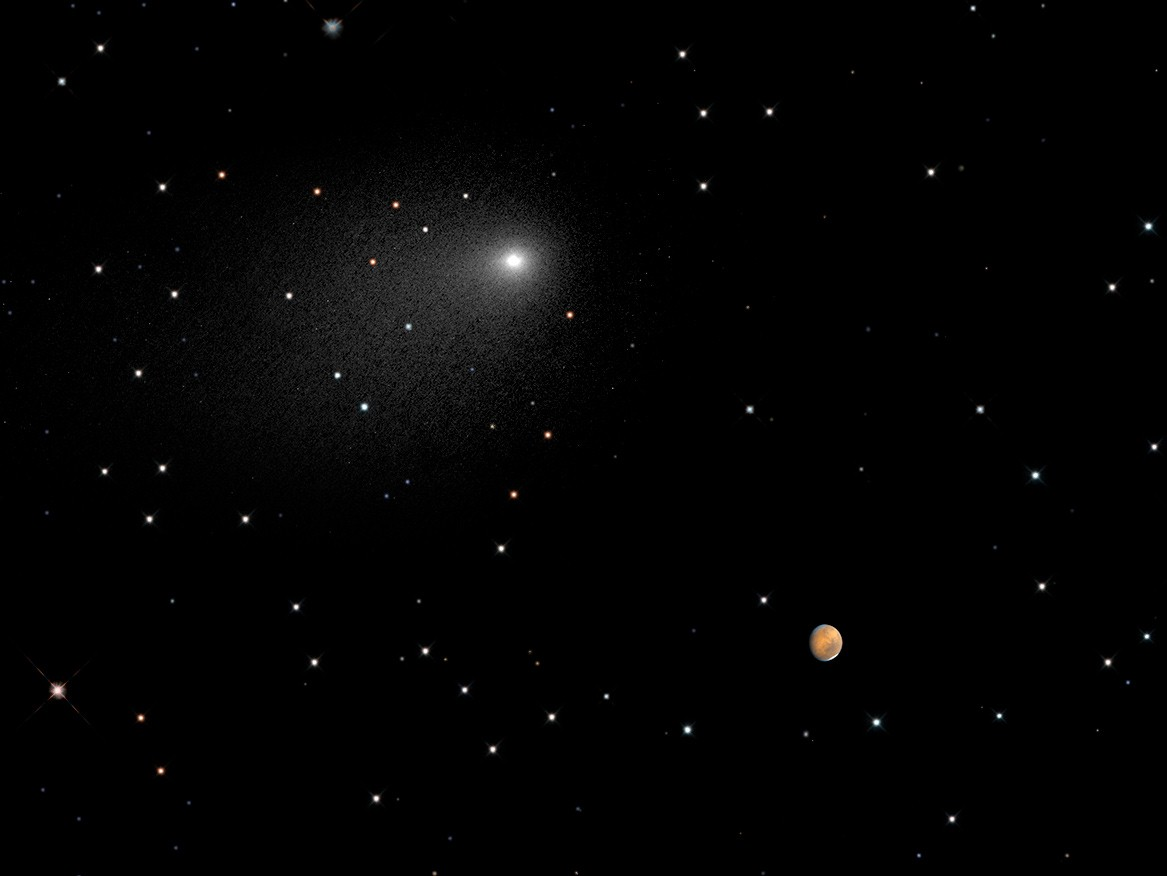
Close encounter of Comet Siding Spring with the planet Mars
(composite image; Hubble ST; October 19, 2014).

=== Auroras ===
Auroras occur on Mars, but they do not occur at the poles as on Earth, because Mars has no planetwide magnetic field. Rather, they occur near magnetic anomalies in Mars's crust, which are remnants from earlier days when Mars did have a magnetic field. Martian auroras are a distinct kind not seen elsewhere in the Solar System. They would probably also be invisible to the human eye, being largely ultraviolet phenomena.

=== Celestial poles and ecliptic ===
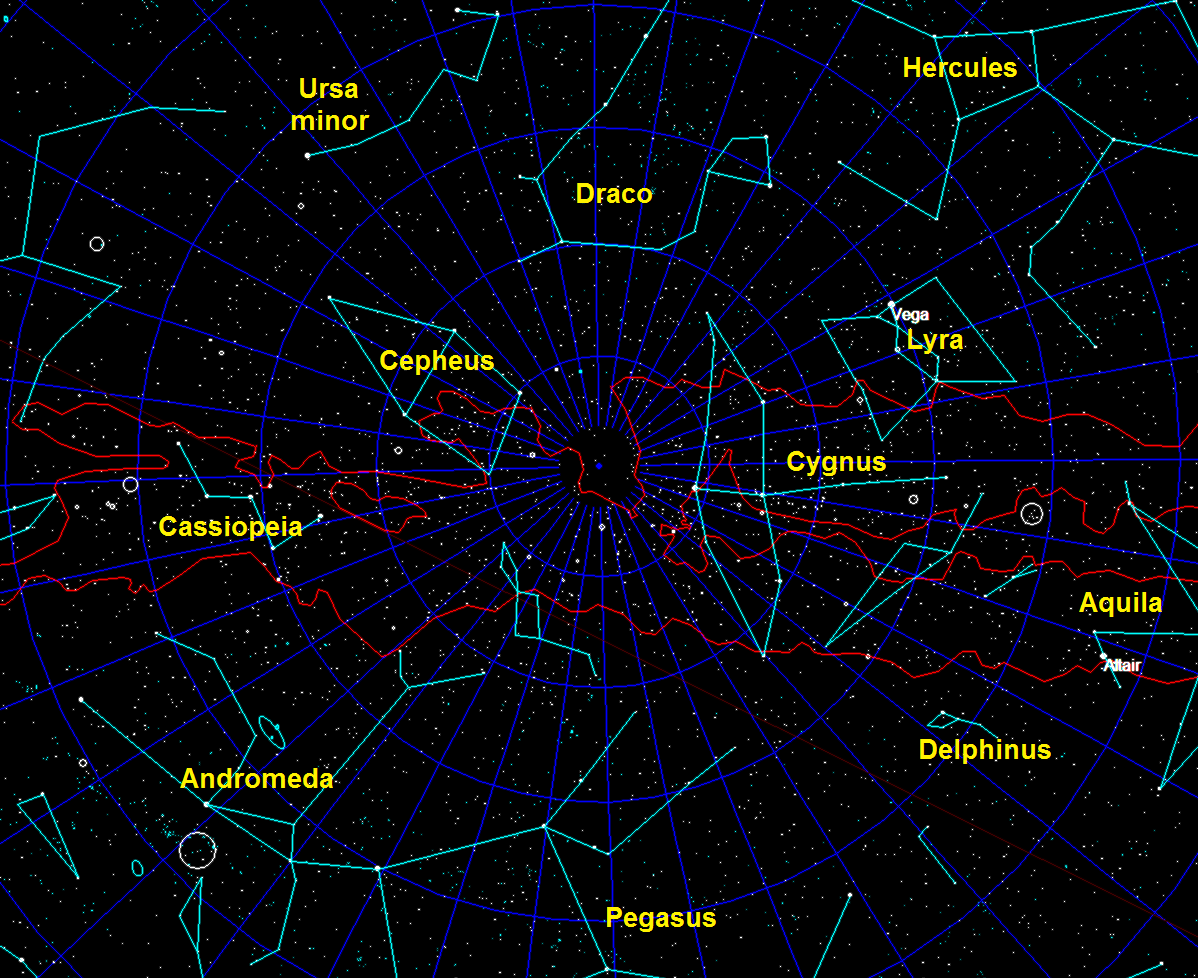
Celestial north pole on Mars

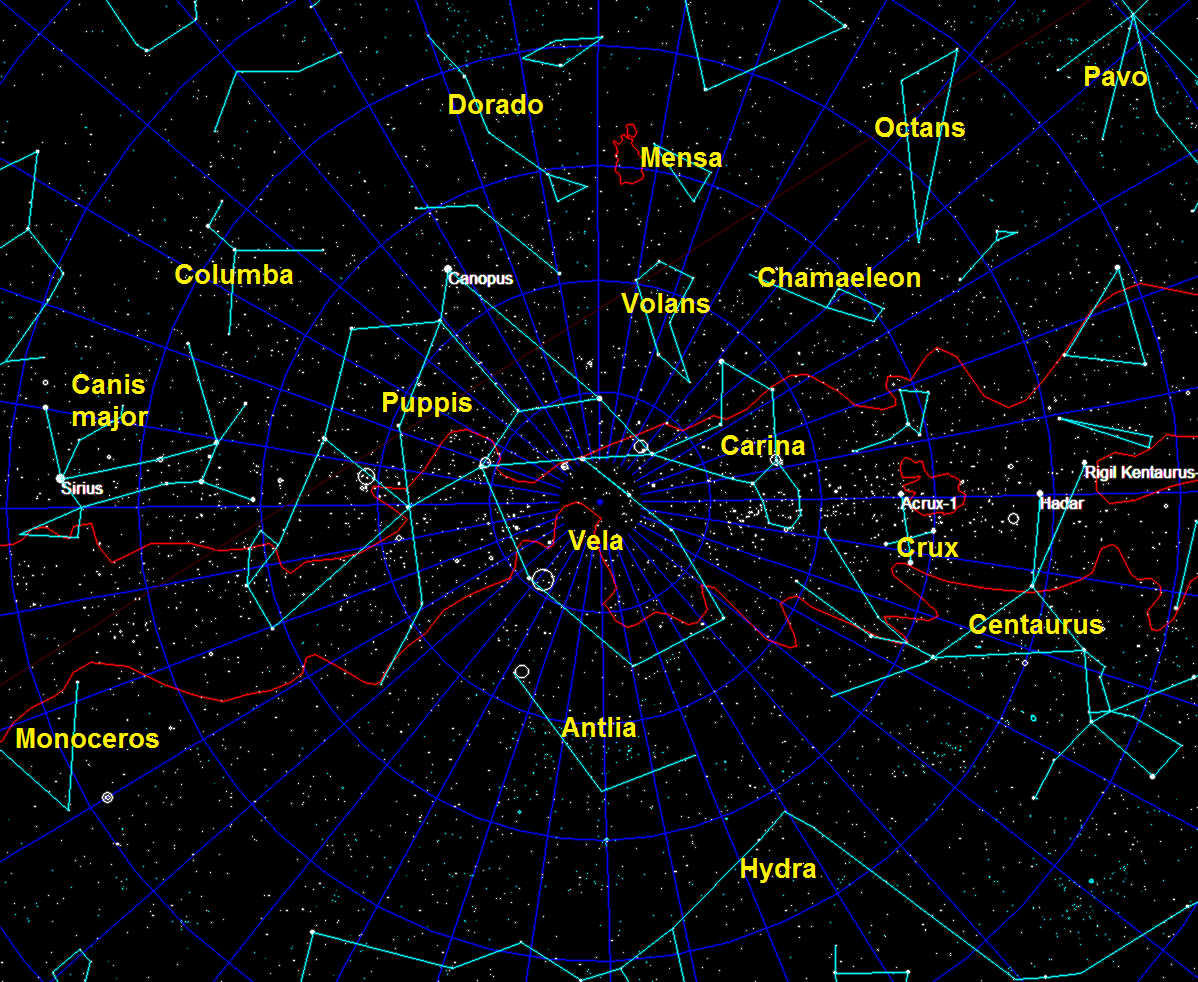
Celestial south pole on Mars

The orientation of Mars's axis is such that its north celestial pole is in Cygnus at R.A. 21^{h} 10^{m} 42^{s} Decl. +52° 53.0′ (or more precisely, 317.67669 +52.88378), near the 6th-magnitude star BD +52 2880 (also known as HR 8106, HD 201834, or SAO 33185), which in turn is at R.A. 21^{h} 10^{m} 15.6^{s} Decl. +53° 33′ 48″.

The top two stars in the Northern Cross, Sadr and Deneb, point to the north celestial pole of Mars. The pole is about halfway between Deneb and Alpha Cephei, less than 10° from the former, a bit more than the apparent distance between Sadr and Deneb. Because of its proximity to the pole, Deneb never sets in nearly all of Mars's northern hemisphere. Except in areas close to the equator, Deneb permanently circles the North pole. The orientation of Deneb and Sadr would make a useful clock hand for telling sidereal time.

Mars's north celestial pole is also only a few degrees away from the galactic plane. Thus the Milky Way, especially rich in the area of Cygnus, is always visible from the northern hemisphere.

The South celestial pole is correspondingly found at 9^{h} 10^{m} 42^{s} and −52° 53.0′, which is a couple of degrees from the 2.5-magnitude star Kappa Velorum (which is at 9^{h} 22^{m} 06.85^{s} −55° 00.6′), which could therefore be considered the southern polar star. The star Canopus, second-brightest in the sky, is a circumpolar star for most southern latitudes.

The zodiac constellations of Mars's ecliptic are almost the same as those of Earth — after all, the two ecliptic planes only have a mutual inclination of 1.85° — but on Mars, the Sun spends 6 days in the constellation Cetus, leaving and re-entering Pisces as it does so, making a total of 14 zodiacal constellations. The equinoxes and solstices are different as well: for the northern hemisphere, vernal equinox is in Ophiuchus (compared to Pisces on Earth), summer solstice is at the border of Aquarius and Pisces, autumnal equinox is in Taurus, and winter solstice is in Virgo.

As on Earth, precession will cause the solstices and equinoxes to cycle through the zodiac constellations over thousands and tens of thousands of years.

=== Long-term variations ===
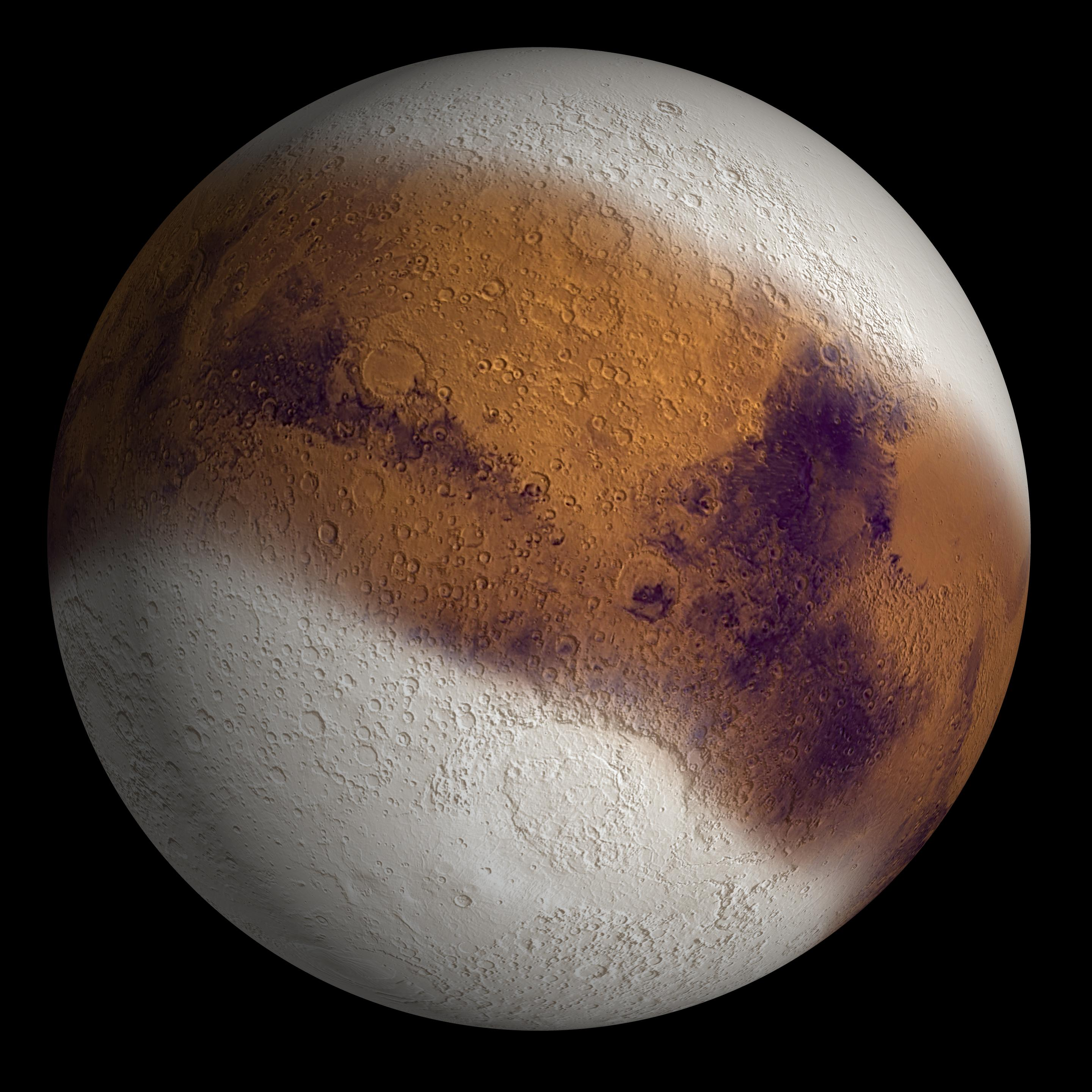
An illustration of what Mars may have looked like during an ice age about 400,000 years ago caused by a large axial tilt

As on Earth, the effect of precession causes the north and south celestial poles to move in a very large circle, but on Mars the cycle is 95,500 Martian years (179,600 Earth years) rather than 26,000 years as on Earth.

As on Earth, there is a second form of precession: the point of perihelion in Mars's orbit changes slowly, causing the anomalistic year to differ from the sidereal year. However, on Mars, this cycle is 43,000 Martian years (81,000 Earth years) rather than 112,000 years as on Earth.

On both Earth and Mars, these two precessions are in opposite directions, and therefore add, to make the precession cycle between the tropical and anomalistic years 21,000 years on Earth and 29,700 Martian years (55,900 Earth years) on Mars.

As on Earth, the period of rotation of Mars (the length of its day) is slowing down. However, this effect is three orders of magnitude smaller than on Earth because the gravitational effect of Phobos is negligible and the effect is mainly due to the Sun. On Earth, the gravitational influence of the Moon has a much greater effect. Eventually, in the far future, the length of a day on Earth will equal and then exceed the length of a day on Mars.

As on Earth, Mars experiences Milankovitch cycles that cause its axial tilt (obliquity) and orbital eccentricity to vary over long periods of time, which has long-term effects on its climate. The variation of Mars's axial tilt is much larger than for Earth because it lacks the stabilizing influence of a large moon like Earth's Moon. Mars has a 124,000-year obliquity cycle compared to 41,000 years for Earth.

== See also ==
- Climate of Mars
- Extraterrestrial skies
- Timekeeping on Mars
- Transit of Deimos from Mars
- Transit of Earth from Mars
- Transit of Mercury from Mars
- Transit of Phobos from Mars
- Astronomy on Mercury
