= Transit of Phobos from Mars =

Transit of a moon from Mars

Phobos transits the Sun, as viewed by the Perseverance rover on 2 April 2022

A transit of Phobos across the Sun as seen from Mars takes place when Phobos passes directly between the Sun and a point on the surface of Mars, obscuring a large part of the Sun's disc for an observer on Mars. During a transit, Phobos can be seen from Mars as a large black disc rapidly moving across the face of the Sun. At the same time, the shadow (antumbra) of Phobos moves across the Martian surface.

The event could also be regarded as a particularly quick and shallow annular solar eclipse by Phobos.

== Transit ==
Video (01:30/real-time): Eclipse of the Sun by Phobos, larger of the two moons of Mars (Curiosity rover, 20 August 2013).

A transit of Phobos from Mars usually lasts only thirty seconds or so due to the moon's very rapid orbital period of approximately 7.6 hours.

Because Phobos orbits close to Mars and in line with its equator, transits of Phobos occur somewhere on Mars on most days of the Martian year. Its orbital inclination is 1.08°, so the latitude of its shadow projected onto the Martian surface shows a seasonal variation, moving from 70.4°S to 70.4°N and back again over the course of a Martian year. Phobos is so close to Mars that it is not visible south of 70.4°S or north of 70.4°N; for some days in the year, its shadow misses the surface entirely and falls north or south of Mars.

At any given geographical location on the surface of Mars, there are two intervals in a Martian year when the shadow of Phobos or Deimos is passing through its latitude. During each such interval, about half a dozen transits of Phobos can be seen by observers at that geographical location (compared to zero or one transits of Deimos). Transits of Phobos happen during Martian autumn and winter in the respective hemisphere; close to the equator they happen around the March and September equinoxes, while farther from the equator they happen closer to the winter solstice.

Observers at high latitudes (but less than 70.4°) will see a noticeably smaller angular diameter for Phobos because they are considerably farther away from it than observers at Mars's equator. As a result, transits of Phobos for such observers will cover less of the Sun's disk. Because it orbits so close to Mars, Phobos cannot be seen north of 70.4°N or south of 70.4°S; observers at such latitudes will obviously not see transits, either.

Mars Rover Opportunity rover (MER-B) had photographed some transits of Phobos on 7, 10 and 12 March 2004. In the captions as seen below, the first row shows Earth time UTC, and the second row shows Martian local solar time.

7 March 2004 transit – Opportunity
02:46:23; 08:16:41

02:46:33; 08:16:51

10 March 2004 transit – Opportunity
07:36:28; 11:04:23

07:36:38; 11:04:32

07:36:48; 11:04:42

12 March 2004 transit – Opportunity
13:40:47; 15:42:35

13:40:57; 15:42:44

13:41:07; 15:42:54

13:41:17; 15:43:04

The data in the tables below is generated using JPL Horizons. There is some small discrepancy with the times reported for the series of images above. This may be due to imprecision in the ephemeris data used by JPL Horizons; also the JPL Horizons data gives local apparent solar time while the times reported above are probably some form of mean solar time (and therefore some of the discrepancy would be due to the Martian equivalent of the equation of time).

Transits of Phobos from the Mars Opportunity rover landing site
Duration Earth time (UTC)	Duration (Local solar time)	Minim. separ.	Phobos ang. diam.	Sun ang. diam.	Sun alt.
prior set of transits occurred in late April 2003 – early May 2003
7 March 2004 (02:46:25 – 02:46:54)	08 18 32 – 08 19 00	671"	779.2"	1230.7"	34.6°
8 March 2004 (01:39:58 – 01:40:31)	06 35 36 – 06 36 08	517"	665.0"	1229.8"	8.9°
10 March 2004 (07:36:33 – 07:37:07)	11 06 16 – 11 06 49	114"	908.4"	1227.6"	76.3°
11 March 2004 (14:47:15 – 14:47:53)	17 27 19 – 17 27 56	193"	669.4"	1226.3"	8.0°
12 March 2004 (13:41:02 – 13:41:38)	15 44 38 – 15 45 13	64"	784.5"	1225.5"	33.7°
13 March 2004 (12:30:00 – 12:30:28)	13 57 16 – 13 57 42	625"	880.4"	1224.6"	60.4°
next set of transits occurred in the second half of March 2005

March 5, 2024: NASA released images of transits of the moon Deimos, the moon Phobos and the planet Mercury as viewed by the Perseverance rover on the planet Mars.

Transits viewed from Mars by the Perseverance rover

Transit of Deimos
(January 19, 2024)

Transit of Phobos
(February 8, 2024)

Transit of Mercury
(October 28, 2023)

== Images of the shadow ==
Viewed from orbit, the penumbral shadow of Phobos can be seen to move rapidly over the Martian surface. This shadow on the Martian surface has been photographed on many occasions by Mars Global Surveyor.

=== Viking 1 ===
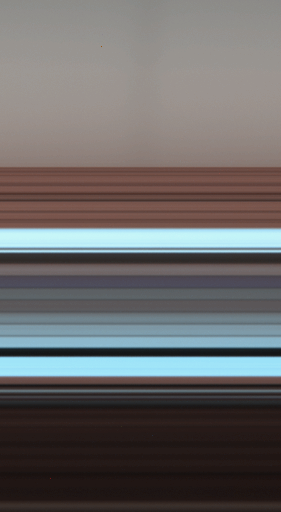
A repeated line scan image by the Viking 1 Lander detects Phobos' shadow. The brownish stripes in the middle represent the martian surface visible above the spacecraft.

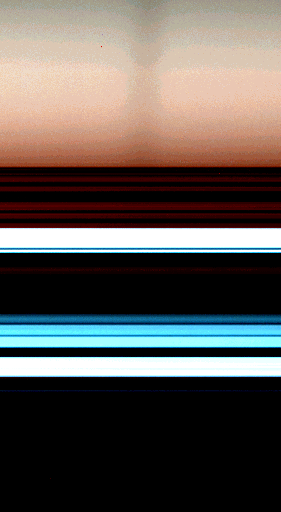
The colors are distorted to enhance the visibility of the shadow. The blue and white horizontal stripes correspond to test chart patches on the spacecraft.

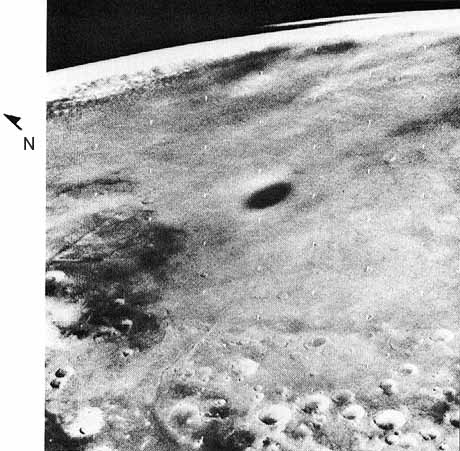
The Viking 1 Orbiter images Phobos' shadow a few kilometers directly north of the Viking 1 Lander.

In the 1970s, the Viking 1 Lander and Orbiter photographed the shadow as well. The Lander detected the penumbral shadow of Phobos passing across it. This was detected only as a slight dimming of the ambient light; the Viking 1 Lander camera did not image the Sun. The shadow took about 20 seconds to pass over the Lander, moving at about 2 km/s. The shadow was simultaneously imaged from the Viking 1 Orbiter, which permitted locating the position of the lander in the orbiter pictures.

=== 26 August 1999 image ===
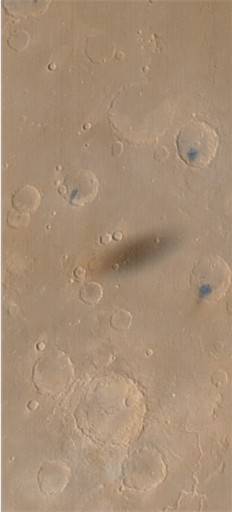
The penumbral shadow of Phobos on the Martian landscape, as seen by Mars Global Surveyor on 26 August 1999. The center of the shadow was at 10.9°N 49.2°W at 04:00:33 UTC

Far more detailed images of the shadow were taken with the arrival in 1997 of the Mars Global Surveyor and its high-resolution Mars Orbital Camera. One such image was taken on 26 August 1999 and shows the shadow at high resolution. This image was featured in a 1 November 1999 NASA press release.

By examining maps of Mars we see the shadow is centered at around 10.9°N 49.2°W.

We can also look up the original image files at M04-03241 (red) and M04-03242 (blue), part of the gallery of MOC Wide-Angle Images, Region Lunae Palus, Subphase M04. The "image start time" was 03:26:13.01 UTC, the "line integration time" is 80.4800 milliseconds, and the "downtrack summing" factor is 4. Since the shadow is centered at 6400 pixels from the bottom of the original 10800-pixel-high image (Mars Global Surveyor had a south-to-north Sun-synchronous orbit), we add (6400 × 0.08048 × 4) = 2060.3 seconds = 34 minutes 20.3 seconds to get a time of 04:00:33.3 UTC for the center of the shadow. Putting in the longitude/latitude/altitude coordinate values -310.8,10.9,0 into JPL Horizons we see that the predicted time of mid-transit was 04:00:36 UTC, in perfect agreement within the error of determining the exact longitude and latitude of the center of the shadow. This was about 14:41 Martian local solar time, and the Sun's altitude was 46.5° above the horizon. JPL Horizons also shows that on 26 August 1999 the distance between the Earth and Mars was 9.6 light-minutes.

=== Other images ===
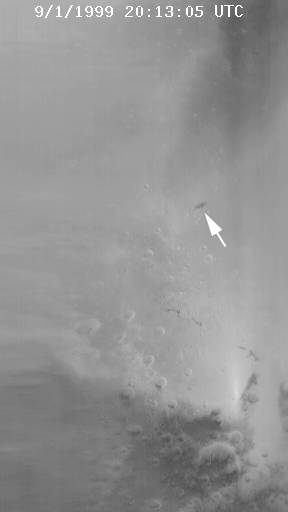
The penumbral shadow of Phobos on Mars on 1 September 1999 as imaged by Mars Global Surveyor. The center of the shadow was at 14°N 236°W at 20:49:02.4 UTC. The text label of "20:13:05" represents the image start time.

Many dozens of other images of the shadow exist, but these are much lower resolution (by a factor of 27/4). Three such images are shown in the 1 November 1999 NASA press release.

The timestamps printed on the photos in the NASA press release do not correspond to the actual time that the shadow was imaged, rather they represent the "image start time" of a vertically much larger original image. Mars Global Surveyor orbits Mars in a Sun-synchronous polar orbit with orbital period 117.65 minutes, moving from south pole to north pole, and continuously points its camera straight down. The result is an image in the form of a very long thin vertical strip, where the pixels in the top part of the image are imaged nearly one hour after those in the bottom part of the image. In principle the image could be as much as 43200 pixels high, but "downtrack summing" is used to merge adjacent lines. For instance, a downtrack summing factor of 27 causes every 27 lines to be merged into one, resulting in an image 1600 pixels high. Thus to determine the actual time that the Phobos shadow was imaged, it is necessary to locate the original image and measure how many pixels from the bottom of the image the shadow is found and add the corresponding offset to the image start time.

For example, we examine the image labeled with the timestamp 1 September 1999 20:13:05 (UTC). We have the original images M07-00166 (red) and M07-00167 (blue), part of the gallery of MOC Global-Map Images, Subphase M07. The shadow is situated at roughly 14°N 236°W.

In this case the image start time is 20:13:04.69 UTC, the line integration time is 80.48 milliseconds, and the downtrack summing factor is 27. The shadow is about 8 pixels high, centered at 993 pixels from the bottom of the original 1600-pixel-high image. We add (993 × 0.08048 × 27) = 2157.75 seconds = 35 minutes 57.75 seconds to get a time of 20:49:02.4 UTC for the center of the shadow.

Putting in the longitude/latitude/altitude coordinate values -124,14,0 into JPL Horizons gives an expected time of 20:49 for the transit, which is in good agreement once again. On 1 September 1999 the distance between the Earth and Mars was 9.9 light-minutes.

== Other observations ==
Transits of Phobos in 2019 were detected as a transient drop in the solar array current data of the InSight lander. At the time, the data were only acquired at 30s intervals, and so the events were only recorded as single-sample dips of a few to a few tens of per cent.

During the transits of spring 2020, all instruments onboard InSight recorded with full sampling rate and a slight tilt of the ultra-sensitive seismometer was observed, as well as a drop in solar irradiation and a 2 K drop in surface temperature. The tilt of the seismometer was caused from contraction of the ground due to the temperature drop; everywhere but in the shadow the thermal shielding around the seismometer.

== See also ==
- Astronomy on Mars
- List of missions to the Moons of Mars
- Solar eclipses on Mars
- Transit of Deimos from Mars
- Transit of Earth from Mars
- Transit of Mercury from Mars
