= Astronomy on Mercury =

Sky from planet Mercury

Astronomy on Mercury is the sky as viewed from the planet Mercury. Because Mercury only has a thin atmosphere, the sky will be black.

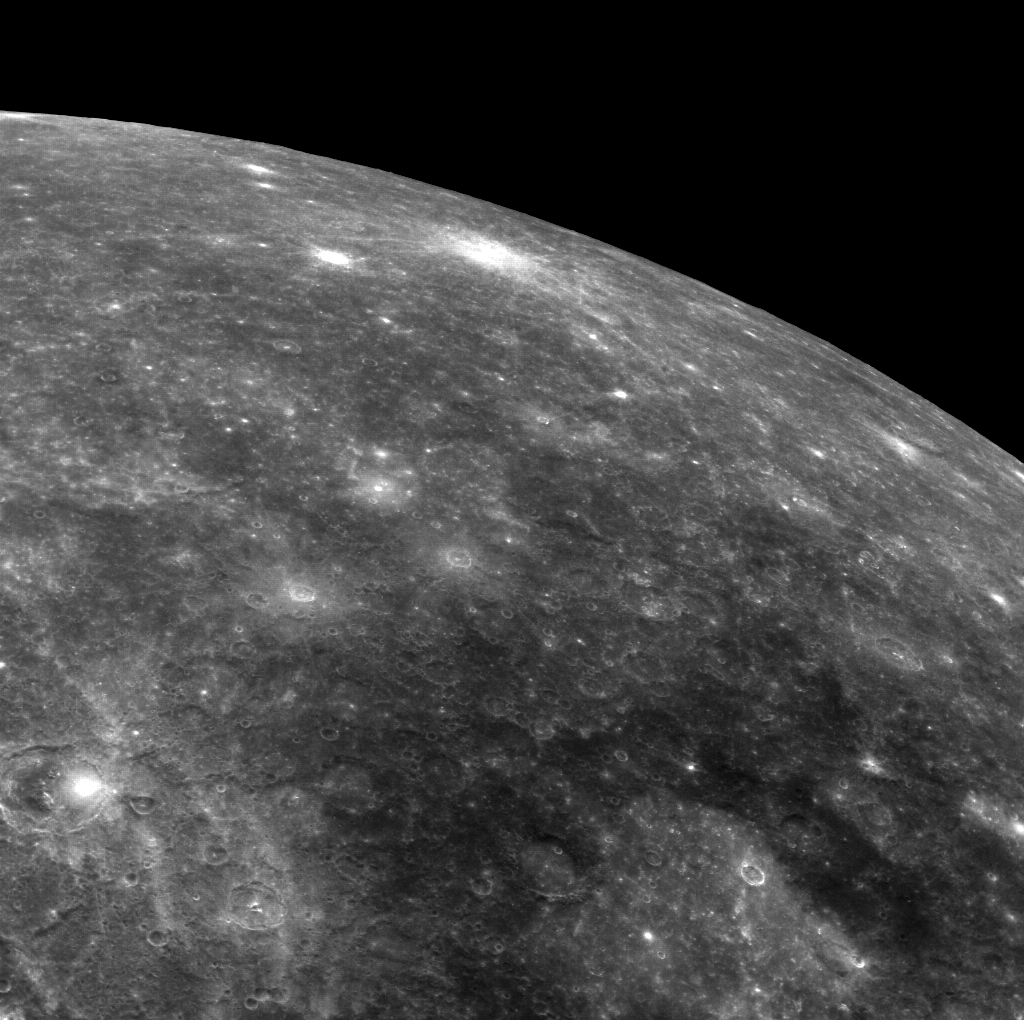
Mercury – sky viewed from orbit

== Sun ==
Due to the proximity of Mercury to the Sun, Mercury on average receives an energy flux from the Sun that is about 7 times the solar constant, but may reach nearly 11 times at maximum and about 4.5 times at minimum. The Sun will have an angular diameter of 1.733 to 1.142°. From perihelion to aphelion, the size of the Sun increases almost 66%, as does the brightness. This is due to the high eccentricity of Mercury's orbit around the Sun.

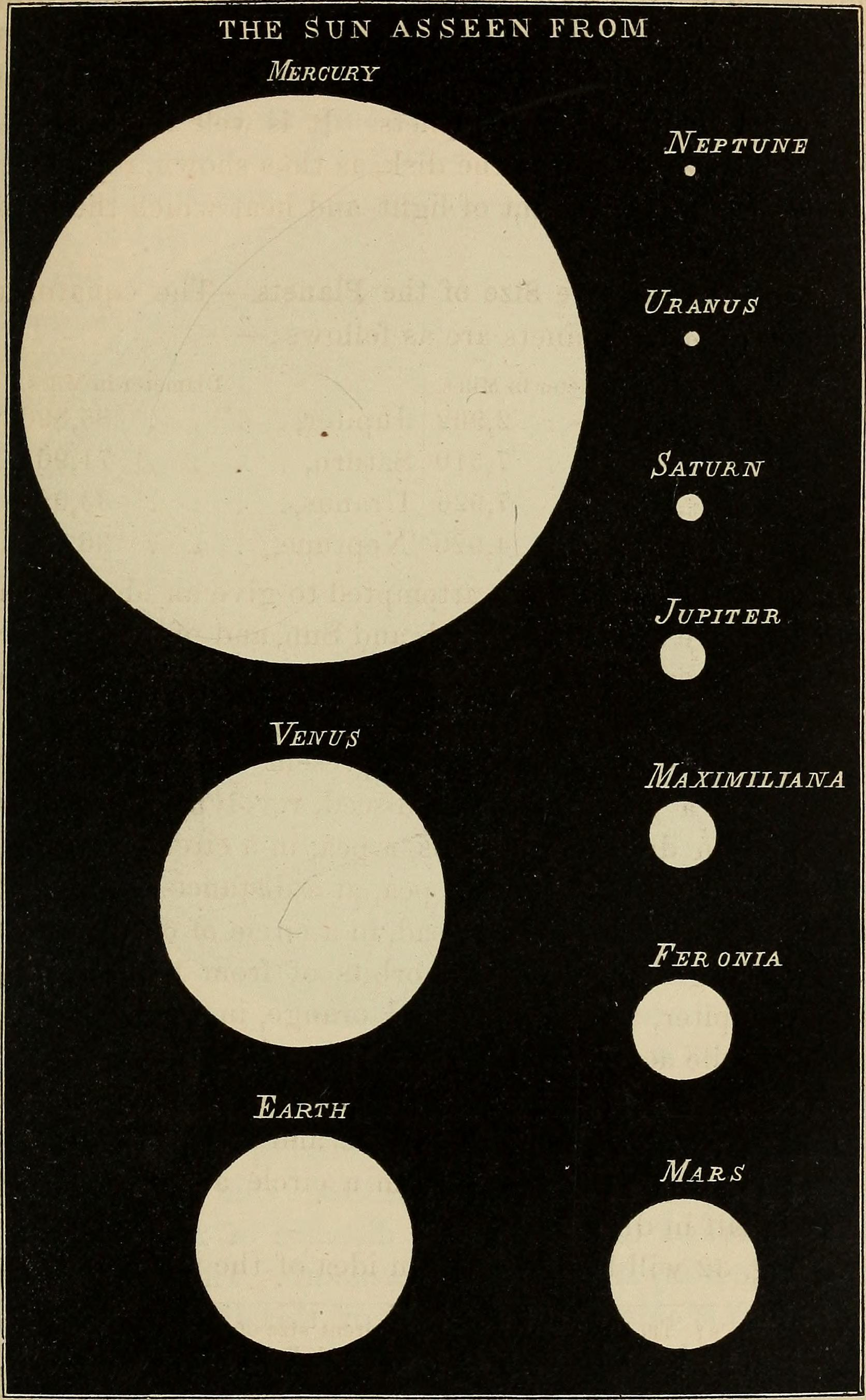
A 19th century depiction of the apparent size of the Sun as seen from the Solar System's planets (incl. 72 Feronia and the then most outlying known asteroid, here called Maximiliana and now called 65 Cybele).

Due to tidal locking, three rotations of Mercury, is equal to two revolutions around the Sun. Because of this, the method of plotting the Sun's position at the same time each day would yield only a single point. However, the equation of time can still be calculated for any time of the year, so an analemma can be graphed with this information. The resulting curve is a nearly straight east–west line.

During a Mercurian day, the Sun would be seen rising in the east, move up for a while, stop in the sky, head backwards for a while, and then resume going forwards again. This peculiar movement is due to the orbit of Mercury. If the retrograde motion happens within few hours from sunrise, an observer would see two sunsets and two sunrises, in the same day. The Sun would be seen rising, stopping midway, going back down and setting, rise again, and continue its normal journey. Approximately four (Earth) days before perihelion, the angular speed of Mercury's orbit exactly matches its rotational velocity, so that the Sun's apparent motion stops. At perihelion, Mercury's orbital angular velocity slightly exceeds the rotational velocity, making the Sun appear to go retrograde. Four days after perihelion, the Sun's normal apparent motion resumes. From the moment the top of the Sun can be seen to the moment someone can see a full circle, a sunrise would take almost 6 hours.

== Planets and Stars ==
Apart from the Sun, Venus would be the brightest celestial body. Venus will be brighter from Mercury, than from Earth. The reason for this is that when Venus is closest to Earth, it is between the Earth and the Sun, so only its night side is seen. Even when Venus is brightest in the Earth's sky, humans see only a narrow crescent. For a Mercurian observer, on the other hand, Venus is closest when it is in opposition to the Sun and is showing its full disk. The apparent magnitude of Venus is as bright as −7.987.

A lunar eclipse as viewed from Mercury, captured from the MESSENGER spacecraft. The Moon can be seen falling into the shadow of Earth.

The Earth and the Moon also will be very bright, their apparent magnitudes being about −5 and −1.2, respectively. The maximum apparent distance between the Earth and the Moon is about 15′. Which means that an observer on Mercury could differentiate between Earth and Moon as two separate dots in the sky. The Moon will come closer and closer towards Earth, eventually transiting Earth and moving over to the other side. This movement is because of the revolution of Moon around Earth. It is also possible to observe the Moon undergoing a total lunar eclipse which the MESSENGER spacecraft in orbit around Mercury did for the October 8, 2014 lunar eclipse. All other planets are visible just as they are on Earth, but somewhat less bright at opposition with the difference being most considerable for Mars.

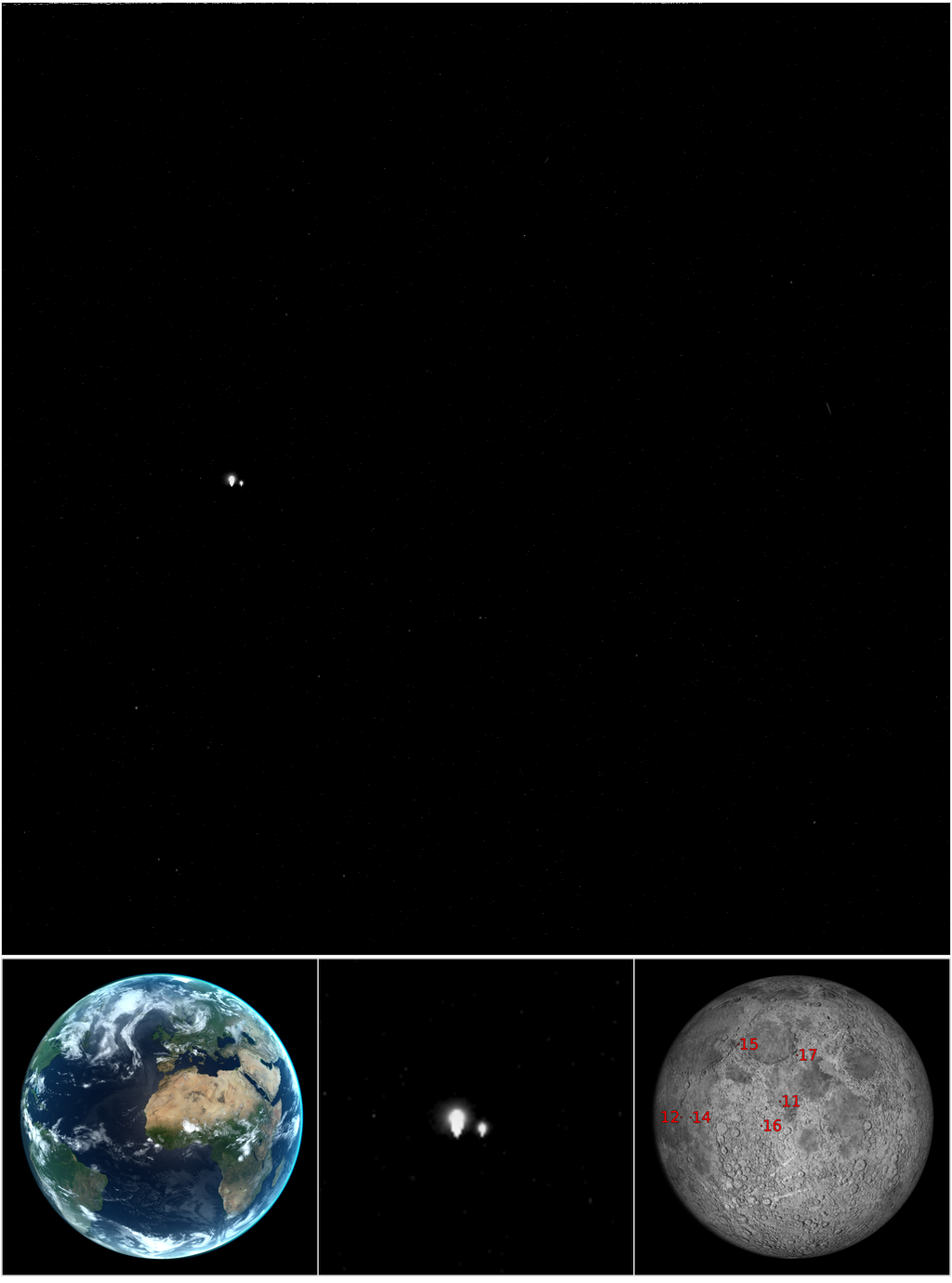
Overexposed picture Moon and Earth as seen from Mercury. Taken by the MESSENGER spaceprobe. Down below are Computer Generated images of what Earth and the Moon might have looked like. Apollo program landing sites are marked. Pluto is also in the field but is too dim to be seen.

The zodiacal light will be more prominent than it is from Earth. Mercury has a southern pole star, α Pictoris, a magnitude 3.2 star. It is fainter than Earth's Polaris. Omicron Draconis is its north star. Furthermore, the Sun is so bright that it is still impossible to see stars during the daytime, unless the observer is well shielded from sunlight (direct or reflected from the ground).

Mercury's nights are so long, and its years so short, that many stars rise or set twice each night. On Earth (outside the polar regions), only about half of the celestial sphere transits overhead during an average night, and the prominent constellations vary throughout the year, though on any given date they appear at roughly the same local time for any longitude. On Mercury, with its 3:2 spin-orbit lock (3 sidereal days = 2 years = 1 solar day/night cycle), every night lasts a year, which is 1.5 sidereal days; hence all of the stars culminate every night, and half of them twice. This 540° of nightly progression plus the ≈180° of sky arc already in view at sunset (assuming a low horizon) makes nearly two full circles; thus, nearly all of the stars come into view twice per night! But, unlike on Earth, the local time of their appearance depends markedly on the observer’s longitude. For a fixed location (and apart from some very slow processes), the star show is the same every night.

=== Solar System portrait ===
On February 18, 2011, a portrait of the Solar System was published on the MESSENGER website. The mosaic contained 34 images, acquired by the MDIS instrument during November 2010. All the planets were visible with the exception of Uranus and Neptune, due to their vast distances from the Sun. The MESSENGER "family portrait" was intended to be complementary to the Voyager family portrait, which was acquired from the outer Solar System by Voyager 1 on February 14, 1990.

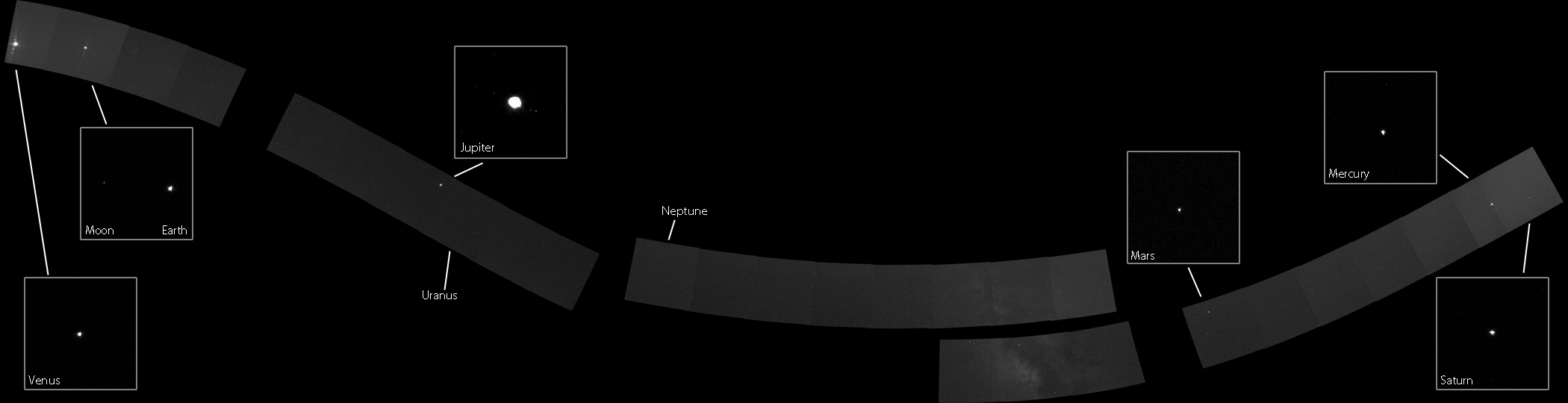
MESSENGER captured a near-complete portrait of the Solar System during November 2010.

== See also ==
- Extraterrestrial skies
- Astronomy on Mars
