= Transit of Deimos from Mars =

Transit of a moon of Mars

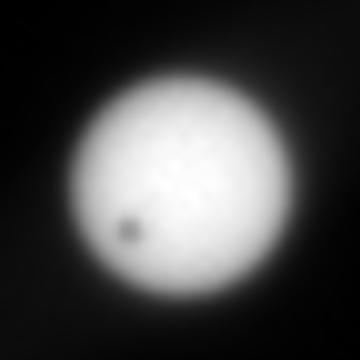
Deimos transits the Sun, as viewed by the Mars Opportunity rover on 4 March 2004.

Deimos transit on 20 January 2024, as captured by the Mars rover Perseverance on sol 1037 of its mission.

A transit of Deimos across the Sun as seen from Mars occurs when Deimos passes directly between the Sun and a point on the surface of Mars, obscuring a small part of the Sun's disc for an observer on Mars. During a transit, Deimos can be seen from Mars as a small dark spot rapidly moving across the Sun's face.

The event could also be referred to as a partial eclipse of the Sun by Deimos. However, since the angular diameter of Deimos is only about 1/10 of the angular diameter of the Sun as seen from Mars, it is more natural to refer to it as a transit. The angular diameter of Deimos is only 2½ times the angular diameter of Venus as seen from Earth during a transit of Venus from Earth.

== Transit ==
A transit of Deimos from Mars lasts a maximum of about two minutes, due to its relatively rapid orbital period of about 30.3 hours.

Because they orbit Mars in low-inclination equatorial orbits, the shadows of Phobos or Deimos projected onto the surface of Mars exhibit a seasonal variation in latitude. At any given geographical location on the surface of Mars, there are two intervals in a Martian year when the shadows of Phobos or Deimos are passing through its latitude. During each such interval, no or one transit of Deimos can be seen by observers at that geographical location (compared to about half a dozen transits of Phobos).

The shadow always falls on the "winter hemisphere", except when it crosses the equator during the March and September equinoxes. Thus transits of Deimos happen during Martian autumn and winter in the northern hemisphere and the southern hemisphere, roughly symmetrically around the winter solstice. Close to the equator they happen around the March and September equinoxes; farther from the equator they happen closer to the winter solstice.

Because it orbits relatively close to Mars, Deimos cannot be seen north of 82.7°N or south of 82.7°S; such latitudes will obviously not see transits either.

On 4 March 2004, a transit was photographed by Mars Rover Opportunity, while on 13 March 2004, a transit was photographed by Mars Rover Spirit. In the captions below, the first row shows Earth time UTC and the second row shows Martian local solar time.

4 March 2004 transit – Opportunity
03:03:43; 10:28:17

03:03:53; 10:28:27

03:04:03; 10:28:36

03:04:13; 10:28:46

13 March 2004 transit – Spirit
00:04:27; 13:54:11

00:04:37; 13:54:20

00:04:47; 13:54:30

00:04:57; 13:54:40

00:05:07; 13:54:50

00:05:17; 13:54:59

00:05:27; 13:55:09

00:05:37; 13:55:19

9 March 2005 transit – Spirit
15:58:19

15:58:29

15:58:39

15:58:49

15:58:59

15:59:09

15:59:19

15:59:29

15:59:39

15:59:49

15:59:59

The data in the tables below is generated using JPL Horizons. There is some discrepancy of a minute or two with the times reported for the series of images above. This may be due to imprecision in the ephemeris data used by JPL Horizons; also the JPL Horizons data gives local apparent solar time while the times reported above are probably some form of mean solar time (and therefore some of the discrepancy would be due to the Martian equivalent of the equation of time).

Note: the data below is valid for the original landing sites. To the extent that the rovers have moved around on the surface, the parameters of the transits as actually observed may be slightly different.

Near misses are in italics.

Transits of Deimos from the Mars Spirit rover landing site
| Duration Earth time (UTC) | Duration (Local Solar time) | Minim. separ. | Deimos ang. diam. | Sun ang. diam. | Sun alt. |
|---|---|---|---|---|---|
| 24 April 2003; 03:05:36 | 10 12 59 | 888.8" | 151.0" | 1296.4" | 58.3° |
| 25 April 2003 (10:22:29 – 10:24:25) | 16 39 46 – 16 41 39 | 248.4" | 139.6" | 1297.8" | 18.5° |
| 13 March 2004 (00:05:06 – 00:06:35) | 13 56 12 – 13 57 39 | 458.6" | 150.6" | 1225.0" | 56.8° |
| 9 March 2005 (15:54:16 – 15:56:14) | 14 49 07 – 14 51 02 | 261.4" | 147.6" | 1294.5" | 44.3° |
| 26 January 2006; 05:28:45 | 11 57 05 | 1509.5" | 153.4" | 1227.9" | 74.0° |
| 22 January 2007; 21:19:39 | 12 52 10 | 982.8" | 152.6" | 1291.6" | 67.8° |
| 12 December 2007; 18:10:49 | 16 26 33 | 850.0" | 140.9" | 1229.2" | 22.3° |

Transits of Deimos from the Mars Opportunity rover landing site
| Duration Earth time (UTC) | Duration (Local Solar time) | Minim. separ. | Deimos ang. diam. | Sun ang. diam. | Sun alt. |
|---|---|---|---|---|---|
| 30 May 2003 (00:06:57 – 00:09:04) | 13 28 59 – 13 31 02 | 95.8" | 152.5" | 1306.3" | 67.3° |
| 4 March 2004 (03:03:52 – 03:05:06) | 10 30 14 – 10 31 25 | 550.0" | 152.6" | 1233.6" | 67.6° |
| 5 March 2004; 10:21:52 | 16 58 21 | 1041.5" | 138.6" | 1232.3" | 15.4° |
| 17 March 2005; 05:28:44 | 11 28 40 | 1041.8" | 154.0" | 1303.0" | 81.6° |
| 18 March 2005 (12:36:42 – 12:38:43) | 17 46 46 – 17 48 43 | 89.6" | 134.3" | 1304.4" | 3.0° |
| 18 January 2006 (15:54:26 – 15:56:21) | 15 08 00 – 15 09 52 | 198.4" | 147.2" | 1235.3" | 42.7° |
| 31 January 2007; 18:15:01 | 16 02 28 | 824.8" | 143.2" | 1301.4" | 29.3° |
| 3 December 2007; 21:20:36 | 13 11 25 | 739.0" | 153.1" | 1238.0" | 72.1° |

March 5, 2024: NASA released images of transits of the moon Deimos, the moon Phobos and the planet Mercury as viewed by the Perseverance rover on the planet Mars.

Transits viewed from Mars by the Perseverance rover

Transit of Deimos
(January 19, 2024)

Transit of Phobos
(February 8, 2024)

Transit of Mercury
(October 28, 2023)

== Observation by InSight ==
A transit light curve of Deimos was obtained in 2020 using the solar array currents measured by the InSight lander. The light drop was about 0.9% (possibly less than the predicted geometric obstruction of 1% due to light scattering by atmospheric dust outside the shadow). The transit lasted between 116 and 124 seconds.

== See also ==
- Astronomy on Mars
- List of missions to the Moons of Mars
- Solar eclipses on Mars
- Transit of Earth from Mars
- Transit of Mercury from Mars
- Transit of Phobos from Mars
