= Transit of Earth from Mars =

Event when Earth transits the Sun from Mars

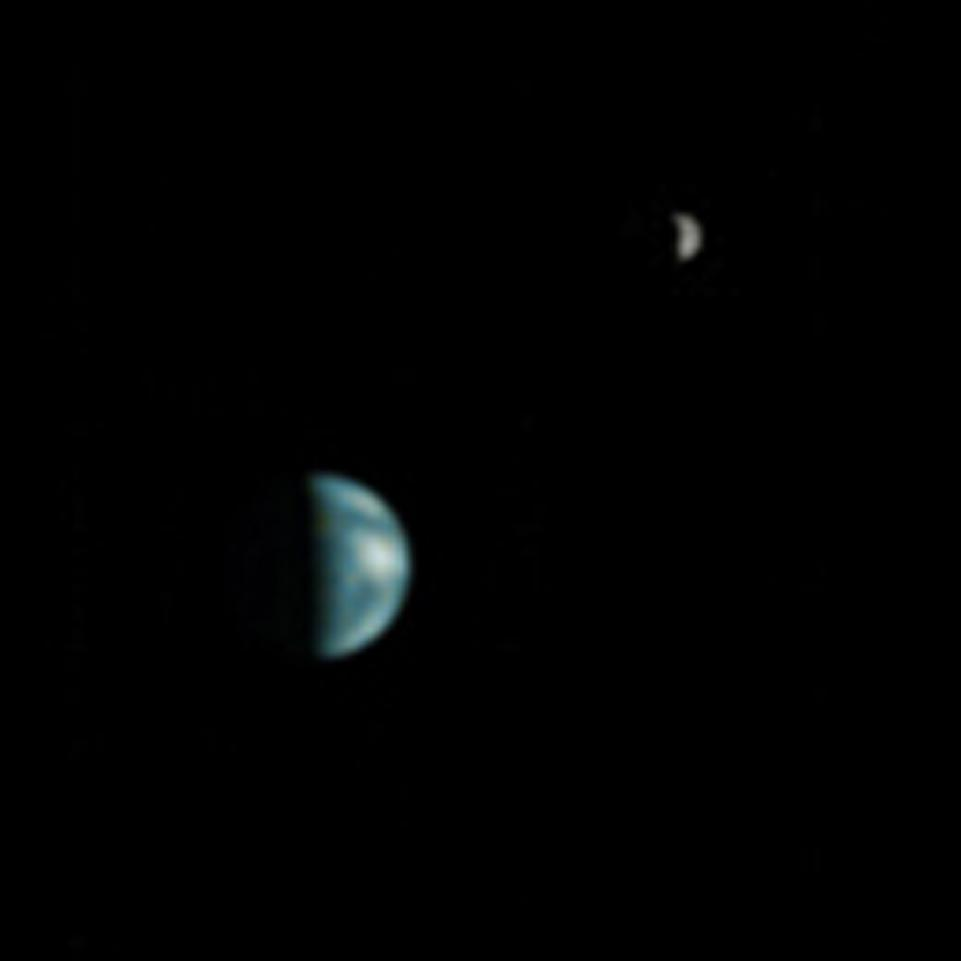
Earth and Moon from Mars, as photographed by the Mars Global Surveyor

A transit of Earth across the Sun as seen from Mars takes place when the planet Earth passes directly between the Sun and Mars, obscuring a small part of the Sun's disc for an observer on Mars. During a transit, Earth would be visible from Mars as a small black disc moving across the face of the Sun. They occur every 26, 79 and 100 years, and every ~1,000 years, there is an extra 53rd-year transit.

== Conjunctions ==
Transits of Earth from Mars usually occur in pairs, with one following the other after 79 years; rarely, there are three in the series. The transits also follow a 284-year cycle, occurring at intervals of 100.5, 79, 25.5, and 79 years; a transit falling on a particular date is usually followed by another transit 284 years later. Transits occurring when Mars is at its ascending node take place in May, those at descending node happen in November. This cycle corresponds fairly closely to 151 Mars orbits, 284 Earth orbits, and 133 synodic periods, and is analogous to the cycle of transits of Venus from Earth, which follows a cycle of 243 years (121.5, 8, 105.5, 8). There are currently four such active series, containing from 8 to 25 transits. A new one is set to begin in 2394. The last series ending was in 1211.

== View from Mars ==
No one has ever seen a transit of Earth from Mars, but the next transit will take place on November 10, 2084. The last such transit took place on 11 May 1984.

During the event, the Moon can almost always also be seen in transit, although due to the distance between Earth and Moon, sometimes one body completes the transit before the other begins (this last occurred in the 1800 transit, and will happen again in 2394).

== View from Earth ==
A transit of Earth from Mars corresponds to Mars being perfectly uniformly illuminated at opposition from Earth, its phase being 180.0° without any defect of illumination. During the 1879 event, this permitted Charles Augustus Young to attempt a careful measurement of the oblateness (polar compression) of Mars. He obtained the value 1/219, or 0.0046. This is close to the modern value of 1/154 (many sources will cite somewhat different values, such as 1/193, because even a difference of only a couple of kilometers in the values of Mars's polar and equatorial radii gives a considerably different result).

Much more recently, better measurements of the oblateness of Mars have been made by using radar from the Earth. Also, better measurements have been made by using artificial satellites that have been put into orbit around Mars, including Mariner 9, Viking 1, Viking 2, and Soviet orbiters, and the more recent orbiters that have been sent from the Earth to Mars.

== In science fiction ==
A science fiction short story published in 1971 by Arthur C. Clarke, called "Transit of Earth", depicts a doomed astronaut on Mars observing the transit in 1984. This short story was first published in the January 1971 issue of Playboy magazine.

== Dates of transits ==
Transits of Earth from Mars (grouped by series)
November 10, 1595	May 5, 1621	May 8, 1700	November 9, 1800	
November 12, 1879	May 8, 1905	May 11, 1984	November 10, 2084	
November 15, 2163	May 10, 2189	May 13, 2268	November 13, 2368	May 10, 2394
November 17, 2447	May 13, 2473	May 16, 2552	November 15, 2652	May 13, 2678

== Grazing and simultaneous transits ==
Sometimes Earth only grazes the Sun during a transit. In this case it is possible that in some areas of Mars a full transit can be seen while in other regions there is only a partial transit (no second or third contact). The last transit of this type was on 30 April 1211, and the next such transit will occur on 27 November 4356. It is also possible that a transit of Earth can be seen in some parts of Mars as a partial transit, while in others Earth misses the Sun. Such a transit last occurred on 26 October 664, and the next transit of this type will occur on 14 December 5934.

The simultaneous occurrence of a transit of Venus and a transit of Earth is extremely rare, and will next occur in the year 571,741.

== See also ==
- Astronomical transit
- Transit of Phobos from Mars
- Transit of Deimos from Mars
- Transit of Mercury from Mars
- Transits of Mercury as seen from Mars
- Transits of Venus as seen from Mars
