= Transit of Mercury from Mars =

Movement of Mercury seen from Mars

Mercury transiting the Sun as viewed by the Mars rover Curiosity (June 3, 2014).

A transit of Mercury across the Sun as seen from Mars takes place when the planet Mercury passes directly between the Sun and Mars, obscuring a small part of the Sun's disc for an observer on Mars. During a transit, Mercury can be seen from Mars as a small black disc moving across the face of the Sun.

Transits of Mercury from Mars are roughly twice as common as transits of Mercury from Earth: there are several per decade.

== Transit ==
The Mars rovers Spirit and Opportunity could have observed the transit of January 12, 2005 (from 14:45 UTC to 23:05 UTC); however the only camera available for this had insufficient resolution. They were able to observe transits of Deimos across the Sun, but at 2' angular diameter, Deimos is about 20 times larger than Mercury's 6.1" angular diameter. Ephemeris data generated by JPL Horizons indicates that Opportunity would have been able to observe the transit from the start until local sunset at about 19:23 UTC, while Spirit could have observed it from local sunrise at about 19:38 UTC until the end of the transit. The rover Curiosity observed the Mercury transit of June 3, 2014, marking the first time any planetary transit has been observed from a celestial body besides Earth.

March 5, 2024: NASA released images of transits of the moon Deimos, the moon Phobos and the planet Mercury as viewed by the Perseverance rover on the planet Mars.

Transits viewed from Mars by the Perseverance rover

Transit of Deimos
(January 19, 2024)

Transit of Phobos
(February 8, 2024)

Transit of Mercury
(October 28, 2023)

The Mercury-Mars synodic period is 100.888 days. It can be calculated using the formula 1/(1/P-1/Q), where P is the orbital period of Mercury (87.969 days) and Q is the orbital period of Mars (686.98 days).

The inclination of Mercury's orbit with respect to that of Mars is 5.16°, which is less than its value of 7.00° with respect to Earth's ecliptic.

=== Transits 2000–2100 ===
- December 18, 2003
- January 12, 2005
- November 23, 2005
- May 10, 2013
- June 3, 2014
- April 15, 2015
- October 28, 2023
- September 5, 2024
- January 26, 2034
- February 21, 2035
- July 13, 2044
- May 24, 2045
- November 8, 2052
- December 3, 2053
- October 14, 2054
- April 25, 2063
- March 6, 2064
- July 27, 2073
- August 22, 2074
- December 17, 2082
- January 12, 2084
- November 22, 2084
- May 9, 2092
- June 3, 2093
- April 14, 2094

== Simultaneous transits ==
The simultaneous occurrence of a transit of Mercury and a transit of Venus is extremely rare, but somewhat more frequent than from Earth, and will next occur in the years 18,713, 19,536 and 20,029.
On several occasions a related event is predicted: a transit of Mercury and a transit of Venus, or transit of Earth, will follow themselves, one after the other, in an interval of only several hours.

On November 28, 3867, there will be a transit of Earth and Moon, and two days later there will be a transit of Mercury. On January 16, 18551, transits of Mercury and Venus will occur 14 hours apart.

== See also ==
- Astronomical transit
- Transit of Deimos from Mars
- Transit of Phobos from Mars
- Transit of Mercury from Earth
