= TOI-2535 b =

Exoplanet orbiting TOI-2535

Discovery
- Discovered by: Transiting Exoplanet Survey Satellite
- Discovery date: 2026
- Detection method: Transit

Orbital characteristics
- Semi-major axis: 0.0993+0.0087 −0.015 au
- Eccentricity: 0.19+0.13 −0.16
- Orbital period (sidereal): 8.2358054±0.0000079 d
- Inclination: 90.76°
- Star: TOI-2535

Physical characteristics
- Mean radius: 0.844+0.027 −0.029 R_{J}
- Mass: 0.472 M_{J}

TOI-2535 b is an exoplanet known to be the first formerly transiting exoplanet. It was detected by the Transiting Exoplanet Survey Satellite since 2019 via the transit method, but it stopped transiting its parent star, from Earth's vantage point, in 2026, due to its changing inclination.

== Orbit ==
=== Inclination variation ===
The observation of transits, both with TESS and ground telescopes confirms that, within a seven-year baseline, from 2019 to 2026, the inclination of TOI-2535 b changed so quickly that the transit chord went from below the stellar equator to grazing the star disk, until stopping transiting the star altogether. TOI-2535 b, at the time of its discovery, is the exoplanet with the largest inclination change ever observed orbiting a single star. Its precession period is measured in decades, while other fast precessing systems, such as TOI 216, have a period of ~150 years. The planet could come back in a transiting configuration in the next 30 to 50 years.

=== Transit timing variation ===
Before the transits disappeared, their timing was also highly variable, being anticipated or delayed by up to six hours, among the largest for hot Jupiters.

== Hidden companion ==
The orbital dynamics of TOI 2535 b suggests that it is in orbital resonance with another hidden giant planet in a highly mutually inclined orbit. The hidden companion could precess into a transiting configuration in the next decades.

Catalogued as TOI-2535 c, it is half the mass of Jupiter and has an orbital period of 16 days, with an orbital inclination of 78 degrees.
