= Astronomical transit =

Term in astronomy

Phobos transits the Sun, as viewed by the Perseverance rover on 2 April 2022

In astronomy, a transit (or astronomical transit) is the passage of a celestial body directly between a larger body and the observer. As viewed from a particular vantage point, the transiting body appears to move across the face of the larger body, covering a small portion of it.

The word "transit" refers to cases where the nearer object appears smaller than the more distant object. Cases where the nearer object appears larger and completely hides the more distant object are known as occultations.

However, the probability of seeing a transiting planet is low because it is dependent on the alignment of the three objects in a nearly perfectly straight line. Many parameters of a planet and its parent star can be determined based on the transit.

== In the Solar System ==
A simulation of Io transiting Jupiter as seen from the Earth in February 2009. Io's shadow is seen on the surface of Jupiter, leading Io slightly due to the Sun and Earth not being in the same line.

One type of transit involves the motion of a planet between a terrestrial observer and the Sun. This can happen only with inferior planets, namely Mercury and Venus (see transit of Mercury and transit of Venus).

Concerning the Sun and Moon seen from Earth, there is a special and unique situation: the disk of the Moon can appear smaller than the disk of the Sun, but it can also appear larger. In the first case a transit of the Moon in front of the Sun, an annular solar eclipse occurs, while in the second case the Moon occults the Sun, resulting in a total solar eclipse.

However, because a transit is dependent on the point of observation, the Earth can transit the Sun as observed from Mars. In the solar transit by the Moon captured during calibration of the STEREO B spacecraft's ultraviolet imaging, the Moon appears much smaller than it does when seen from Earth, because the spacecraft–Moon separation was several times greater than the Earth–Moon distance.

The term can also be used to describe the motion of a satellite across its parent planet, for instance one of the Galilean satellites (Io, Europa, Ganymede, Callisto) across Jupiter, as seen from Earth.

Although rare, it can happen that four bodies are all lined up. One of these events occurred on 27 June 1586, when Mercury transited the Sun as seen from Venus at the same time as a transit of Mercury from Saturn and a transit of Venus from Saturn.

=== Notable observations ===
No missions were planned to coincide with the transit of Earth visible from Mars on 11 May 1984, and the Viking missions had been terminated a year previously. Consequently, the next opportunity to observe such an alignment will be in 2084.

On 21 December 2012, the Cassini–Huygens probe, in orbit around Saturn, observed the planet Venus transiting the Sun.

On 3 June 2014, the Mars rover Curiosity observed the planet Mercury transiting the Sun, marking the first time a planetary transit has been observed from a celestial body other than Earth.

=== Mutual planetary transits ===
In rare cases, one planet can pass in front of another. If the nearer planet appears smaller than the more distant one, the event is called a mutual planetary transit.

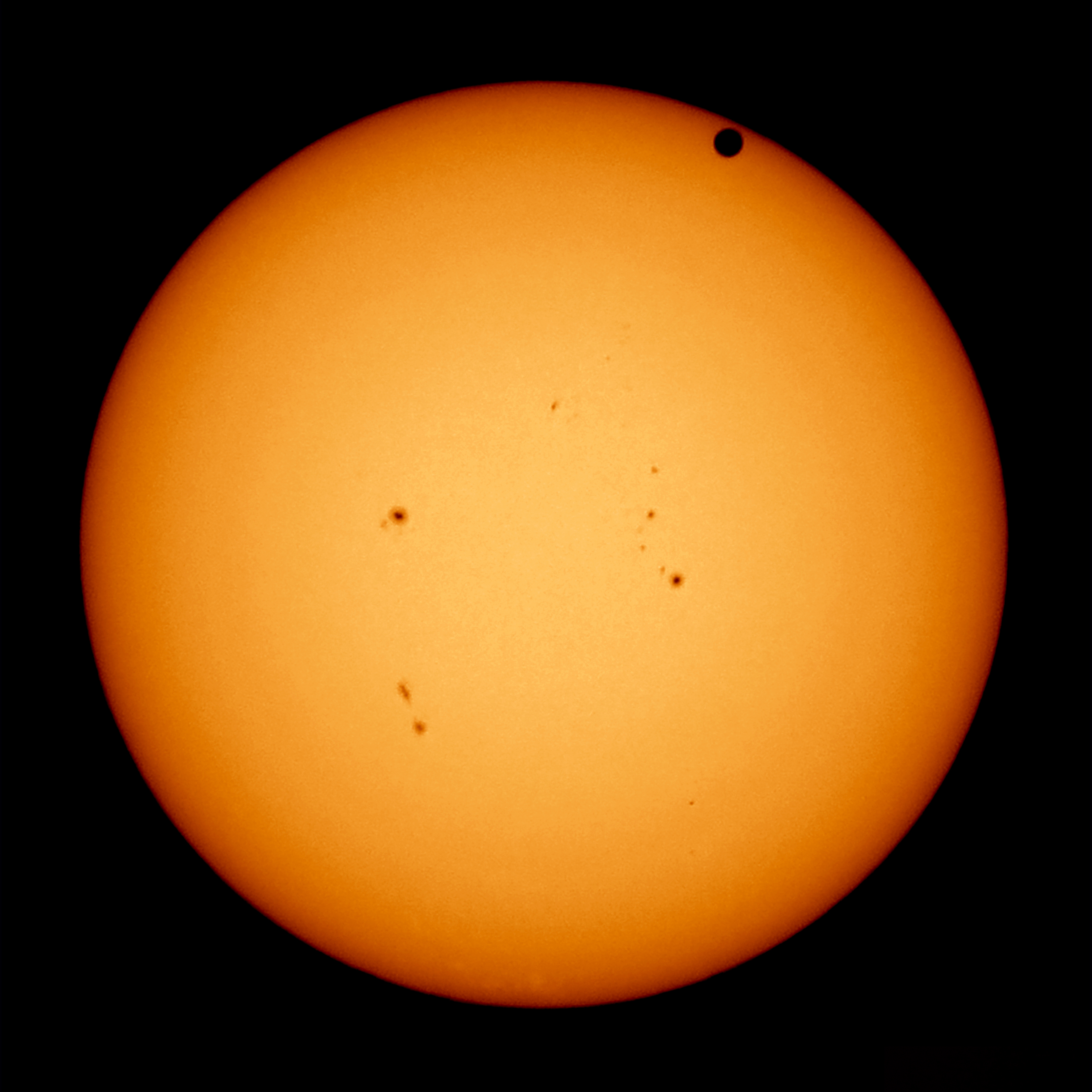
Transit of Venus as seen from Earth, 2012

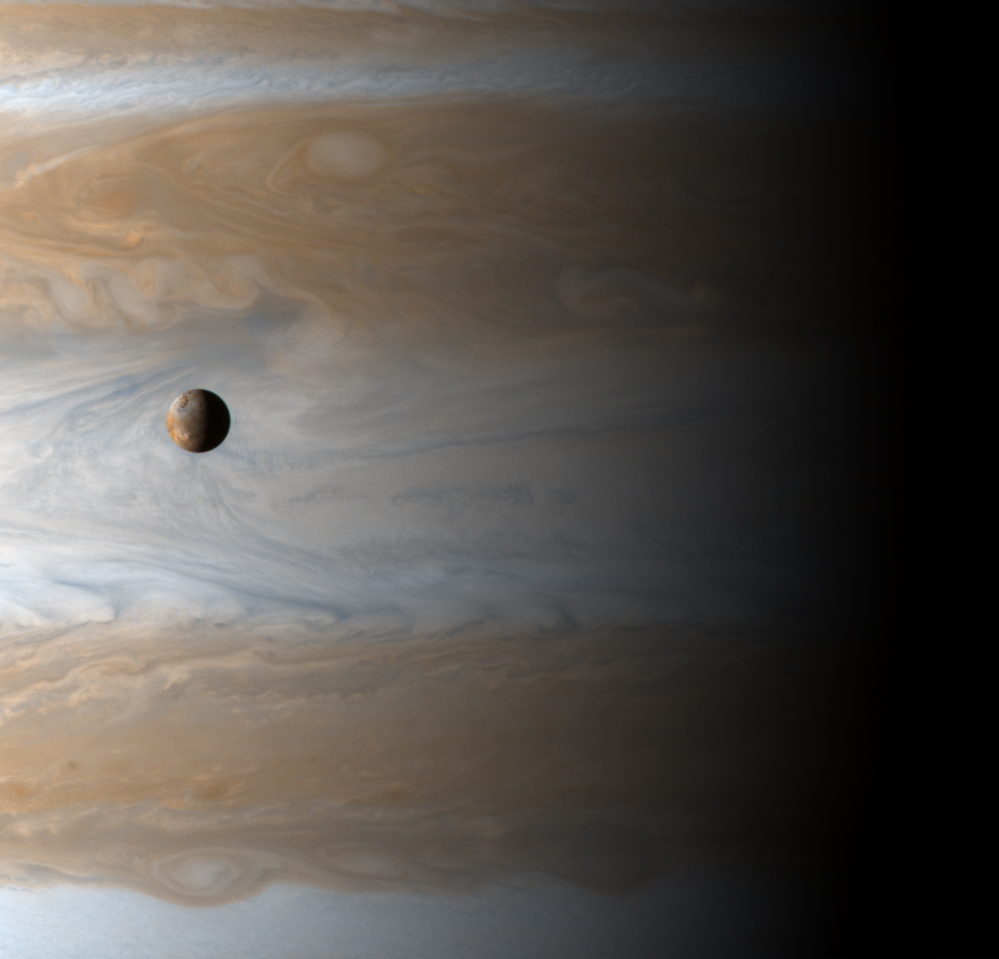
Io transits across Jupiter as seen by Cassini spacecraft

Mercury transiting the Sun, seen from Curiosity rover on Mars (3 June 2014)

The Moon transiting in front of Earth, seen by Deep Space Climate Observatory on 4 August 2015

=== Other types of transits ===
The passage of man-made objects in front of the Sun, Moon, or planets is sometimes referred to as a transit. Popular imaging targets among astrophotographers include passages of the International Space Station (ISS) in front of the Sun, the Moon, or a planet; passages of rockets in front of the Sun during launch; or transits of the Sun or Moon by artificial satellites like the Hubble Space Telescope. Transits of the Sun by aircraft or skydivers have also been photographed, including simultaneous transits of the Sun and the Moon during Solar eclipses.

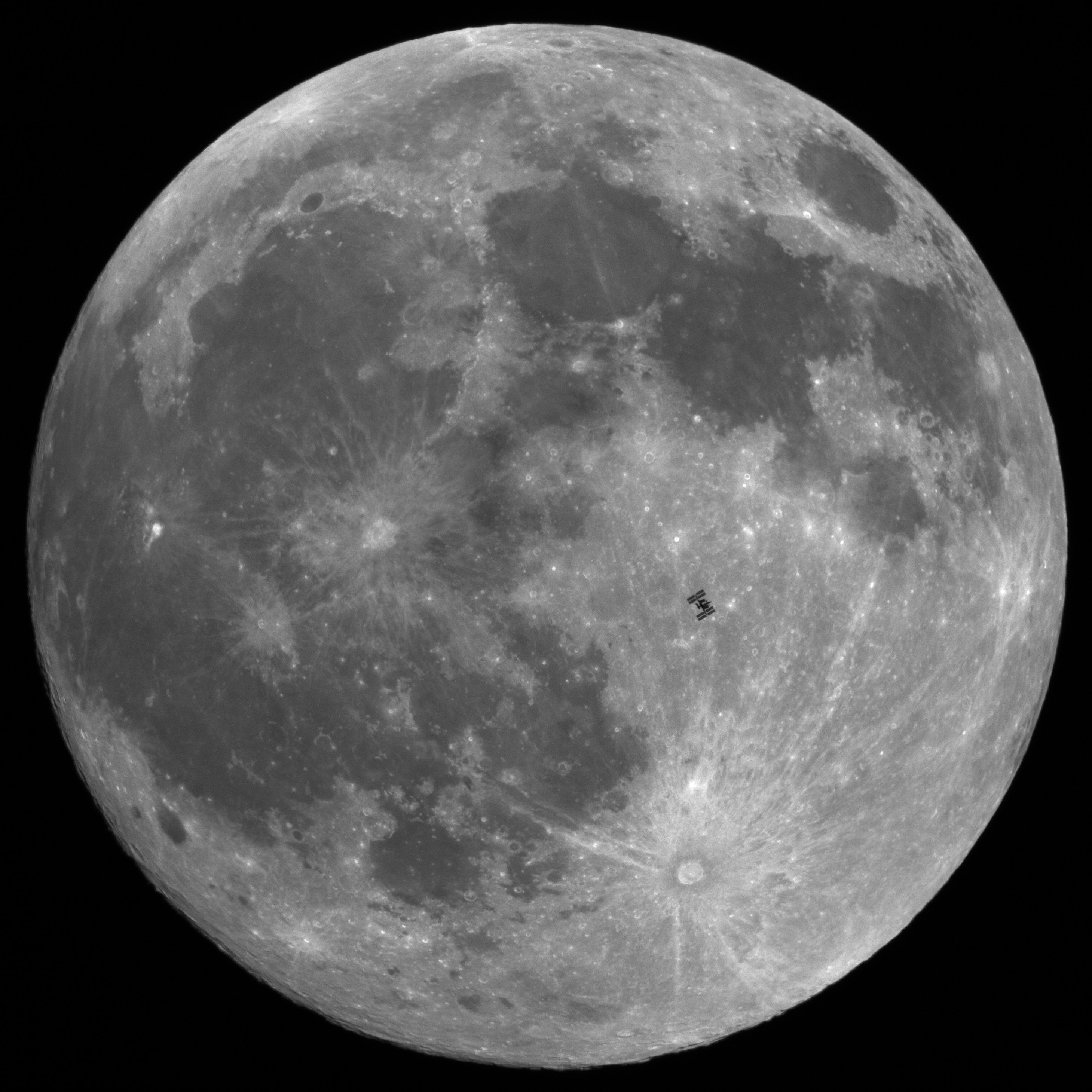
Transit of the International Space Station in front of the Moon (2013)

Slow motion footage of the ISS transiting Sun and Moon during a partial solar eclipse (2017)

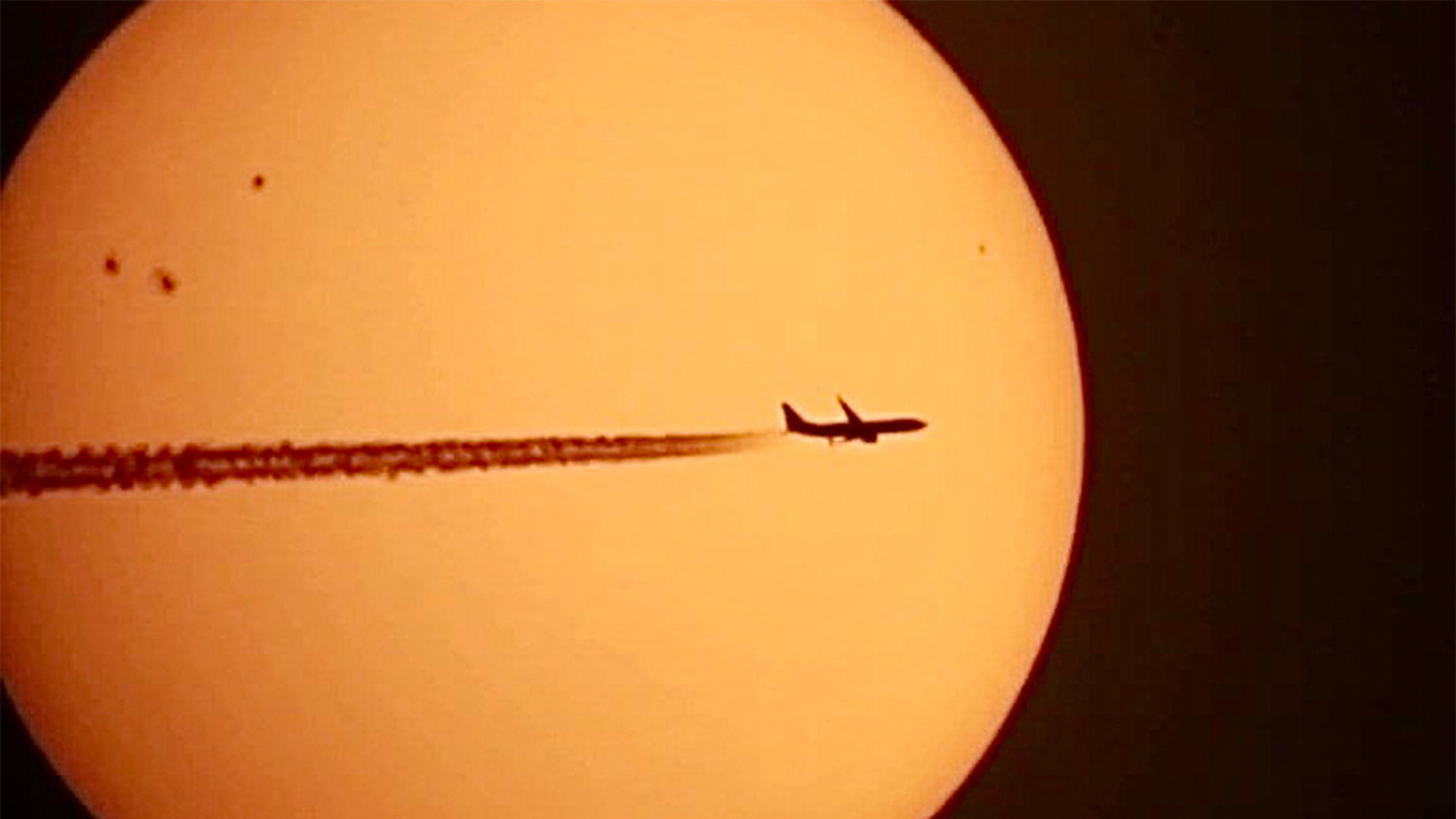
An airplane transiting the Sun, with visible sunspots (2022)

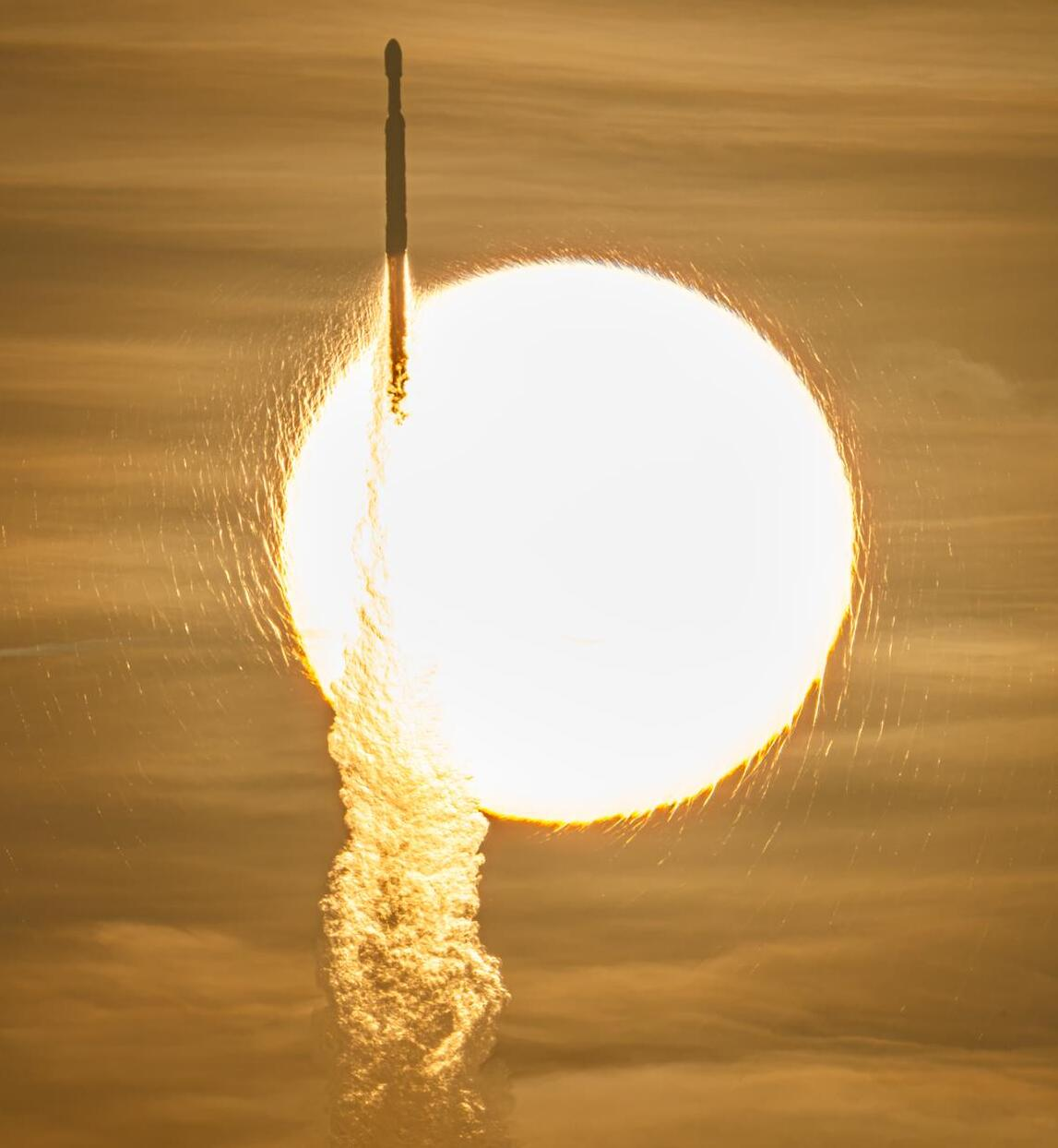
A Falcon Heavy rocket transits the Sun shortly after launch (2026)

== Outside the Solar System ==
Visualization of transit method for planets of different sizes, showing different light-curves.

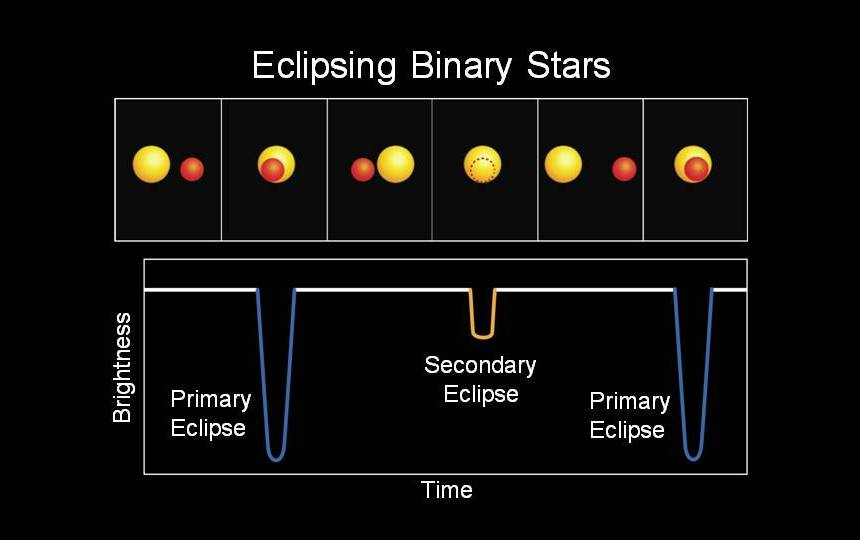
The light curve shows the change in Luminosity of star as a result of transiting. The data was collected from the Kepler mission.

The transit method can be used to discover exoplanets. As a planet eclipses/transits its host star it will block a portion of the light from the star. If the planet transits in-between the star and the observer the change in light can be measured to construct a light curve. Light curves are measured with a charge-coupled device. The light curve of a star can disclose several physical characteristics of the planet and star, such as density. Multiple transit events must be measured to determine the characteristics which tend to occur at regular intervals. Multiple planets orbiting the same host star can cause transit-timing variations (TTV). TTV is caused by the gravitational forces of all orbiting bodies acting upon each other. The probability of seeing a transit from Earth is low, however. The probability is given by the following equation.

$P_\text{transit}= (R_\text{star} + R_\text{planet})/a,$

where R_{star} and R_{planet} are the radius of the star and planet, respectively, and a is the semi-major axis of the planet's orbit. Because of the low probability of a transit in any specific system, large regions of the sky must be observed frequently in order to see a transit. Hot Jupiters are more likely to be seen because of their larger radius and short semi-major axis. In order to find Earth-sized planets, red dwarf stars are observed because of their small radius. Even though transiting has a low probability it has proven itself to be a good technique for discovering exoplanets.

In recent years, the discovery of extrasolar planets has prompted interest in the possibility of detecting their transits across their own stellar primaries. HD 209458b was the first such transiting planet to be detected.

The transit of celestial objects is one of the few key phenomena used today for the study of exoplanetary systems. Today, transit photometry is the leading form of exoplanet discovery. As an exoplanet moves in front of its host star there is a dimming in the luminosity of the host star that can be measured. Larger planets make the dip in luminosity more noticeable and easier to detect. Followup observations using other methods are often carried out to ensure it is a planet.

There are currently (July 2025) 2782 planets confirmed with Kepler light curves for stellar host.

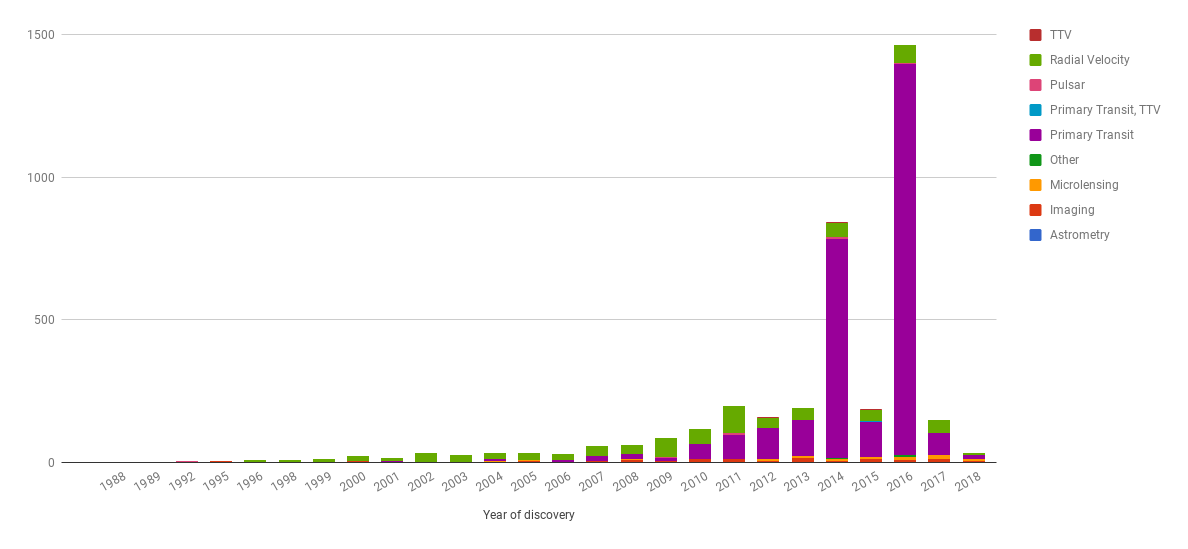
Exoplanets found by different search methods each year through 2018, transit method in purple.

If the orbital configuration changes, a formerly transiting planet can stop transiting the star from our vantage point, as it happened in 2026 with TOI-2535 b.

== Contacts ==
During a transit there are four "contacts", when the circumference of the small circle (small body disk) touches the circumference of the large circle (large body disk) at a single point. Historically, measuring the precise time of each point of contact was one of the most accurate ways to determine the positions of astronomical bodies. The contacts happen in the following order:

- First contact: the point at which the smaller body starts to encroach on the larger body, moving inward ("exterior ingress")
- Second contact: the point at which the smaller body starts to be entirely inside the larger body, moving further inward ("interior ingress")
- Third contact: the point at which the smaller body ceases to be entirely inside the larger body, moving outward ("interior egress")
- Fourth contact: the point at which the smaller body ceases to encroach on the larger body, moving outward ("exterior egress")

A fifth named point is that of greatest transit, when the apparent centers of the two bodies are nearest to each other, halfway through the transit, which will occur between the second and third contacts

== Missions ==
Since transit photometry allows for scanning large celestial areas with a simple procedure, it has been the most popular and successful form of finding exoplanets in the past decade and includes many projects, some of which have already been retired, others in use today, and some in progress of being planned and created. The most successful projects include HATNet, KELT, Kepler, and WASP, and some new and developmental stage missions such as TESS, HATPI, and others which can be found among the List of Exoplanet Search Projects.

=== HATNet ===
HATNet Project is a set of northern telescopes in Fred Lawrence Whipple Observatory, Arizona and Mauna Kea Observatories, HI, and southern telescopes around the globe, in Africa, Australia, and South America, under the HATSouth branch of the project. These are small aperture telescopes, just like KELT, and look at a wide field which allows them to scan a large area of the sky for possible transiting planets. In addition, their multitude and spread around the world allows for 24/7 observation of the sky so that more short-period transits can be caught.

A third sub-project, HATPI, is currently under construction and will survey most of the night sky seen from its location in Chile.

=== KELT ===
KELT is a terrestrial telescope mission designed to search for transiting systems of planets of magnitude 8<M<10. It began operation in October 2004 in Winer Observatory and has a southern companion telescope added in 2009. KELT North observes "26-degree wide strip of sky that is overhead from North America during the year", while KELT South observes single target areas of the size 26 by 26 degrees. Both telescopes can detect and identify transit events as small as a 1% flux dip, which allows for detection of planetary systems similar to those in our planetary system.

=== Kepler / K2 ===
The Kepler space telescope served the Kepler mission between 7 March 2009 and 11 May 2013, where it observed one part of the sky in search of transiting planets within a 115 square degrees of the sky around the constellations Cygnus, Lyra, and Draco. After that, the satellite continued operating until 15 November 2018, this time changing its field along the ecliptic to a new area roughly every 75 days due to reaction wheel failure.

=== TESS ===
TESS was launched on 18 April 2018, and is planned to survey most of the sky by observing it strips defined along the right ascension lines for 27 days each. Each area surveyed is 27 by 90 degrees. Because of the positioning of sections, the area near TESS's rotational axis will be surveyed for up to 1 year, allowing for the identification of planetary systems with longer orbital periods.

== Scientific importance ==
In the 18th and 19th centuries, planetary transits were of great importance to astronomy. Several attempts were made at great cost to use the contact times of Venus at her solar transits observed at different places to determine the mean distance to the Sun with high precision. Even though this did not work as expected because of the black drop effect, the timing of Venus transits remained the most reliable method to measure distances in the Solar System until the 20th century.

During the transit of 1761, Mikhail Lomonosov discovered the Lomonosov effect, which he correctly explained by inferring that Venus must have an atmosphere.

== See also ==
- Eclipse
- Kepler Mission
- Occultation
- Syzygy (astronomy)
  - Conjunction (astronomy)
  - Opposition (astronomy)
- Transit of asteroids
- Transit of Deimos from Mars
- Transit of Phobos from Mars
- Transit of Vulcan
- Transit of Mercury from Mars
- Transit of Earth from Mars
- Guillaume Le Gentil, French scientist who unsuccessfully tried to observe the Venus transits of 1761 and 1769
