= Solar eclipses on Mars =

When moons of Mars pass before the Sun

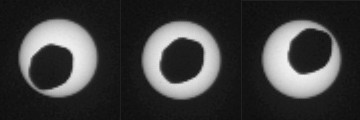
Annular eclipse of the Sun by Phobos (Curiosity, 20 August 2013)

Eclipse of the Sun by Phobos, the larger of the two moons of Mars, in real time (Curiosity, 20 August 2013)

The two moons of Mars, Phobos and Deimos, are much smaller than Earth's Moon, greatly reducing the frequency of solar eclipses on that planet. Neither moon's apparent diameter is large enough to cover the disk of the Sun, and therefore they are annular solar eclipses and can also be considered transits.

== Eclipses caused by Phobos ==
Transit of Phobos (Opportunity, March 2004)

Due to the small size of Phobos (about 20 by 25 km (12 by 16 mi)) and its rapid orbital motion, an observer on the surface of Mars would never experience a solar eclipse for longer than about thirty seconds. Phobos also takes only 7 hours 39 minutes to orbit Mars, while a Martian day is 24 hours 37 minutes long, meaning that Phobos can create two eclipses per Martian day. These are annular eclipses, because Phobos is not quite large enough or close enough to Mars to create a total solar eclipse. The highest resolution, highest frame rate video of a Phobos transit has been released from the Mastcam-Z on Perseverance rover in 2022.

== Transits caused by Deimos ==
Deimos is too small (about 15 by 10 km (9.3 by 6.2 mi)) and too far from Mars to cause an eclipse. The best an observer on Mars would see is a small spot crossing the Sun's disc.

== View from Mars ==
March 5, 2024: NASA released images of transits of the moon Deimos, the moon Phobos and the planet Mercury as viewed by the Perseverance rover on the planet Mars.

Transits viewed from Mars by the Perseverance rover

Transit of Deimos
(January 19, 2024)

Transit of Phobos
(February 8, 2024)

Transit of Mercury
(October 28, 2023)

== View from Earth ==
Both moons are too small to cast a shadow on Mars that can be seen from Earth. However, shortly after the first artificial satellites were placed in orbit around Mars, the shadow of Phobos was seen in pictures transmitted to Earth.
