= Mars Year 1 =

First year of the Martian timekeeping standard

Mars Year 1 is the first year of Martian timekeeping standard developed by Clancy et al. originally for the purposes of working with the cyclical temporal variations of meteorological phenomena of Mars, but later used for general timekeeping on Mars. Mars Years have no officially adopted month systems. Scientists generally use two sub-units of the Mars Year:

- the Solar longitude (L_{s}) system: 360 degrees per Mars Year that represent the position of Mars in its orbit around the Sun, or
- the Sol system: 668 sols per Mars Year. This system consists of uniform time units. However, Mars Year sols may be confused with rover mission times that are also expressed in sols.

Unlike in the day vs. sol distinction, "Mars Year" has no unique Latin term. Start and End dates of Mars Years were determined for 1607–2141 by Piqueux et al. Earth and Mars dates can be converted in the Mars Climate Database, however, the Mars Years are only rational to apply to events that take place on Mars.

Mars Year 1 started on 11 April 1955 and ended on 25 February 1957. Mars Year 1 is preceded by Mars Year 0.

== Events of Mars Year 1 ==
There was no spacecraft on or around Mars in Mars Year 1 (the first successful flyby occurred in Mars Year 6).

De Mottoni created two albedo maps, Kuiper made several drawings Millman made maps and detailed descriptions and Dollfus observed the poles of Mars during the 1956 opposition.

- L_{s} 257 (Sol 495) Křivský et al. reports that the polar cap disappeared during a solar flare event.
- L_{s} 263 (Sol 505): Earth is closest to Mars (10 September 1956). This was the best time to observe Mars, therefore most observations during M.Y. 1 took place during this time.
- Around L_{s} 270: Major dust storm. Kuiper observed that a new polar cap formed before the southern summer solstice (L_{s} 270), and a dust storm developed over Mare Sirenum or Hellespontus and spread rapidly, covering the entire planet with dust except the south polar region. The lowered temperature may have led to the early formation of the polar cap where bright white snow was observed uncontaminated by yellow dust, however Millman attributes the disappearance of the cap to clouds.
