= Scientific information from the Mars Exploration Rover mission =

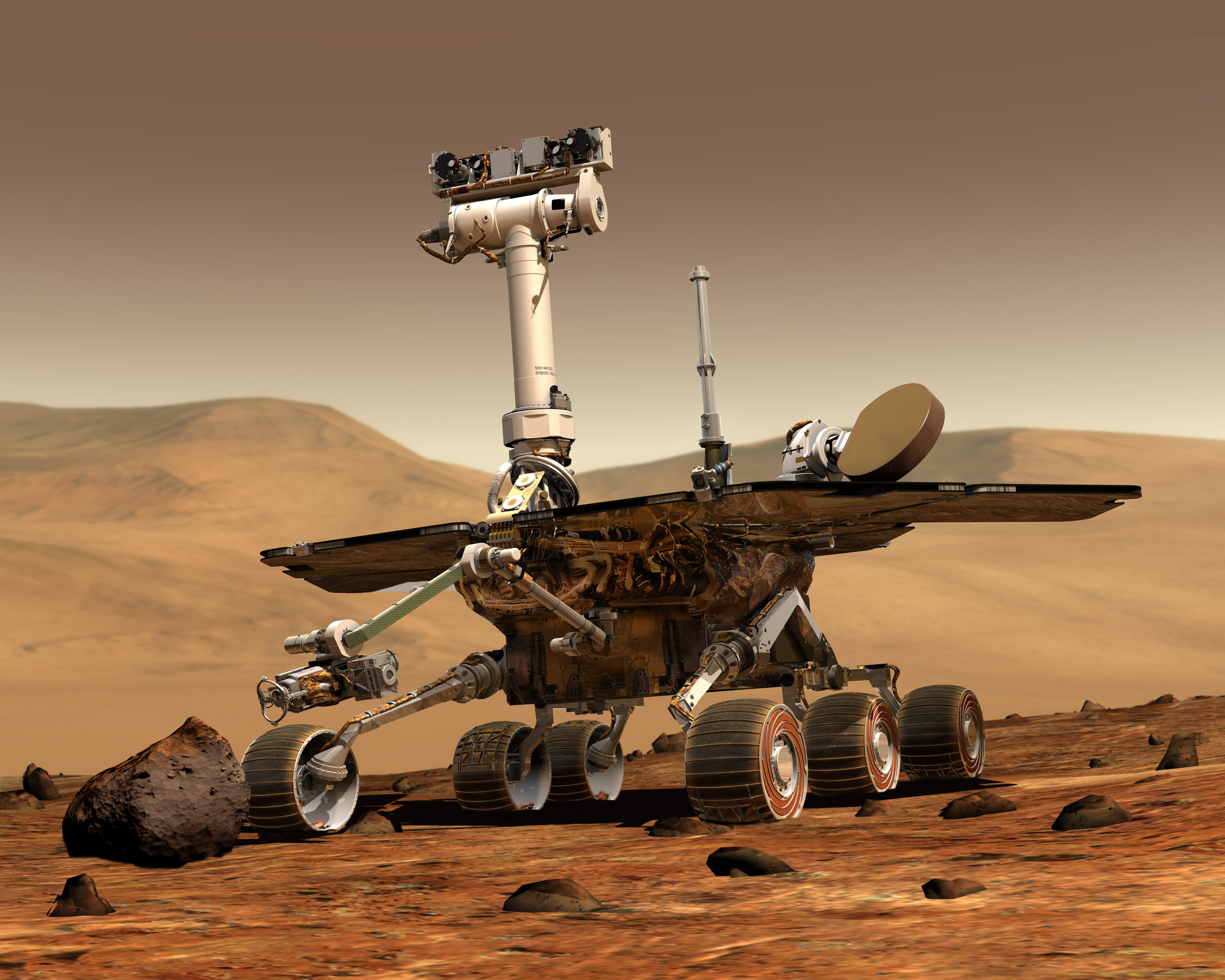
Artist's Concept of Rover on Mars (credit: Maas Digital LLC)

NASA's 2003 Mars Exploration Rover Mission amassed an enormous amount of scientific information related to the Martian geology and atmosphere, while also providing some astronomical observations from Mars. This article covers information gathered by the Opportunity rover during the initial phase of its mission. Information on science gathered by Spirit can be found mostly in the Spirit rover article.

The unmanned Mars exploration mission, commenced in 2003 sent two robotic rovers, Spirit and Opportunity, to explore the Martian surface and geology. The mission was led by Project Manager Peter Theisinger of NASA's Jet Propulsion Laboratory and Principal Investigator Steven Squyres, professor of astronomy at Cornell University.

Primary among the mission's scientific goals is to search for and characterize a wide range of rocks and soils that hold clues to past water activity on Mars. In recognition of the vast amount of scientific information amassed by both rovers, two asteroids have been named in their honor: 37452 Spirit and 39382 Opportunity.

On January 24, 2014, NASA reported that current studies on the planet Mars by the Curiosity and Opportunity rovers will now be searching for evidence of ancient life, including a biosphere based on autotrophic, chemotrophic or chemolithoautotrophic microorganisms, as well as ancient water, including fluvio-lacustrine environments (plains related to ancient rivers or lakes) that may have been habitable. The search for evidence of habitability, taphonomy (related to fossils), and organic carbon on the planet Mars is now a primary NASA objective.

== Water hypothesis ==
On March 2, 2004, NASA announced that "Opportunity has landed in an area of Mars where liquid water once drenched the surface". Associate administrator Ed Weiler told reporters that the area "would have been good habitable environment", although no traces of life have been found.

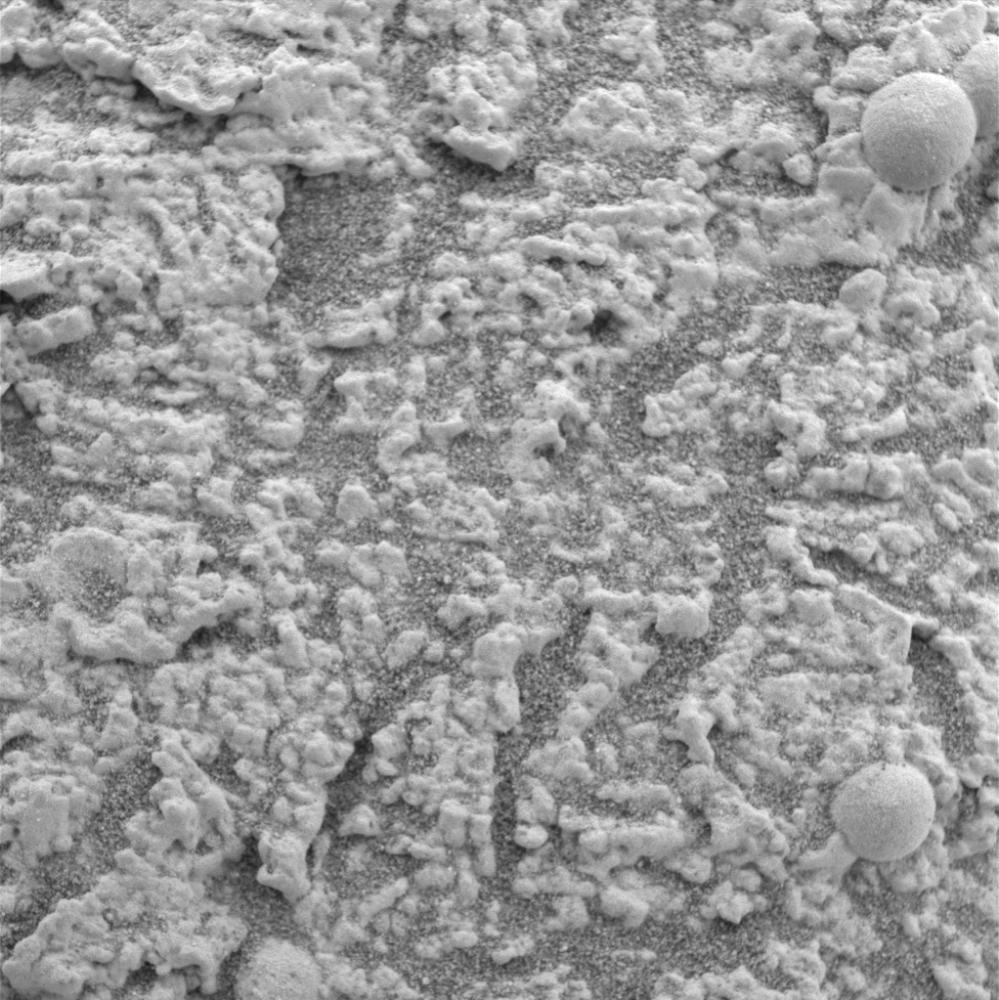
Larger grains suggest the presence of fluid.

This statement was made during a press conference, where mission scientists listed a number of observations that strongly support this view:

- Distributions of spherules

Hypothesis: Spherules are concretions created in water as a solvent.
Competing hypothesis: Spherules are rehardened molten rock droplets, created by volcanoes or meteor strikes.
Supporting data: Location of spherules in the rock matrix is random and evenly spread.
Quote from Steve Squyres: "The little spherules like blueberries in a muffin are embedded in this rock and weathering out of it. Three ideas, lapilli, little volcanic hailstones, one possibility. Two, droplets of volcanic glass or impact. We've looked at these things very carefully. Probably concretions. If so, it's pointing towards water."

Detailed analysis of environmental, chemical, and mineralogical data taken from the Opportunity rover led to the elimination of the competing hypotheses, and the confirmation of the conclusion that the spherules were formed in place as post-depositional sedimentary concretions from an aqueous source

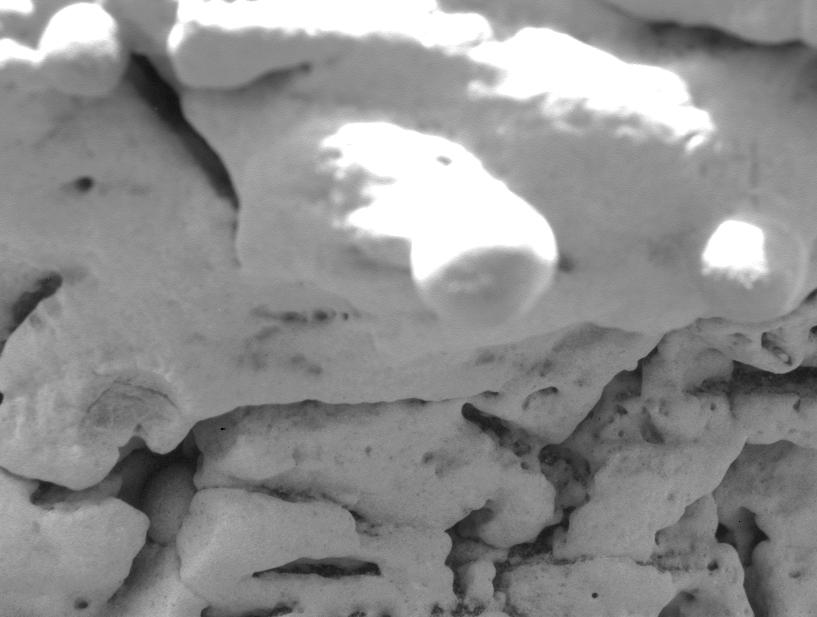
In the lower left, a spherule can be seen penetrating the interior of a vug.

- Vugs

Hypothesis: Rock was formed in water, for instance by precipitation.
Competing hypothesis: Rock were formed by ash deposits.
Supporting data: Voids found in bedrock resemble "vugs" which are left by eroded away, disk-shaped crystals, possibly dissolved in a watery environment.
Quote from Steve Squyres: The second piece of evidence is that when we looked at it close-up, it was shot through with tabular holes. Familiar forms. When crystals grow within rocks, precipitated from water. If they're tabular, as they grow you can get tabular crystals and water chem changes and they go away or they weather away."

- Sulfates and jarosite

Hypothesis: Water created tell-tale salt chemicals in the rock.
Competing hypothesis: Chemistry of rocks is determined by volcanic processes.
Supporting data: Sulfate salts and jarosite mineral were found in the rock. On Earth they are made in standing water (possibly during evaporation).
Quote from Steve Squyres: "Next piece of evidence comes from APXS. We found it looked like a lot of sulfur. That was the outside of the rock. We brought with us a grinding tool, the RAT and we ground away 2-4 mm and found even more sulfur. Too much to explain by other than that this rock is full of sulfate salts. That's a telltale sign of liquid water. Mini-TES also found evidence of sulfate salts. Most compelling of all, the Mössbauer spectrometer in the RATted space showed compelling evidence of jarosite, an iron-(III) sulfate basic hydrate. Fairly rare, found on Earth and had been predicted that it might be found on Mars some day. This is a mineral that you got to have water around to make."

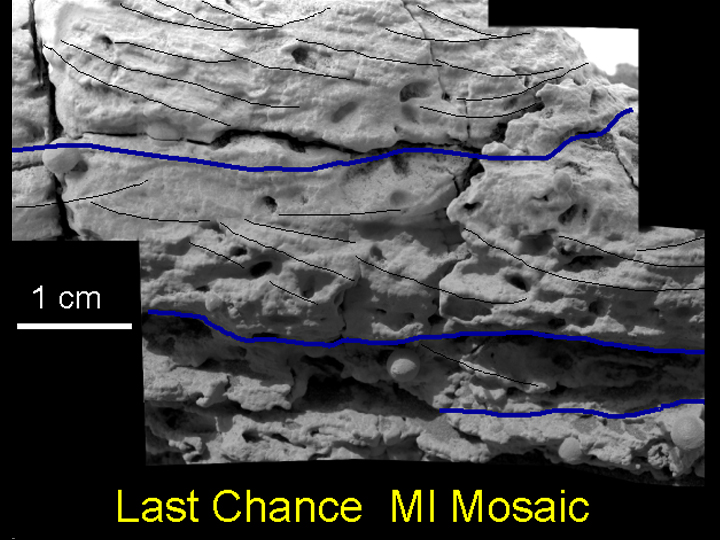
Crossbedding features in rock "Last Chance"

On March 23, 2004, NASA announced that they believe that Opportunity had not landed in a location merely "drenched in water", but on what was once a coastal area. "We think Opportunity is parked on what was once the shoreline of a salty sea on Mars," said Dr. Steve Squyres of Cornell University.

The announcement was based on evidence of sedimentary rocks that are consistent with those formed by water and not wind. "Bedding patterns in some finely layered rocks indicate the sand-sized grains of sediment that eventually bonded together were shaped into ripples by water at least five centimeters (two inches) deep, possibly much deeper, and flowing at a speed of 10 to 50 centimeters (four to 20 inches) per second," said Dr. John Grotzinger, from MIT. The landing site was likely a salt flat on the edge of a large body of water that was covered by shallow water.

Other evidence includes findings of chlorine and bromine in the rocks which indicates the rocks had at least soaked in mineral-rich water, possibly from underground sources, after they formed. Increased assurance of the bromine findings strengthens the case that rock-forming particles precipitated from surface water as salt concentrations climbed past saturation while water was evaporating.

The evidence for water was published in a series of scientific papers, with the initial results appearing in the journal Science and then with a detailed discussion of the sedimentary geology of the landing site appearing in a special issue of the journal Earth and Planetary Science Letters

== Spherules and hematite ==
Early in the mission, mission scientists were able to prove that the abundant spherules at Eagle crater were the source of hematite in the area discovered from orbit.

=== Hematite ===
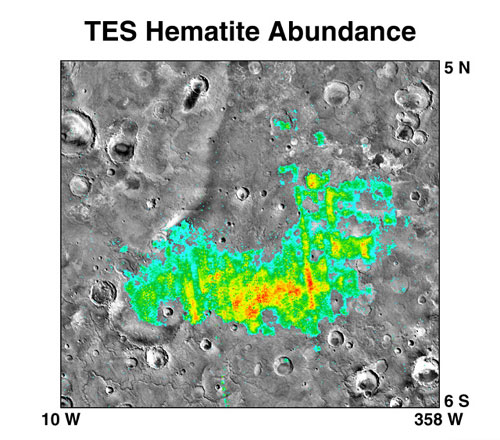
The distribution of hematite in Sinus Meridiani, where Meridiani Planum is located

Geologists were eager to reach a hematite-rich area (in the center of the picture at right) to closely examine the soil, which may reveal secrets about how the hematite got to this location. Knowing how the hematite on Mars was formed may help scientists characterize the past environment and determine whether that environment provided favorable conditions for life.

"Grey hematite is a mineral indicator of past water," said Dr. Joy Crisp, JPL project scientist. "It is not always associated with water, but it often is."

Scientists have wanted to find out which of these processes created grey hematite on Mars since 1998, when Mars Global Surveyor spotted large concentrations of the mineral near the planet's equator (seen in the right picture). This discovery provided the first mineral evidence that Mars' history may have included water.

"We want to know if the grains of hematite appear to be rounded and cemented together by the action of liquid water or if they're crystals that grew from a volcanic melt," said Crisp. "Is the hematite in layers, which would suggest that it was laid down by water, or in veins in the rock, which would be more characteristic of water having flowed through the rocks."

The next picture shows a mineral map, the first ever made on the surface of another planet, which was generated from a section of the panorama picture overlaid with data taken from the rover's Mini-TES. The Mini-TES spectral data was analyzed in a way that the concentration of the mineral hematite was deduced and its level coded in color. Red and orange mean high concentration, green and blue low concentration.

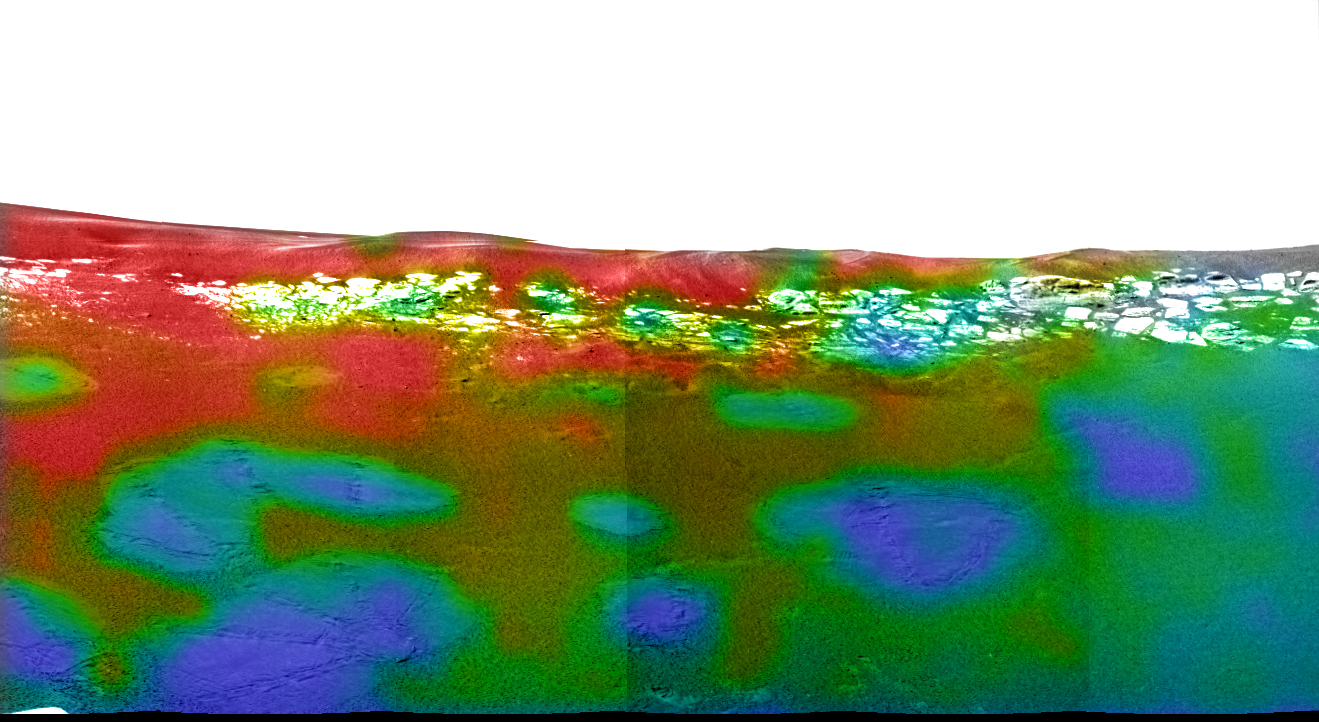
This spectral map of Eagle crater shows hematite.

The next picture shows a hematite abundance "index map" that helps geologists choose hematite-rich locations to visit around Opportunity's landing site. Blue dots equal areas low in hematite and red dots equal areas high in hematite. The colored dots represent data collected by the miniature Thermal Emission Spectrometer on Sol 11, after Opportunity had rolled off of the lander and the rover was located at the center of the blue semicircle (the spectrometer is located on the panoramic camera mast).

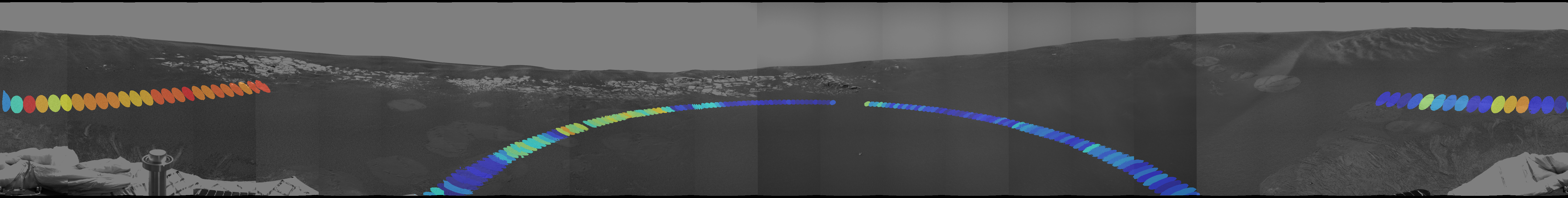
A hematite abundance index map of Eagle crater

The area to the left (with high concentration of hematite) was selected by mission members for further investigation, and called Hematite Slope.

During Sol 23 (February 16) Opportunity successfully trenched the soil at Hematite Slope and started to investigate the details of the layering.

=== Spherules ===
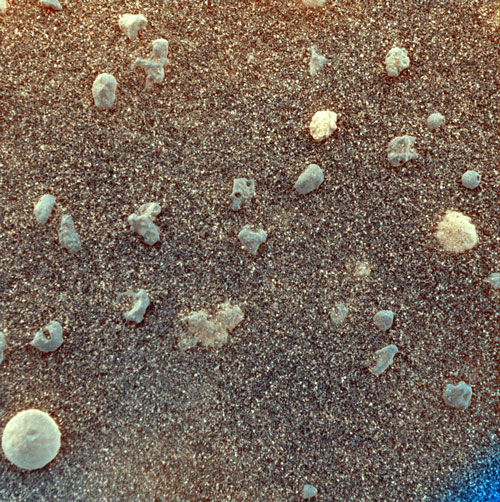
This color-enhanced image shows spherical granules.

Microscopic images of the soil taken by Opportunity revealed small spherically shaped granules. They were first seen on pictures taken on Sol 10, right after the rover drove from the lander onto martian soil.

When Opportunity dug her first trench (Sol 23), pictures of the lower layers showed similar round spherules. But this time they had a very shiny surface that created strong glints and glares. "They appear shiny or polished," said Albert Yen, science team member, during a press conference on February 19. He said: "Data will hopefully help us figure out what's altering them." At the same press briefing, Dr. Squyres noted this as one of the main question: "Where did those spherules come from, dropped from above or grown in place?"

Mission scientists reported on March 2 that they concluded a survey of the distribution of spherules in the bedrock. They found that they spread out evenly and randomly inside the rocks, and not in layers. This supports the notion that they grew in place, since if their origin was related to volcanic or meteoric episodes one would expect layers of spherules as a "record in time" for each event. This observation was added to the list of evidence for liquid water being present at this rock site, where it is thought the spherules formed.

=== Berry Bowl ===
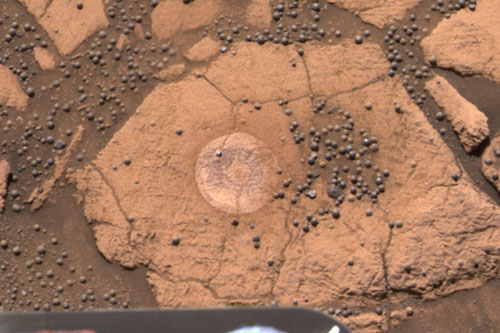
The rock "Berry Bowl"

On March 18 the results of the investigation of the area called "Berry Bowl" was announced. This site is a large rock with a small, bowl-shaped depression, in which a large number of spherules had accumulated. The MIMOS II Mössbauer spectrometer was used to analyze the depression and then the area of the rock right beside it. Any difference in the measured data was then attributed to the material in the spherules. A large difference in the obtained "spectra" was found. "This is the fingerprint of hematite, so we conclude that the major iron-bearing mineral in the berries is hematite," said Daniel Rodionov, a rover science team collaborator from the University of Mainz, Germany. This discovery seems to strengthen the conclusion, that spherules are concretions, grown in wet condition with dissolved iron.

== Rocks and minerals ==
The rocks on the plains of Gusev are a type of basalt. They contain the minerals olivine, pyroxene, plagioclase, and magnetite, and they look like volcanic basalt as they are fine-grained with irregular holes (geologists would say they have vesicles and vugs). Much of the soil on the plains came from the breakdown of the local rocks. Fairly high levels of nickel were found in some soils; probably from meteorites. Analysis shows that the rocks have been slightly altered by tiny amounts of water. Outside coatings and cracks inside the rocks suggest water deposited minerals, maybe bromine compounds. All the rocks contain a fine coating of dust and one or more harder rinds of material. One type can be brushed off, while another needed to be ground off by the Rock Abrasion Tool (RAT).

There are a variety of rocks in the Columbia Hills (Mars), some of which have been altered by water, but not by very much water.

The dust in Gusev Crater is the same as dust all around the planet. All the dust was found to be magnetic. Moreover, Spirit found the magnetism was caused by the mineral magnetite, especially magnetite that contained the element titanium. One magnet was able to completely divert all dust hence all Martian dust is thought to be magnetic. The spectra of the dust was similar to spectra of bright, low thermal inertia regions like Tharsis and Arabia that have been detected by orbiting satellites. A thin layer of dust, maybe less than one millimeter thick covers all surfaces. Something in it contains a small amount of chemically bound water.

=== Plains ===
Adirondack
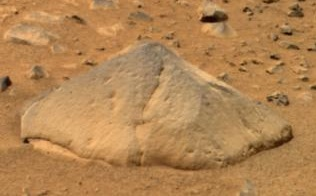
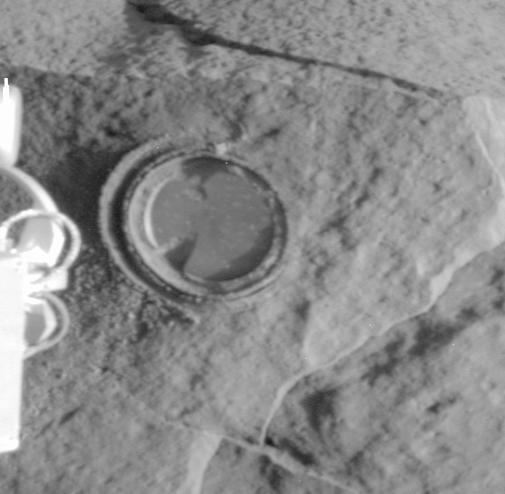
- Above: An approximate true color view of Adirondack, taken by Spirit's pancam Right: Digital camera image (from Spirit's Pancam) of Adirondack after a RAT grind (Spirit's rock grinding tool)
- Feature type: Rock
- Coordinates: 14.6°S 175.5°E

Observations of rocks on the plains show they contain the minerals pyroxene, olivine, plagioclase, and magnetite. These rocks can be classified in different ways. The amounts and types of minerals make the rocks primitive basalts—also called picritic basalts. The rocks are similar to ancient terrestrial rocks called basaltic komatiites. Rocks of the plains also resemble the basaltic shergottites, meteorites which came from Mars. One classification system compares the amount of alkali elements to the amount of silica on a graph; in this system, Gusev plains rocks lay near the junction of basalt, picrobasalt, and tephrite. The Irvine-Barager classification calls them basalts. Plain's rocks have been very slightly altered, probably by thin films of water because they are softer and contain veins of light colored material that may be bromine compounds, as well as coatings or rinds. It is thought that small amounts of water may have gotten into cracks inducing mineralization processes. Coatings on the rocks may have occurred when rocks were buried and interacted with thin films of water and dust. One sign that they were altered was that it was easier to grind these rocks compared to the same types of rocks found on Earth.

The first rock that Spirit studied was Adirondack. It turned out to be typical of the other rocks on the plains.

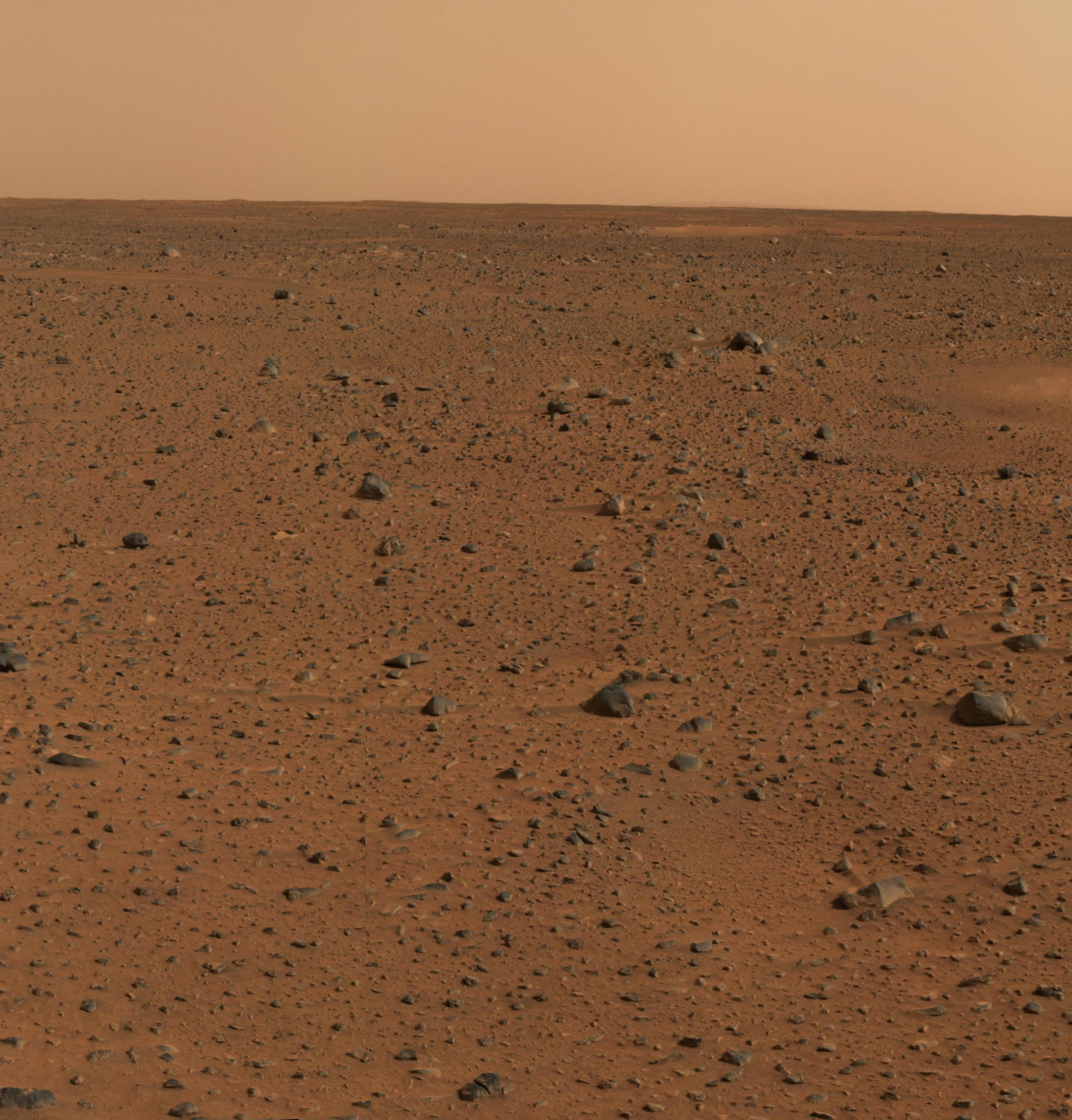
First color picture from Gusev crater. Rocks were found to be basalt. Everything was covered with a fine dust that Spirit determined was magnetic because of the mineral magnetite.

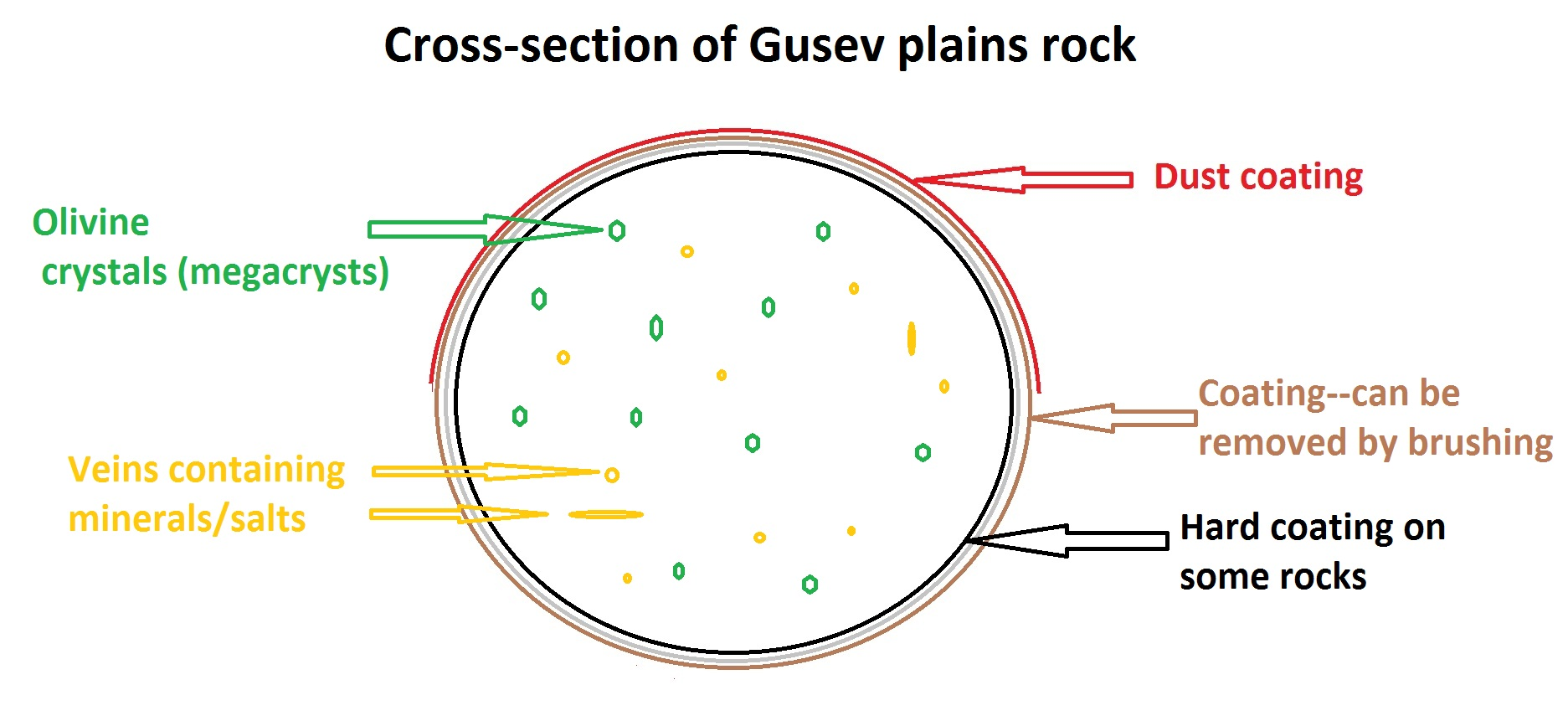
Cross-sectional drawing of a typical rock from the plains of Gusev crater. Most rocks contain a coating of dust and one or more harder coatings. Veins of water-deposited minerals are visible, along with crystals of olivine. Veins may contain bromine salts.

=== Columbia Hills ===
Scientists found a variety of rock types in the Columbia Hills, and they placed them into six different categories. The six are: Clovis, Wishbone, Peace, Watchtower, Backstay, and Independence. They are named after a prominent rock in each group. Their chemical compositions, as measured by APXS, are significantly different from each other. Most importantly, all of the rocks in Columbia Hills show various degrees of alteration due to aqueous fluids. They are enriched in the elements phosphorus, sulfur, chlorine, and bromine—all of which can be carried around in water solutions. The Columbia Hills' rocks contain basaltic glass, along with varying amounts of olivine and sulfates. The olivine abundance varies inversely with the amount of sulfates. This is exactly what is expected because water destroys olivine but helps to produce sulfates.

Acid fog is believed to have changed some of the Watchtower rocks. This was in a 200 meter long section of Cumberland Ridge and the Husband Hill summit. Certain places became less crystalline and more amorphous. Acidic water vapor from volcanoes dissolved some minerals forming a gel. When water evaporated a cement formed and produced small bumps. This type of process has been observed in the lab when basalt rocks are exposed to sulfuric and hydrochloric acids.

The Clovis group is especially interesting because the Mössbauer spectrometer(MB) detected goethite in it. Goethite forms only in the presence of water, so its discovery is the first direct evidence of past water in the Columbia Hills's rocks. In addition, the MB spectra of rocks and outcrops displayed a strong decline in olivine presence, although the rocks probably once contained much olivine. Olivine is a marker for the lack of water because it easily decomposes in the presence of water. Sulfate was found, and it needs water to form. Wishstone contained a great deal of plagioclase, some olivine, and anhydrate (a sulfate). Peace rocks showed sulfur and strong evidence for bound water, so hydrated sulfates are suspected. Watchtower class rocks lack olivine consequently they may have been altered by water. The Independence class showed some signs of clay (perhaps montmorillonite a member of the smectite group). Clays require fairly long term exposure to water to form. One type of soil, called Paso Robles, from the Columbia Hills, may be an evaporate deposit because it contains large amounts of sulfur, phosphorus, calcium, and iron. Also, MB found that much of the iron in Paso Robles soil was of the oxidized, Fe^{+++} form, which would happen if water had been present.

Towards the middle of the six-year mission (a mission that was supposed to last only 90 days), large amounts of pure silica were found in the soil. The silica could have come from the interaction of soil with acid vapors produced by volcanic activity in the presence of water or from water in a hot spring environment.

After Spirit stopped working scientists studied old data from the Miniature Thermal Emission Spectrometer, or Mini-TES and confirmed the presence of large amounts of carbonate-rich rocks, which means that regions of the planet may have once harbored water. The carbonates were discovered in an outcrop of rocks called "Comanche."

In summary, Spirit found evidence of slight weathering on the plains of Gusev, but no evidence that a lake was there. However, in the Columbia Hills there was clear evidence for a moderate amount of aqueous weathering. The evidence included sulfates and the minerals goethite and carbonates which only form in the presence of water. It is believed that Gusev crater may have held a lake long ago, but it has since been covered by igneous materials. All the dust contains a magnetic component which was identified as magnetite with some titanium. Furthermore, the thin coating of dust that covers everything on Mars is the same in all parts of Mars.

== First atmospheric temperature profile ==
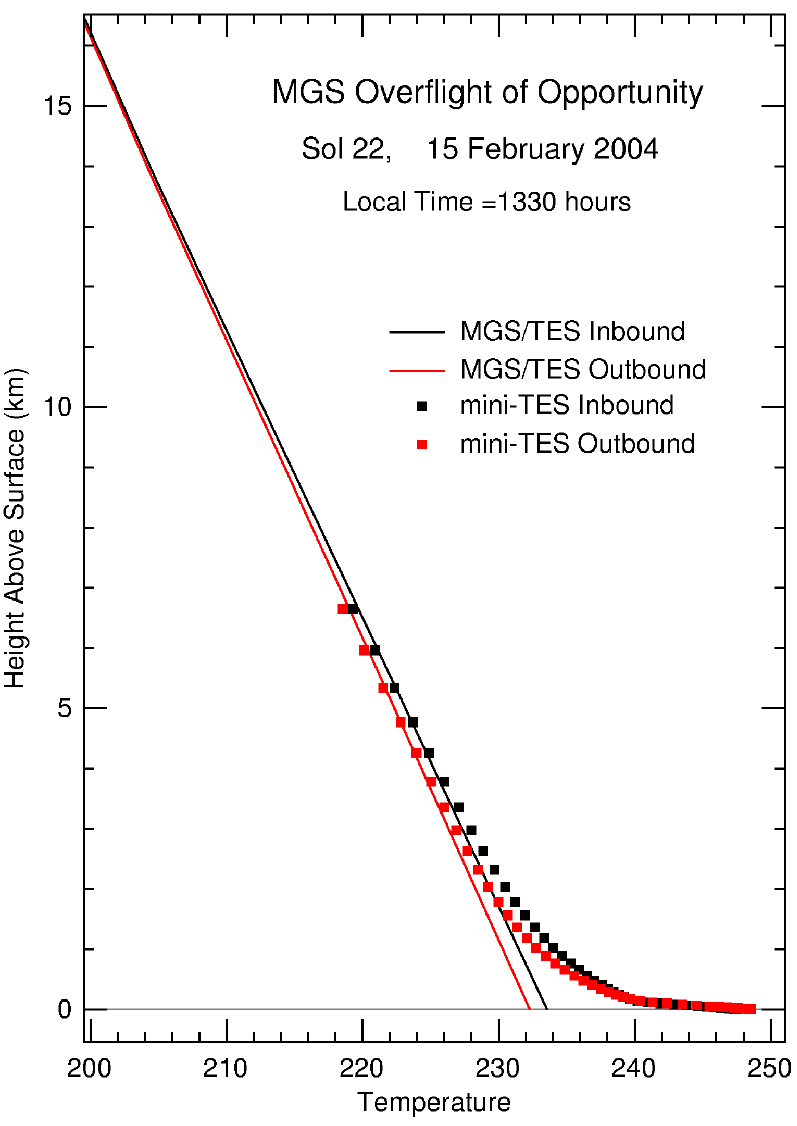
Temperature profile taken by MGS over the MER-B site

During a press conference on March 11, 2004, mission scientists presented the first temperature profile of the martian atmosphere ever measured. It was obtained by combining data taken from the Opportunity Mini-TES infrared spectrometer with data from the TES instrument on board the Mars Global Surveyor (MGS) orbiter. This was necessary because Opportunity can only see up to 6 km high, and the MGS camera could not measure data all the way down to the ground. The data was acquired on February 15 (Sol 22) and is split into two data sets: Since the orbiter is in motion, some data was taken while it was approaching the Opportunity site, other when it was moving away. In the graph, these sets are marked "inbound" (black color) and "outbound" (red color). The dots represent Mini-TES (= rover) data and the straight lines are TES (=orbiter) data.

Atmospheric science from the MER rovers has been published in a series of scientific papers in Science and Journal of Geophysical Research

== Astronomical observations ==
Opportunity observed the eclipse, or transits of Phobos and transits of Deimos across the Sun, and photographed the Earth, which appeared as a bright celestial object in the Martian sky.

A transit of Mercury from Mars took place on January 12, 2005 from about 14:45 UTC to 23:05 UTC, but camera resolution did not permit seeing Mercury's 6.1" angular diameter.

Transits of Deimos across the Sun were seen, but at 2' angular diameter, Deimos is about 20 times larger than Mercury's 6.1" angular diameter.

== See also ==
- Aeolis quadrangle
- Composition of Mars
- Curiosity rover
- Exploration of Mars
- Geology of Mars
- Groundwater on Mars
- Margaritifer Sinus quadrangle
- Mars Science Laboratory
- Mars 2020 rover mission
- Opportunity Rover
- Space exploration
- Unmanned space missions
- Water on Mars
