= Timekeeping on Mars =

Proposed approaches to tracking date and time on the planet Mars

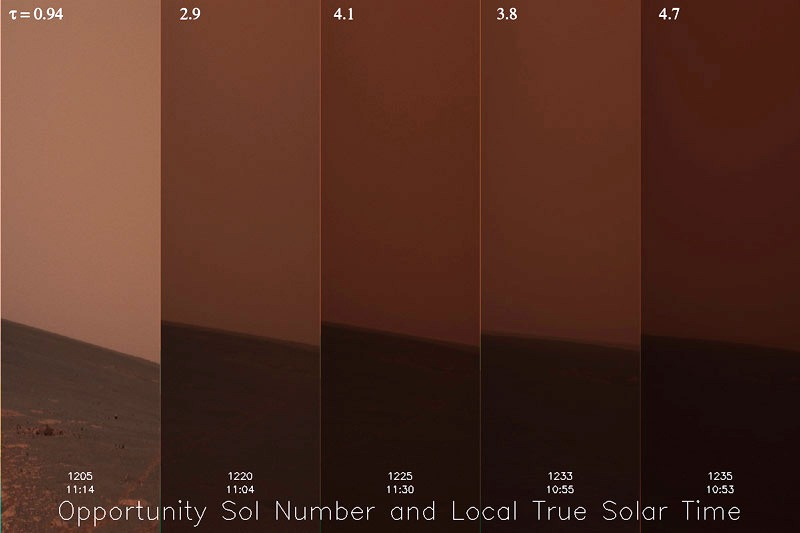
Martian dust in the air changing over time near Opportunity, time noted in mission sols and solar time

Though no standard exists, numerous calendars and other timekeeping approaches have been proposed for the planet Mars. The most commonly seen in the scientific literature denotes the time of year as the number of degrees on its orbit from the northward equinox, and increasingly there is use of numbering the Martian years beginning at the equinox that occurred April 11, 1955.

== Orbit of Mars ==
(In red) Martian season lengths and time as compared to seasons on Earth (in blue), with marks for the vernal equinox, perihelion, and aphelion

Mars has an axial tilt and a rotation period similar to those of Earth. Thus, it experiences seasons of spring, summer, autumn and winter much like Earth. Mars's orbital eccentricity is considerably larger, which causes its seasons to vary significantly in length. A sol, or Martian day, is not that different from an Earth day: less than an hour longer. However, a Mars year is almost twice as long as an Earth year.

== Sols ==
The average length of a Martian sidereal day is 24 h 37 m 22.663 s (88,642.663 seconds based on SI units), and the length of its solar day is 24 h 39 m 35.244 s (88,775.244 seconds). The corresponding values for Earth are currently 23 h 56 m 4.0916 s and 24 h 00 m 00.002 s, respectively, which yields a conversion factor of 1.0274912517 Earth days per sol: thus, Mars's solar day is only about 2.75% longer than Earth's; approximately 73 sols pass for every 75 Earth days.

The term "sol" is used by planetary scientists to refer to the duration of a solar day on Mars. The term was adopted during NASA's Viking project (1976) in order to avoid confusion with an Earth "day". By inference, Mars's "solar hour" is 1/24 of a sol (1 h 1 min 39 s), a "solar minute" 1/60 of a solar hour (61.65 seconds), and a "solar second" 1/60 of a solar minute (1.0275 seconds).

=== Mars Sol Date ===
When accounting solar days on Earth, astronomers often use Julian dates—a simple sequential count of days—for timekeeping purposes. An analogous system for Mars has been proposed "[f]or historical utility with respect to the Earth-based atmospheric, visual mapping, and polar-cap observations of Mars, ... a sequential count of sol-numbers". (Note: Sol (borrowed from the Latin word for sun) is a solar day on Mars.) This Mars Sol Date (MSD) starts "prior to the 1877 perihelic opposition." Thus, the MSD is a running count of sols since 29 December 1873 (coincidentally the birth date of astronomer Carl Otto Lampland). Numerically, the Mars Sol Date is defined as MSD = (JD − 2451549.5)/1.0274912517 + 44796.0 − 0.0009626, where JD is the Julian Date using Terrestrial Time.

== Time of day ==
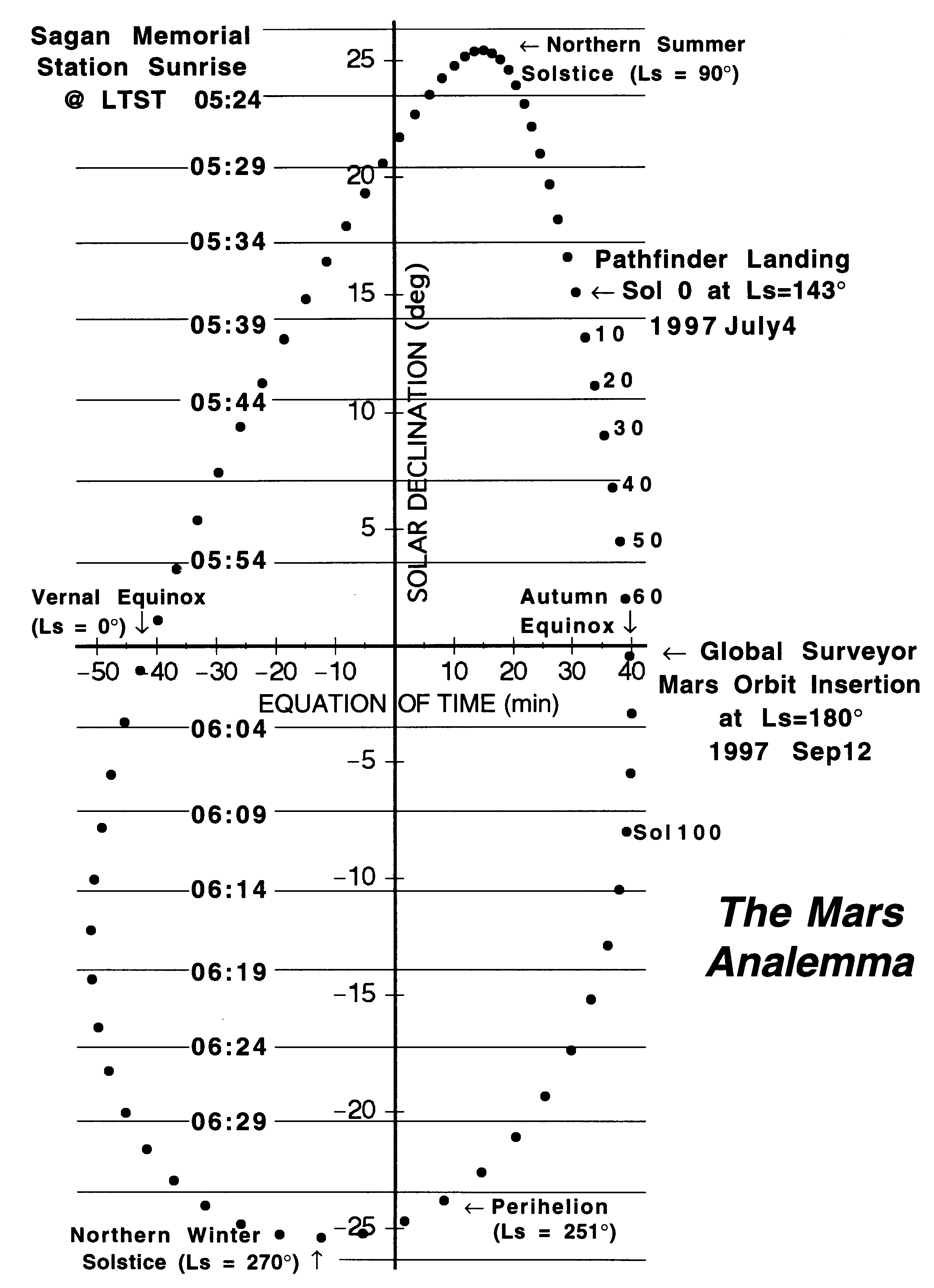
The analemma for Mars

A convention used by spacecraft lander projects to date has been to enumerate local solar time using a 24-hour "Mars clock" on which the hours, minutes and seconds are 2.75% longer than their standard (Earth) durations.

This has the advantage that no handling of times greater than 23:59 is needed, so standard tools can be used. The Mars time of noon is 12:00 which is in Earth time 12 hours 20 minutes after midnight.

For the Mars Pathfinder, Mars Exploration Rover (MER), Phoenix, and Mars Science Laboratory missions, the operations teams have worked on "Mars time", with a work schedule synchronized to the local time at the landing site on Mars, rather than the Earth day. This results in the crew's schedule sliding approximately 40 minutes later in Earth time each day. Wristwatches calibrated in Martian time, rather than Earth time, were used by many of the MER team members.

Local solar time has a significant impact on planning the daily activities of Mars landers. Daylight is needed for the solar panels of landed spacecraft. Its temperature rises and falls rapidly at sunrise and sunset because Mars does not have Earth's thick atmosphere and oceans that soften such fluctuations. Consensus has recently been gained in the scientific community studying Mars to similarly define Martian local hours as 1/24 of a Mars day.

As on Earth, on Mars there is also an equation of time that represents the difference between sundial time and uniform (clock) time. The equation of time is illustrated by an analemma. Because of orbital eccentricity, the length of the solar day is not quite constant. Because its orbital eccentricity is greater than that of Earth, the length of day varies from the average by a greater amount than that of Earth, and hence its equation of time shows greater variation than that of Earth: on Mars, the Sun can run 51 minutes slower or 40 minutes faster than a Martian clock (on Earth, the corresponding figures are 14 min 22 s slower and 16 min 23 s faster).

Mars has a prime meridian, defined as passing through the small crater Airy-0. The prime meridian was first proposed by German astronomers Wilhelm Beer and Johann Heinrich Mädler in 1830 as marked by the fork in the albedo feature later named Sinus Meridiani by Italian astronomer Giovanni Schiaparelli. This convention was readily adopted by the astronomical community, the result being that Mars had a universally accepted prime meridian half a century before the International Meridian Conference of 1884 established one for Earth. The definition of the Martian prime meridian has since been refined on the basis of spacecraft imagery as the center of the crater Airy-0 in Terra Meridiani.

However, Mars does not have time zones defined at regular intervals from the prime meridian, as on Earth. Each lander so far has used an approximation of local solar time as its frame of reference, as cities did on Earth before the introduction of standard time in the 19th century. (The two Mars Exploration Rovers happen to be approximately 12 hours 1 minute apart.)

Since the late 1990s and arrival of Mars Global Surveyor at Mars, the most widely used system for specifying locations on Mars has been planetocentric coordinates, which measure longitude 0°–360° East and latitude angles from the center of Mars. An alternative system that was used before then is planetographic coordinates, which measure longitudes as 0°–360° West and determined latitudes as mapped onto the surface. However, planetographic coordinates remain in use, such as on the MAVEN orbiter project.

=== Coordinated Mars Time ===
Coordinated Mars Time (MTC) or Martian Coordinated Time is a proposed Mars analog to Universal Time (UT1) on Earth. It is defined as the mean solar time at Mars's prime meridian. The name "MTC" is intended to parallel Earth's Coordinated Universal Time (UTC), but this is somewhat misleading: what distinguishes UTC from other forms of UT is its leap seconds, but MTC does not use any such scheme. MTC is more closely analogous to UT1.

Use of the term "Martian Coordinated Time" as a planetary standard time first appeared in a journal article in 2000. The abbreviation "MTC" was used in some versions of the related Mars24 Sunclock coded by the NASA Goddard Institute for Space Studies. That application has also denoted the standard time as "Airy Mean Time" (AMT), in analogy of Greenwich Mean Time (GMT). In an astronomical context, "GMT" is a deprecated name for Universal Time, or sometimes more specifically for UT1.

Neither AMT or MTC has yet been employed in mission timekeeping. This is partially attributable to uncertainty regarding the position of Airy-0 (relative to other longitudes), which meant that AMT could not be realized as accurately as local time at points being studied. At the start of the Mars Exploration Rover missions, the positional uncertainty of Airy-0 corresponded to roughly a 20-second uncertainty in realizing AMT. In order to refine the location of the prime meridian, it has been proposed that it be based on a specification that the Viking Lander 1 is located at 47.95137°W.

== Lander mission clocks ==
When a NASA spacecraft lander begins operations on Mars, the passing Martian days (sols) are tracked using a simple numerical count. The two Viking mission landers, Mars Phoenix, the Mars Science Laboratory rover Curiosity, InSight, and Mars 2020 Perseverance missions all count the sol on which the lander touched down as "Sol 0". Mars Pathfinder and the two Mars Exploration Rovers instead defined touchdown as "Sol 1".

Each successful lander mission so far has used its own "time zone", corresponding to some defined version of local solar time at the landing site location. Of the nine successful NASA Mars landers to date, eight employed offsets from local mean solar time (LMST) for the lander site while the ninth (Mars Pathfinder) used local true solar time (LTST).

Information as to whether China's Zhurong rover project has used a similar timekeeping system of recording the sol number and LMST (or offset) has not been disseminated.

=== Viking Landers ===
The "local lander time" for the two Viking mission landers were offsets from LMST at the respective lander sites. In both cases, the initial clock midnight was set to match local true midnight immediately preceding touchdown.

=== Pathfinder ===
Mars Pathfinder used the local apparent solar time at its location of landing. Its time zone was AAT−02:13:01, where "AAT" is Airy Apparent Time, meaning apparent (true) solar time at Airy-0. The difference between the true and mean solar time (AMT and AAT) is the Martian equation of time.

Pathfinder kept track of the days with a sol count starting on Sol 1 (corresponding to MSD 43905), on which it landed at night at 02:56:55 (mission clock; 4:41 AMT).

=== Spirit and Opportunity ===
The two Mars Exploration Rovers did not use mission clocks matched to the LMST of their landing points. For mission planning purposes, they instead defined a time scale that would approximately match the clock to the apparent solar time about halfway through the nominal 90-sol primary mission. This was referred to in mission planning as "Hybrid Local Solar Time" (HLST) or as the "MER Continuous Time Algorithm". These time scales were uniform in the sense of mean solar time (i.e., they approximate the mean time of some longitude) and were not adjusted as the rovers traveled. (The rovers traveled distances that could make a few seconds difference to local solar time.) The HLST of Spirit is AMT+11:00:04 whereas the LMST at its landing site is AMT+11:41:55. The HLST of Opportunity is AMT−01:01:06 whereas the LMST at its landing site is AMT−00:22:06. Neither rover was likely to ever reach the longitude at which its mission time scale matches local mean time. However, for atmospheric measurements and other science purposes, Local True Solar Time is recorded.

Spirit and Opportunity both started their sol counts with Sol 1 on the day of landing, corresponding to MSD 46216 and MSD 46236, respectively.

=== Phoenix ===
The Phoenix lander project specified a mission clock that matched LMST at the planned landing longitude of 126.65°W (233.35°E). This corresponds to a mission clock of AMT−08:26:36. The actual landing site was 0.900778° (19.8 km) east of that, corresponding to 3 min 36 s later in local solar time. The date is kept using a mission clock sol count with the landing occurring on Sol 0, corresponding to MSD 47776 (mission time zone); the landing occurred around 16:35 LMST, which is MSD 47777 at 01:02 AMT.

=== Curiosity ===
The Curiosity rover project specified a mission clock that matched Local Mean Solar Time at its originally planned landing longitude of 137.42°E. This corresponds to a mission clock of AMT+09:09:40.8. The actual landing site was about 0.02° (1.3 km) east of that, a difference of about 5 seconds in solar time. The local mean solar time is also affected by the rover motion; at 4.6°S, this is about 1 second of time difference for every 246 m of displacement along the east–west direction. The date is kept using a mission clock sol count with the landing occurring on Sol 0, corresponding to MSD 49269 (mission time zone); the landing occurred around 14:53 LMST (05:53 AMT).

=== InSight ===
The InSight lander project specified a mission clock that matched Local Mean Solar Time at its planned landing site of 135.97°E. This corresponds to a mission clock of AMT+09:03:53. The actual landing site was at 135.623447°E, or 0.346553° (20.5 km) west of the reference longitude, so the lander mission clock is 1 min 23 s ahead of the actual mean local solar time at the lander location. The date is kept using a mission clock sol count with the landing occurring on Sol 0, corresponding to MSD 51511 (mission time zone); landing occurred around 14:23 LMST (05:14 AMT).

=== Perseverance ===
The Perseverance rover project specified a mission clock that matched Local Mean Solar Time at a planned landing longitude of 77.43°E. This corresponds to a mission clock of AMT+05:09:43. The actual landing site was about 0.02° (1.2 km) east of that, a difference of about 5 seconds in solar time. The local mean solar time is also affected by the rover motion; at 18.4°N, this is about 1 second of time difference for every 234 m of displacement in the east–west direction. The date is kept using a mission clock sol count with the landing occurring on Sol 0, corresponding to MSD 52304 (mission time zone); landing occurred around 15:54 LMST (10:44 AMT).

=== Summary ===
Summary of Mars mission clocks and sol counts
Mission	Ref. long.	Clock offset	Type	Epoch (LT)
Pathfinder (1997)	33.25°W	AAT−02:13:01	LTST	Sol 1 = MSD 43905
Spirit (2004)	165.01°E	AMT+11:00:04	HLST	Sol 1 = MSD 46216
Opportunity (2004)	15.28°W	AMT−01:01:06	HLST	Sol 1 = MSD 46236
Phoenix (2008)	126.65°W	AMT−08:26:36	LMST	Sol 0 = MSD 47776
Curiosity (2012)	137.42°E	AMT+09:09:41	LMST	Sol 0 = MSD 49269
InSight (2018)	135.97°E	AMT+09:03:53	LMST	Sol 0 = MSD 51511
Perseverance (2021)	77.43°E	AMT+05:09:43	LMST	Sol 0 = MSD 52304

== Years ==
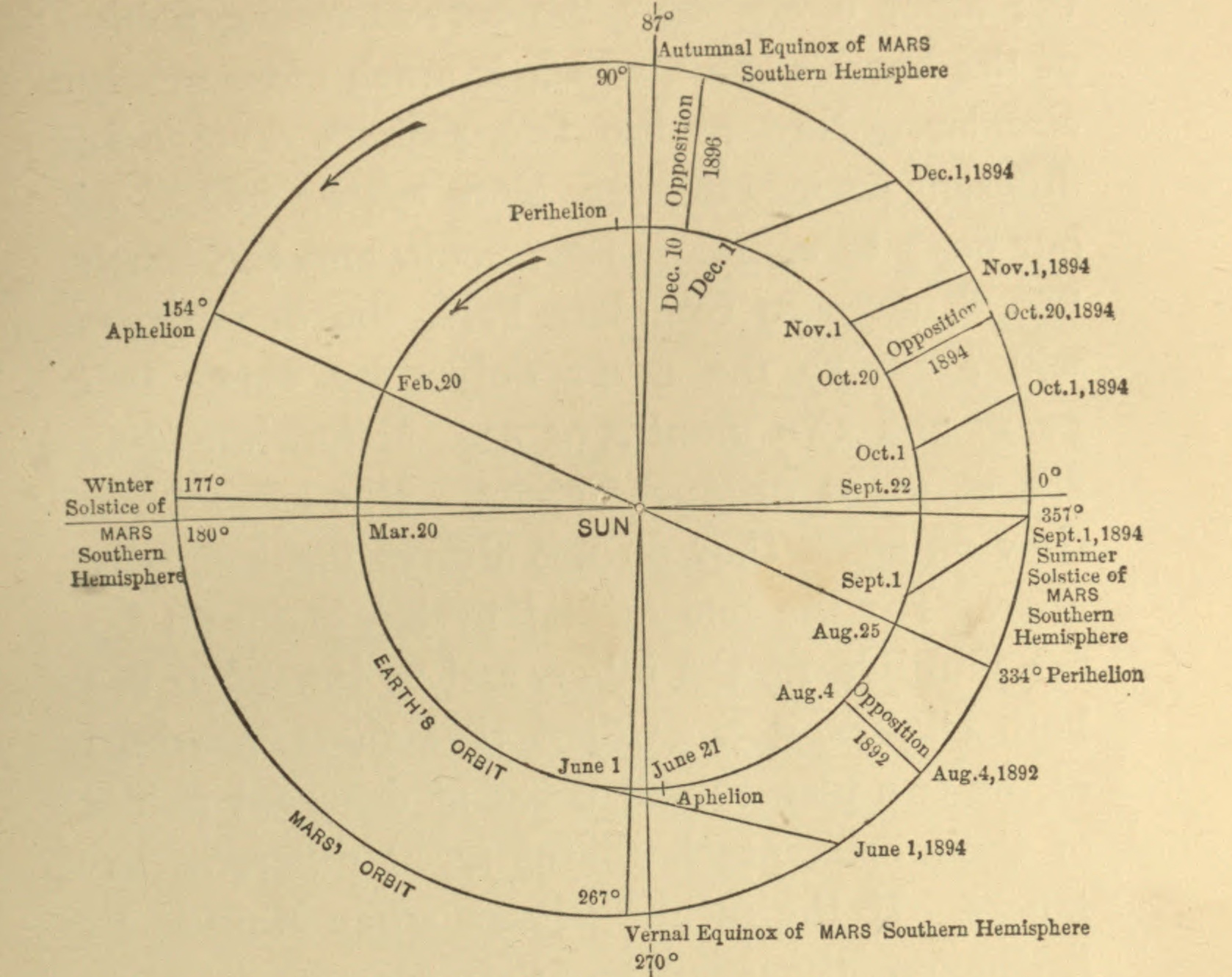
Diagram by Percival Lowell comparing the Martian and Earth years

=== Definition of year and seasons ===
The length of time for Mars to complete one orbit around the Sun in respect to the stars, its sidereal year, is about 686.98 Earth solar days (≈ 1.88 Earth years), or 668.5991 sols. Because of the eccentricity of Mars's orbit, the seasons are not of equal length. Assuming that seasons run from equinox to solstice or vice versa, the season L_{s} 0 to L_{s} 90 (northern-hemisphere spring and southern-hemisphere autumn) is the longest season lasting 194 Martian sols, and L_{s} 180 to L_{s} 270 (northern hemisphere autumn and southern-hemisphere spring) is the shortest season, lasting only 142 Martian sols.

As on Earth, the sidereal year is not the quantity that is needed for calendar purposes. Similarly, the tropical year would likely be used because it gives the best match to the progression of the seasons. It is slightly shorter than the sidereal year due to the precession of Mars's rotational axis. The precession cycle is 93,000 Martian years (175,000 Earth years), much longer than on Earth. Its length in tropical years can be computed by dividing the difference between the sidereal year and tropical year by the length of the tropical year.

Tropical year length depends on the starting point of measurement, due to the effects of Kepler's second law of planetary motion and precession. There are various possible years including the March (northward) equinox year, June (northern) solstice year, the September (southward) equinox year, the December (southern) solstice year, and the tropical year based on the mean sun. (See March equinox year.)

On Earth, the variation in the lengths of the tropical years is small, with the mean time from June solstice to June solstice being about a thousandth of a day shorter than that between two December solstices, but on Mars it is much larger because of the greater eccentricity of its orbit. The northward equinox year is 668.5907 sols, the northern solstice year is 668.5880 sols, the southward equinox year is 668.5940 sols, and the southern solstice year is 668.5958 sols (0.0078 sols more than the northern solstice year). (Since, like Earth, the northern and southern hemispheres of Mars have opposite seasons, equinoxes and solstices must be labelled by hemisphere to remove ambiguity.)

Seasons begin at 90 degree intervals of solar longitude (L_{s}) at equinoxes and solstices.

solar longitude (L_{s})	event	months	northern hemisphere		southern hemisphere	
solar longitude (L_{s})	event	months	event	season	event	seasons
0	northward equinox	1, 2, 3	vernal equinox	spring	autumnal equinox	autumn
90	northern solstice	4, 5, 6	summer solstice	summer	winter solstice	winter
180	southward equinox	7, 8, 9	autumnal equinox	autumn	vernal equinox	spring
270	southern solstice	10, 11, 12	winter solstice	winter	summer solstice	summer

=== Year numbering ===
For purposes of enumerating Mars years and facilitating data comparisons, a system increasingly used in the scientific literature, particularly studies of Martian climate, enumerates years relative to the northern spring equinox (L_{s} 0) that occurred on April 11, 1955, labeling that date the start of Mars Year 1 (MY1). The system was first described in a paper focused on seasonal temperature variation by R. Todd Clancy of the Space Science Institute. Although Clancy and co-authors described the choice as "arbitrary", the great dust storm of 1956 falls in MY1. This system has been extended by defining Mars Year 0 (MY0) as beginning May 24, 1953, and so allowing for negative year numbers.

Dates of Martian seasons for Mars Years
MY	NH spring equinox (L_{s} = 0°)	NH summer solstice (L_{s} = 90°)	NH autumnal equinox (L_{s} = 180°)	NH winter solstice (L_{s} = 270°)	Events Earth Date [Mars Year/L_{s}°]
0	1953-05-24				
1	1955-04-11	1955-10-27	1956-04-27	1956-09-21	great dust storm of 1956
2	1957-02-26	1957-09-13	1958-03-15	1958-08-09	
3	1959-01-14	1959-08-01	1960-01-31	1960-06-26	
4	1960-12-01	1961-06-18	1961-12-18	1962-05-14	
5	1962-10-19	1963-05-05	1963-11-05	1964-03-31	
6	1964-09-05	1965-03-22	1965-09-22	1966-02-15	1964-07-14 [6/143°] Mariner 4 flyby
7	1966-07-24	1967-02-07	1967-08-10	1968-01-03	
8	1968-06-10	1968-12-25	1969-06-27	1969-11-20	1969-07-31 [8/200°] Mariner 6 and Mariner 7 flybys
9	1970-04-28	1970-11-12	1971-05-15	1971-10-08	1971-11-14 [9/284°] Mariner 9 enters orbit 1971-11-27 Mars 2 enters orbit 1971-12-02 Mars 3 enters orbit
10	1972-03-15	1972-09-29	1973-04-01	1973-08-25	
11	1974-01-31	1974-08-17	1975-02-17	1975-07-13	1974-02 [11/0°] Mars 4 and Mars 5 enter orbit
12	1975-12-19	1976-07-04	1977-01-04	1977-05-30	1976-07 [12/88°] Viking 1 Orbiter & Lander arrive 1976-09 [12/116°] Viking 2 Orbiter & Lander arrive
13	1977-11-05	1978-05-22	1978-11-22	1979-04-17	
14	1979-09-23	1980-04-08	1980-10-09	1981-03-04	
15	1981-08-10	1982-02-24	1982-08-27	1983-01-20	
16	1983-06-28	1984-01-12	1984-07-14	1984-12-07	
17	1985-05-15	1985-11-29	1986-06-01	1986-10-25	
18	1987-04-01	1987-10-17	1988-04-18	1988-09-11	1989-01-29 [19/350°] Phobos 2 enters orbit
19	1989-02-16	1989-09-03	1990-03-06	1990-07-30	
20	1991-01-04	1991-07-22	1992-01-22	1992-06-16	
21	1992-11-21	1993-06-08	1993-12-08	1994-05-04	
22	1994-10-09	1995-04-26	1995-10-26	1996-03-21	
23	1996-08-26	1997-03-13	1997-09-12	1998-02-06	1997-07-04 [23/142°] Mars Pathfinder arrives 1997-09 [23/173°] Mars Global Surveyor enters orbit
24	1998-07-14	1999-01-29	1999-07-31	1999-12-25	
25	2000-05-31	2000-12-16	2001-06-17	2001-11-11	2001-10-24 [25/258°] Mars Odyssey enters orbit
26	2002-04-18	2002-11-03	2003-05-05	2003-09-29	2003-12-14 [26/315°] Nozomi flies past Mars; 2004-01 [26/325°] Mars Express, Spirit Rover, and Opportunity Rover arrive
27	2004-03-05	2004-09-20	2005-03-22	2005-08-16	
28	2006-01-21	2006-08-08	2007-02-07	2007-07-04	2006-03-10 [28/22°] Mars Reconnaissance Orbiter arrives
29	2007-12-09	2008-06-25	2008-12-25	2009-05-21	2008-05-25 [29/76°] Phoenix lander arrives
30	2009-10-26	2010-05-13	2010-11-12	2011-04-08	
31	2011-09-13	2012-03-30	2012-09-29	2013-02-23	2012-08-06 [31/150°] Curiosity Rover arrives
32	2013-07-31	2014-02-15	2014-08-17	2015-01-11	2014-09-22 [32/200°] MAVEN arrives 2014-09-24 [32/202°] Mars Orbiter Mission arrives
33	2015-06-18	2016-01-03	2016-07-04	2016-11-28	
34	2017-05-05	2017-11-20	2018-05-22	2018-10-16	2018-11-26 [34/295°] InSight lands
35	2019-03-23	2019-10-08	2020-04-08	2020-09-02	
36	2021-02-07	2021-08-25	2022-02-24	2022-07-21	2021-02-18 [36/5°] Perseverance lands
37	2022-12-26	2023-07-12	2024-01-12	2024-06-07	
38	2024-11-12	2025-05-29	2025-11-29	2026-04-25	
39	2026-09-30	2027-04-16	2027-10-17	2028-03-12	
40	2028-08-17	2029-03-03	2029-09-03	2030-01-28	

== Martian calendars ==
Long before mission control teams on Earth began scheduling work shifts according to the Martian sol while operating spacecraft on the surface of Mars, it was recognized that humans probably could adapt to this slightly longer diurnal period. This suggested that a calendar based on the sol and the Martian year might be a useful timekeeping system for astronomers in the short term and for explorers in the future. For most day-to-day activities on Earth, people do not use Julian days, as astronomers do, but the Gregorian calendar, which despite its various complications is quite useful. It allows for easy determination of whether one date is an anniversary of another, whether a date is in winter or spring, and what is the number of years between two dates. This is much less practical with Julian days count. For similar reasons, if it is ever necessary to schedule and co-ordinate activities on a large scale across the surface of Mars it would be necessary to agree on a calendar.

American astronomer Percival Lowell expressed the time of year on Mars in terms of Mars dates that were analogous to Gregorian dates, with 20 March, 21 June, 22 September, and 21 December marking the southward equinox, southern solstice, northward equinox, and northern solstice, respectively; Lowell's focus was on the southern hemisphere of Mars because it is the hemisphere that is more easily observed from Earth during favorable oppositions. Lowell's system was not a true calendar, since a Mars date could span nearly two entire sols; rather it was a convenient device for expressing the time of year in the southern hemisphere in lieu of heliocentric longitude, which would have been less comprehensible to a general readership.

Italian astronomer Mentore Maggini's 1939 book describes a calendar developed years earlier by American astronomers Andrew Ellicott Douglass and William H. Pickering, in which the first nine months contain 56 sols and the last three months contain 55 sols. Their calendar year begins with the northward equinox on 1 March, thus imitating the original Roman calendar. Other dates of astronomical significance are: northern solstice, 27 June; southward equinox, 36 September; southern solstice, 12 December; perihelion, 31 November; and aphelion, 31 May. Pickering's inclusion of Mars dates in a 1916 report of his observations may have been the first use of a Martian calendar in an astronomical publication. Maggini states: "These dates of the Martian calendar are frequently used by observatories...." Despite his claim, this system eventually fell into disuse, and in its place new systems were proposed periodically which likewise did not gain sufficient acceptance to take permanent hold.

In 1936, when the calendar reform movement was at its height, American astronomer Robert G. Aitken published an article outlining a Martian calendar. In each quarter there are three months of 42 sols and a fourth month of 41 sols. The pattern of seven-day weeks repeats over a two-year cycle, i.e., the calendar year always begins on a Sunday in odd-numbered years, thus effecting a perpetual calendar for Mars.

Whereas previous proposals for a Martian calendar had not included an epoch, American astronomer I. M. Levitt developed a more complete system in 1954. In fact, Ralph Mentzer, an acquaintance of Levitt's who was a watchmaker for the Hamilton Watch Company, built several clocks designed by Levitt to keep time on both Earth and Mars. They could also be set to display the date on both planets according to Levitt's calendar and epoch (the Julian day epoch of 4713 BCE).

Charles F. Capen included references to Mars dates in a 1966 Jet Propulsion Laboratory technical report associated with the Mariner 4 flyby of Mars. This system stretches the Gregorian calendar to fit the longer Martian year, much as Lowell had done in 1895, the difference being that 20 March, 21 June, 22 September, and 21 December marks the northward equinox, northern solstice, southward equinox, southern solstice, respectively. Similarly, Conway B. Leovy et al. also expressed time in terms of Mars dates in a 1973 paper describing results from the Mariner 9 Mars orbiter.

British astronomer Sir Patrick Moore described a Martian calendar of his own design in 1977. His idea was to divide up a Martian year into 18 months. Months 6, 12 and 18, have 38 sols, while the rest of the months contain 37 sols.

American aerospace engineer and political scientist Thomas Gangale first published regarding the Darian calendar in 1986, with additional details published in 1998 and 2006. It has 24 months to accommodate the longer Martian year while keeping the notion of a "month" that is reasonably similar to the length of an Earth month. On Mars, a "month" would have no relation to the orbital period of any moon of Mars, since Phobos and Deimos orbit in about 7 hours and 30 hours respectively. However, Earth and Moon would generally be visible to the naked eye when they were above the horizon at night, and the time it takes for the Moon to move from maximum separation in one direction to the other and back as seen from Mars is close to a Lunar month.

Czech astronomer Josef Šurán offered a Martian calendar design in 1997, in which a common year has 672 Martian days distributed into 24 months of 28 days (or 4 weeks of 7 days each); in skip years, the week at the end of the twelfth month is omitted.

Dutch computer programmer Gert-Jan "GJ" Schouten proposed the Lukashian Calendar at the 28th convention of the Mars Society in 2025. It provides a universal mechanism, where durations of days and years are variable, in order to accurately match each individual solar day and year and the Sun will never run faster or slower than the Lukashian clock. This is especially relevant for Mars, where the Sun can run up to 51 minutes slower than a Martian clock with fixed-duration days. Different instances of the Lukashian Calendar can be created for any celestial body with a human settlement. The Mars instance uses the durations of Martian sols and years, whereas the Earth instance uses those of Earth days and years. This allows analog missions on Earth to use the same calendar mechanism as a potential settlement on Mars. The Lukashian Calendar has a technical implementation under an open source license.

Another Martian calendar proposal, based on 22-year cycle of interleaving 668- and 669-sol years with final year of 670-sol duration and reusing Earth names for months and weekdays, was published in Journal of British Interplanetary Society in 2025, by Dennis Silin, and made available as a Python package under open-source license.

Comparison of Mars calendar proposals
Proposal	Months	Weeks	Perennial?	Leap system	Length of year	Start of year	Epoch	Ref
Douglass & Pickering (<1939)	12 (56 or 55 sols)				669 sols	northward equinox		
Aitken (1936)	16 (42 or 41 sols)	95 or 96 (7 sol)	2-year		668 sols			
Levitt (1954)	12 (56 or 55 sols)			sol	668 or 669 sols		4713 BCE	
Moore (1977)	18 (38 or 37 sols)				669 sols			
Gangale (1986): Darian Calendar	24 (28 or 27 sols)	96 (7 or 6 sol)	Yes	sol	668 or 669 sols	northward equinox	1609; year 0 = Mars Year -183	
Šurán (1997)	24 (21 or 28 sols)	95 or 96 (7 sol)	Yes	week	672 or 665 sols			
Lukashian (2018)	none	67 (10 sol + final week of 8 or 9 sols)	Yes	not needed	668 or 669 sols	southern solstice	27 April 1947	
Silin (2025)	12 (56 or 52-54 sols)	96 (7 sol + final week of 3-5 sols)	Yes	sol	668, 669 or 670 sols	northward equinox	1955	

=== Moore's 37-sol period ===
37 sols is the smallest integer number of sols after which the Mars Sol Date and the Julian date become offset by a full day. Alternatively, it can be viewed as the smallest integer number of sols needed for any Martian time zones to complete a full lap around Earth time zones. Specifically, 37 sols are equal to 38 Earth days plus 24 minutes 44 seconds.

Remarkably, the 37-sol period also accidentally almost divides several time quantities of interest at the same time. In particular:

- One Martian year is approximately equal to 18 × (37 sols) + 2.59897 sols
- Two Earth-Mars synodic periods are approximately equal to 41 × (37 sols) + 1.176 sols
- One Earth decade is approximately equal to 96 × (37 sols) + 2.7018 sols

This makes the 37-sol period useful both for time synchronization between Earth and Mars timezones, and for Martian calendars, as a small number of leap sols can be straightforwardly added to eliminate calendar drift with respect to either the Martian year, Earth-Mars launch windows, or Earth calendars.

== Martian time in fiction ==
The first known reference to time on Mars appears in the novel Across the Zodiac by the English writer Percy Greg (1880). The primary, secondary, tertiary, and quaternary divisions of the sol are based on the number 12. Sols are numbered 0 through the end of the year, with no additional structure to the calendar. The epoch is "the union of all races and nations in a single State, a union which was formally established 13,218 years ago".

=== 20th century ===
Edgar Rice Burroughs described, in The Gods of Mars (1913), the divisions of the sol into zodes, xats, and tals. Although possibly the first to make the mistake of describing the Martian year as lasting 687 Martian days, he was far from the last.

In the Robert A. Heinlein novel Red Planet (1949), humans living on Mars use a 24-month calendar, alternating between familiar Earth months and newly created months such as Ceres and Zeus. For example, Ceres comes after March and before April, while Zeus comes after October and before November.

The Arthur C. Clarke novel The Sands of Mars (1951) mentions in passing that "Monday followed Sunday in the usual way" and "the months also had the same names, but were fifty to sixty days in length".

In H. Beam Piper's short story "Omnilingual" (1957), the Martian calendar and the periodic table are the keys to archaeologists' deciphering of the records left by the long dead Martian civilization.

Kurt Vonnegut's novel The Sirens of Titan (1959) describes a Martian calendar divided into twenty-one months: "twelve with thirty days, and nine with thirty-one", for a total of only 639 sols.

D. G. Compton states in his novel Farewell, Earth's Bliss (1966), during the prison ship's journey to Mars: "Nobody on board had any real idea how the people in the settlement would have organised their six-hundred-and-eighty-seven-day year."

In Ian McDonald's Desolation Road (1988), set on a terraformed Mars (referred to by the book's characters as "Ares"), characters follow an implied 24-month calendar whose months are portmanteaus of Gregorian months, such as "Julaugust", "Augtember", and "Novodecember".

In both Philip K. Dick's novel Martian Time-Slip (1964) and Kim Stanley Robinson's Mars Trilogy (1992–1996), clocks retain Earth-standard seconds, minutes, and hours, but freeze at midnight for 39.5 minutes. As the fictional colonization of Mars progresses, this "timeslip" becomes a sort of witching hour, a time when inhibitions can be shed, and the emerging identity of Mars as a separate entity from Earth is celebrated. (It is not said explicitly whether this occurs simultaneously all over Mars, or at local midnight in each longitude.) Also in the Mars Trilogy, the calendar year is divided into twenty-four months. The names of the months are the same as the Gregorian calendar, except for a "1" or "2" in front to indicate the first or second occurrence of that month (for example, 1 January, 2 January, 1 February, 2 February).

=== 21st century ===
In the manga and anime series Aria (2001–2002), by Kozue Amano, set on a terraformed Mars, the calendar year is also divided into twenty-four months. Following the modern Japanese calendar, the months are not named but numbered sequentially, running from 1st Month to 24th Month.

The Darian calendar is mentioned in several works of fiction set on Mars:

- Star Trek: Department of Temporal Investigations: Watching the Clock by Christopher L. Bennett, Pocket Books/Star Trek (April 26, 2011)
- The Quantum Thief by Hannu Rajaniemi, Tor Books; Reprint edition (May 10, 2011)
- Thin Air by Richard K. Morgan, Del Rey Books, October 2018.
- Black Helicopters by Caitlín R. Kiernan, Tor Books, 2018

In Andy Weir's novel The Martian (2011) and its 2015 feature film adaptation, sols are counted and referenced frequently with onscreen title cards, in order to emphasize the amount of time the main character spends on Mars.

In Season 4 of For All Mankind, which is set in large part on a Mars base, there are wristwatches set to "Mars time" much the same way as are currently used among the staff of robotic Mars missions.

== Formulas to compute MSD and MTC ==
The Mars Sol Date (MSD) can be computed from the Julian date referred to Terrestrial Time (TT), as:

$$\mathrm{MSD} = \frac{\mathrm{JD}_\mathrm{TT} - 2405522.0028779 }{ 1.0274912517}$$

Terrestrial time, however, is not as easily available as Coordinated Universal Time (UTC). TT can be computed from UTC by first adding the difference TAI − UTC, which is a positive integer number of seconds occasionally updated by the introduction of leap seconds (see current number of leap seconds), then adding the constant difference TT − TAI = 32.184 s. This leads to the following formula giving MSD from the UTC-referred Julian date:

$$\mathrm{MSD} = \frac{\mathrm{JD}_\mathrm{UTC} + \frac{\mathrm{TAI} - \mathrm{UTC}}{86400} - 2405522.0025054} {1.0274912517}$$

where the difference TAI − UTC is in seconds. JD_{UTC} can in turn be computed from any epoch-based time stamp, by adding the Julian date of the epoch to the time stamp in days. For example, if t is a Unix timestamp in seconds, then:

$$\mathrm{JD}_\mathrm{UTC} = \frac{t}{86400} + 2440587.5$$

It follows, by a simple substitution:

$$\mathrm{MSD} = \frac{t + (\mathrm{TAI} - \mathrm{UTC})} {88775.244147} + 34127.2954262$$

MTC is the fractional part of MSD, in hours, minutes and seconds:

$$\mathrm{MTC} = (\mathrm{MSD} \mod 1) \times 24\,\mathrm{h}$$

For example, at the time this page was last generated (17 Nov 2026, 18:31:33 UTC):

- JD_{TT} = 2461362.27271
- MSD = 54346.22411
- MTC = 05:22:43

== See also ==
- Astronomy on Mars
- Universal Time
- Coordinated Universal Time
