= Spirit (rover) =

NASA Mars rover, active from 2004 to 2010

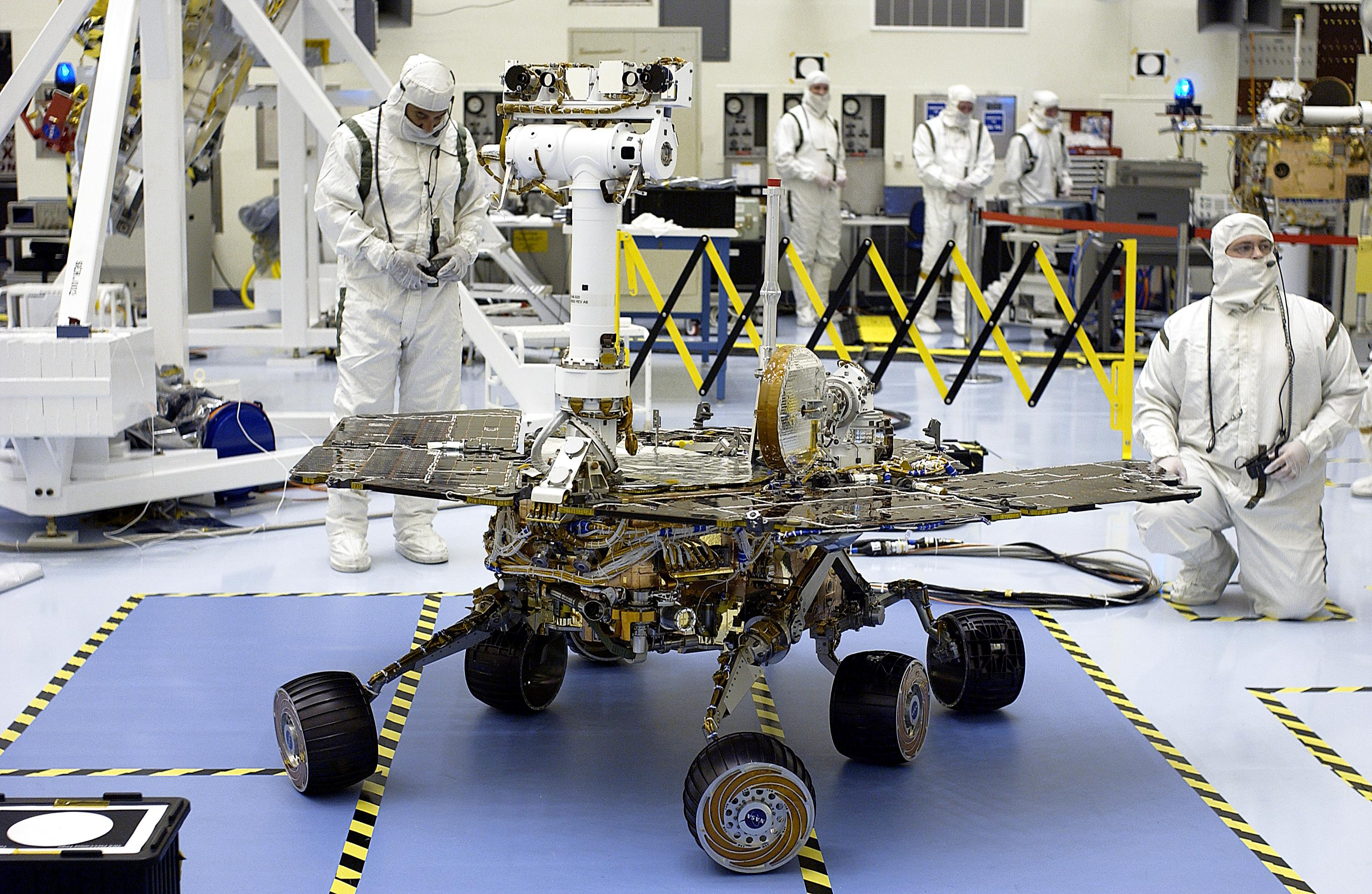
- The Mars Exploration Rover-2 (MER-2) during testing for mobility and maneuverability
- Mission type: Mars rover
- Operator: NASA
- COSPAR ID: 2003-027A
- SATCAT no.: 27827
- Website: Mars Exploration Rover
- Mission duration: Planned: 90 sols (~92 days); Actual: 2,208 sols (2,269 days), landing to final contact; Mobile: 1,892 sols (1,944 days), landing to final embedding; Total: 2,623 sols (2,695 days), landing to mission end

Spacecraft properties
- Dry mass: 185 kilograms (408 lb)
- Power: Solar panels: 140 W

Start of mission
- Launch date: June 10, 2003, 17:58:47 UTC
- Rocket: Delta II 7925-9.5
- Launch site: Cape Canaveral SLC-17A
- Contractor: Boeing

End of mission
- Declared: May 25, 2011
- Last contact: March 22, 2010

Mars rover
- Landing date: January 4, 2004, 04:35 UTC SCET; MSD 46216 03:35 AMT
- Landing site: Gusev Crater; 14.5684°S 175.472636°E
- Distance driven: 7.73 km (4.8 mi)
- Spirit mission patch, featuring Marvin the Martian Mars Exploration Program NASA Mars rovers

Spirit, also known as MER-A (Mars Exploration Rover – A) or MER-2, is a Mars robotic rover, active from 2004 to 2010. Spirit was operational on Mars for 2208 sols or 3.3 Martian years (2269 days; 6 years, 77 days). It was one of two rovers of NASA's Mars Exploration Rover Mission managed by the Jet Propulsion Laboratory (JPL). Spirit landed successfully within the impact crater Gusev on Mars at 04:35 Ground UTC on January 4, 2004, three weeks before its twin, Opportunity (MER-B), which landed on the other side of the planet. Its name was chosen through a NASA-sponsored student essay competition. The rover got stuck in a "sand trap" in late 2009 at an angle that hampered recharging of its batteries; its last communication with Earth was on March 22, 2010.

The rover completed its planned 90-sol mission (slightly less than 92.5 Earth days). Aided by cleaning events that resulted in more energy from its solar panels, Spirit went on to function effectively over twenty times longer than NASA planners expected. Spirit also logged 7.73 km (4.8 mi) of driving instead of the planned 600 m (0.4 mi), allowing more extensive geological analysis of Martian rocks and planetary surface features. Initial scientific results from the first phase of the mission (the 90-sol prime mission) were published in a special issue of the journal Science.

On May 1, 2009 (5 years, 3 months, 27 Earth days after landing; 21 times the planned mission duration), Spirit became stuck in soft sand. This was not the first of the mission's "embedding events" and for the following eight months NASA carefully analyzed the situation, running Earth-based theoretical and practical simulations, and finally programming the rover to make extrication drives in an attempt to free itself. These efforts continued until January 26, 2010, when NASA officials announced that the rover was likely irrecoverably obstructed by its location in soft sand, though it continued to perform scientific research from its current location.

The rover continued in a stationary science platform role until communication with Spirit stopped on March 22, 2010 (sol 2208). JPL continued to attempt to regain contact until May 24, 2011, when NASA announced that efforts to communicate with the unresponsive rover had ended, calling the mission complete. A formal farewell took place at NASA headquarters shortly thereafter.

== Objectives ==
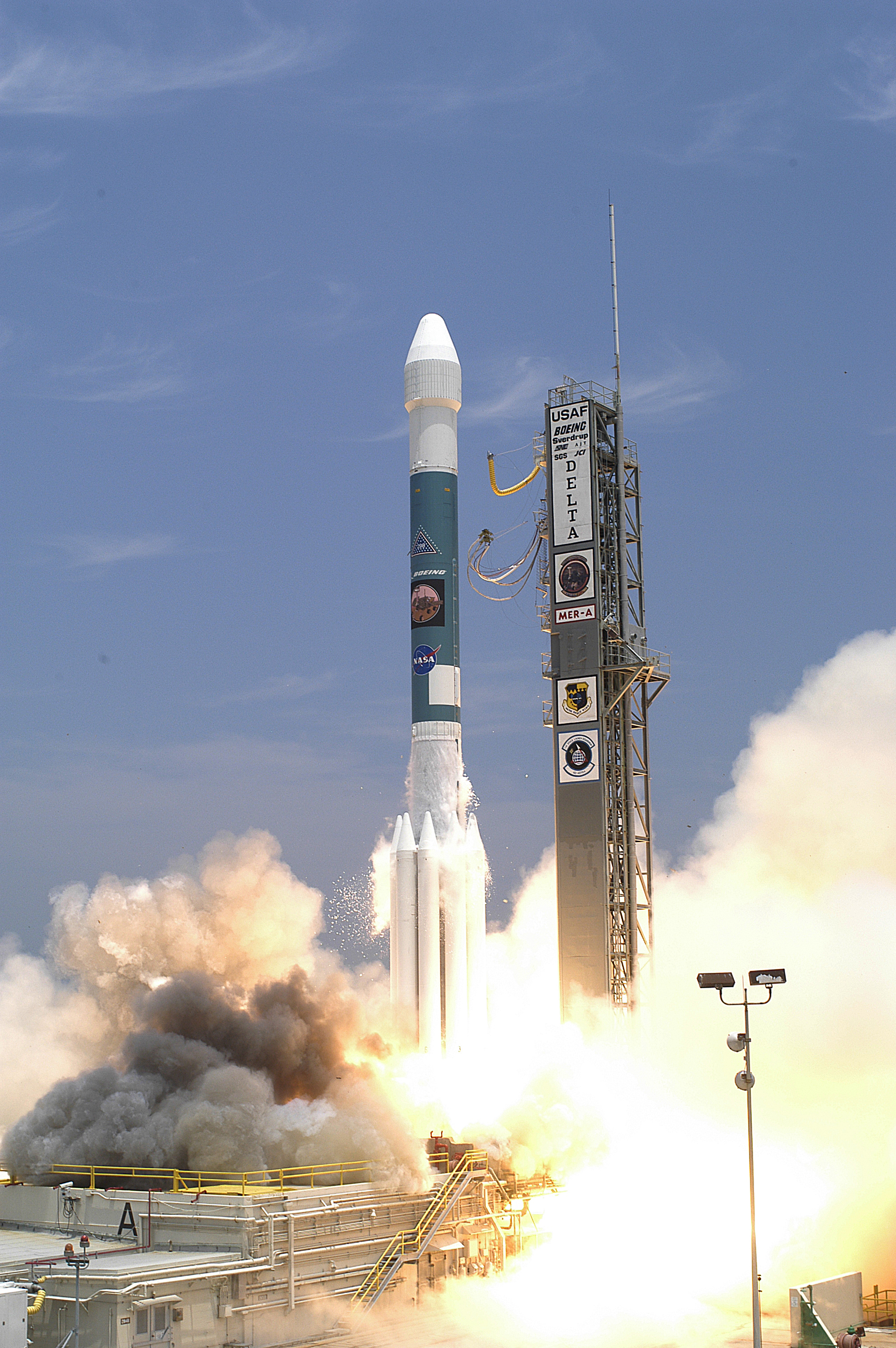
Delta II lifting off with MER-A on June 10, 2003

The scientific objectives of the Mars Exploration Rover mission were to:

- Search for and characterize a variety of rocks and soils that hold clues to past water activity. In particular, samples sought include those that have minerals deposited by water-related processes such as precipitation, evaporation, sedimentary cementation, or hydrothermal activity.
- Determine the distribution and composition of minerals, rocks, and soils surrounding the landing sites.
- Determine what geologic processes have shaped the local terrain and influenced the chemistry. Such processes could include water or wind erosion, sedimentation, hydrothermal mechanisms, volcanism, and cratering.
- Perform calibration and validation of surface observations made by Mars Reconnaissance Orbiter (MRO) instruments. This will help determine the accuracy and effectiveness of various instruments that survey Martian geology from orbit.
- Search for iron-containing minerals, and to identify and quantify relative amounts of specific mineral types that contain water or were formed in water, such as iron-bearing carbonates.
- Characterize the mineralogy and textures of rocks and soils to determine the processes that created them.
- Search for geological clues to the environmental conditions that existed when liquid water was present.
- Assess whether those environments were conducive to life.

== Mission timeline ==
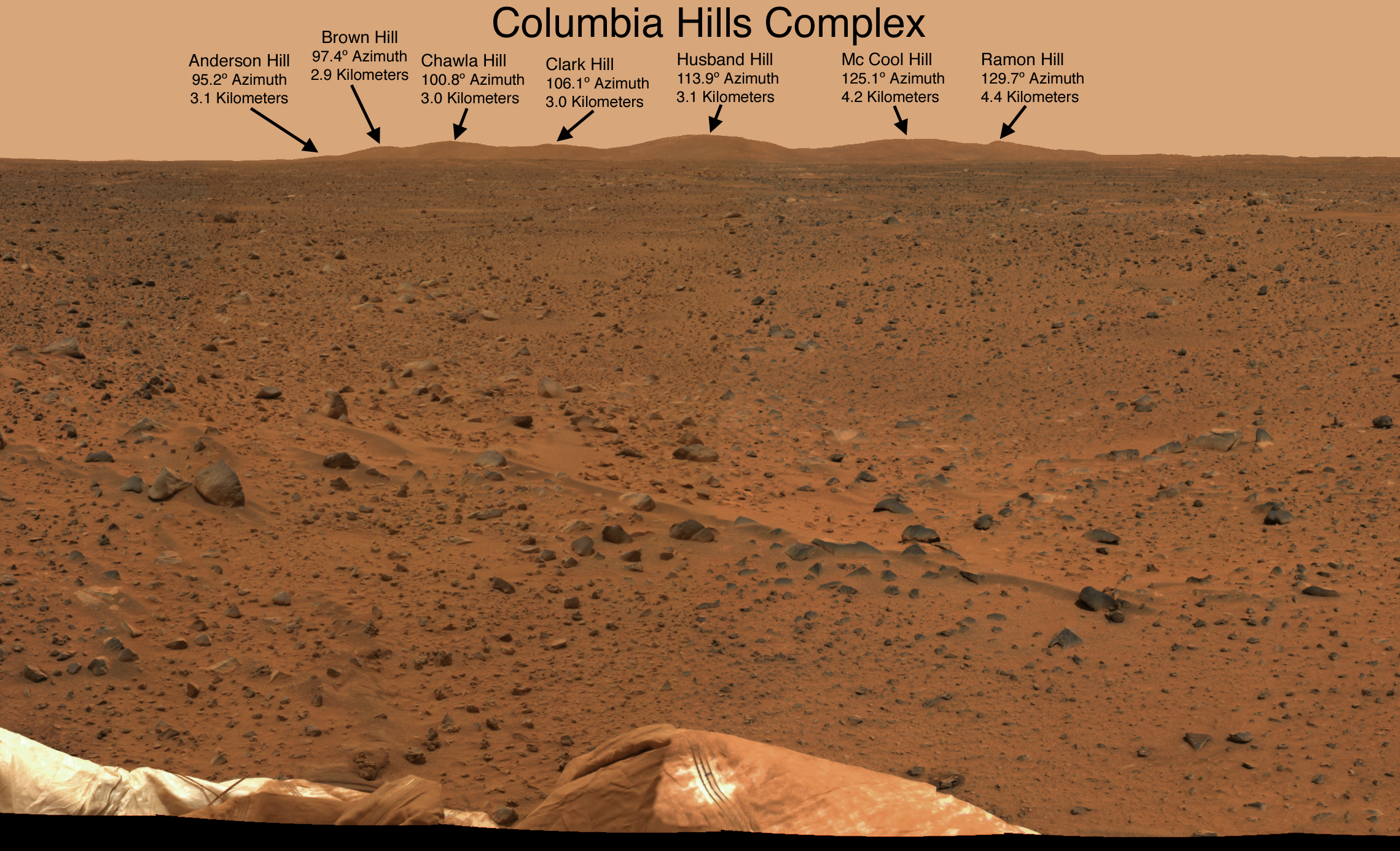
Annotated Columbia Hills panorama from the Spirit landing site

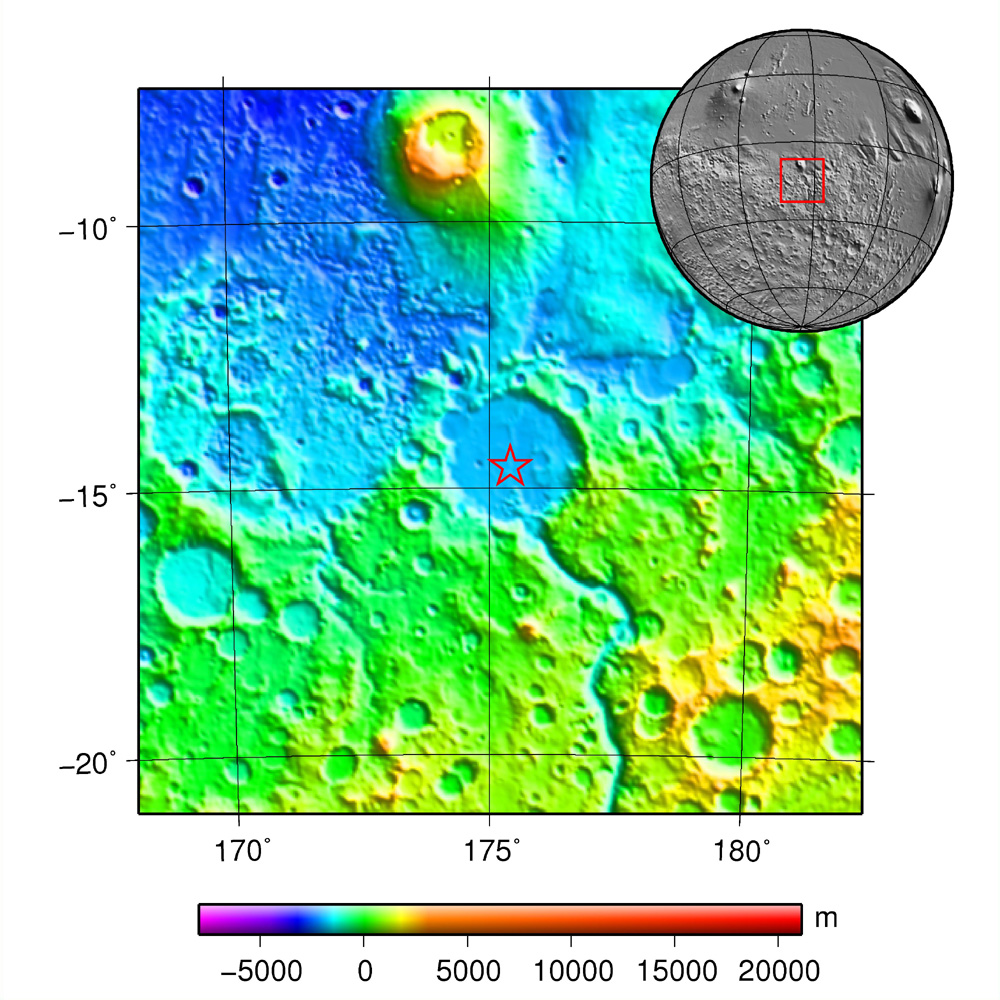
An overall view of MER-A Spirit landing site (denoted with a star)

Opportunity and Spirit rovers were part of the Mars Exploration Rover program in the long-term Mars Exploration Program. The Mars Exploration Program's four principal goals were to determine if the potential for life exists on Mars (in particular, whether recoverable water may be found on Mars), to characterize the Mars climate and its geology, and then to prepare for a potential human mission to Mars. The Mars Exploration Rovers were to travel across the Martian surface and perform periodic geologic analyses to determine if water ever existed on Mars as well as the types of minerals available, as well as to corroborate data taken by the Mars Reconnaissance Orbiter (MRO). Both rovers were designed with an expected 90 sols (92 Earth days) lifetime, but each lasted much longer than expected. Spirit's mission lasted 20 times longer than its expected lifetime, and its mission was declared ended on May 25, 2011, after it got stuck in soft sand and expended its power reserves trying to free itself. Opportunity lasted 55 times longer than its 90 sol planned lifetime, operating for 5498 days from landing to mission end. An archive of weekly updates on the rover's status can be found at the Opportunity Update Archive.

=== Launch and landing ===
Animation of Spirit orbit. Sun · Earth · Mars · Spirit

The MER-A (Spirit) and MER-B (Opportunity) were launched on June 10, 2003 and July 7, 2003, respectively. Though both probes launched on Boeing Delta II 7925-9.5 rockets from Cape Canaveral Space Launch Complex 17 (CCAFS SLC-17), MER-B was on the heavy version of that launch vehicle, needing the extra energy for Trans-Mars injection. The launch vehicles were integrated onto pads right next to each other, with MER-A on CCAFS SLC-17A and MER-B on CCAFS SLC-17B. The dual pads allowed for working the 15- and 21-day planetary launch periods close together; the last possible launch day for MER-A was June 19, 2003 and the first day for MER-B was June 25, 2003. NASA's Launch Services Program managed the launch of both spacecraft.

Spirit successfully landed on the surface of Mars on 04:35 Spacecraft Event Time (SCET) on January 4, 2004. This was the start of its 90-sol mission, but solar cell cleaning events would mean it was the start of a much longer mission, lasting until 2010. Spirit was targeted to a site that appears to have been affected by liquid water in the past, the crater Gusev, a possible former lake in a giant impact crater about 10 km (6.2 mi) from the center of the target ellipse at 14.5718°S 175.4785°E. After the airbag-protected landing craft settled onto the surface, the rover rolled out to take panoramic images. These give scientists the information they need to select promising geological targets and drive to those locations to perform on-site scientific investigations. The MER team named the landing site "Columbia Memorial Station," in honor of the seven astronauts killed in the Space Shuttle Columbia disaster.

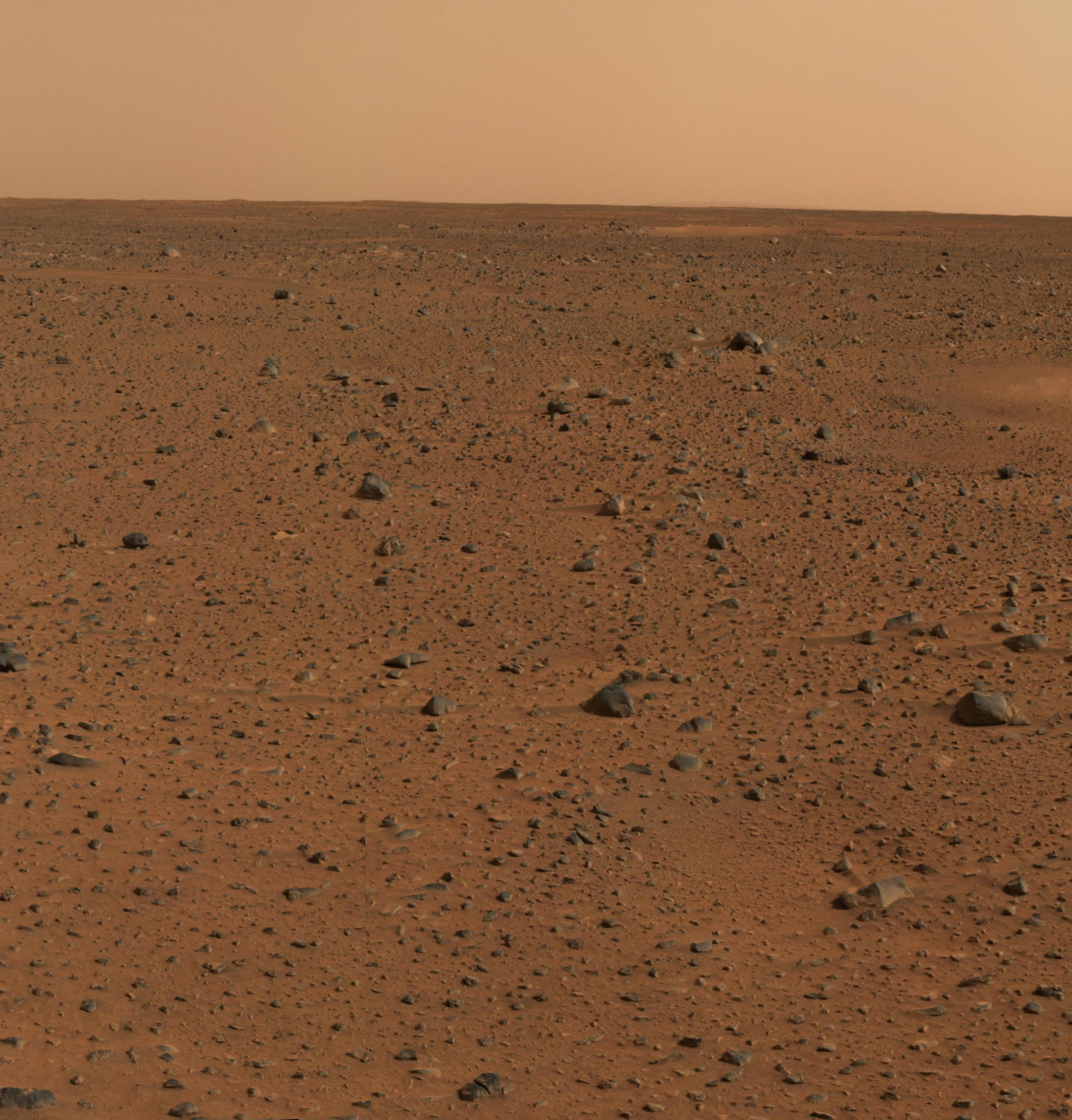
First color image compiled from images by Spirit; it was the highest resolution color image taken on another planet.

On May 1, 2009 (sol 1892), the rover became stuck in soft sand, the machine resting upon a cache of iron(III) sulfate (jarosite) hidden under a veneer of normal-looking soil. Iron sulfate has very little cohesion, making it difficult for the rover's wheels to gain traction.

On January 26, 2010 (sol 2155), after several months attempting to free the rover, NASA abandoned this attempt and instead changed the mission to use the mobile robot as a stationary research platform. Efforts were directed towards orienting it toward the Sun to recharge its batteries, to keep systems operational during the winter. On March 30, 2010, Spirit skipped a planned communication session and as anticipated from recent power-supply projections, had probably entered a low-power hibernation mode.

The last communication with the rover was March 22, 2010 (sol 2208) and there is a strong possibility the rover's batteries lost so much energy that the mission clock stopped. In previous winters the rover was able to park on a Sun-facing slope and keep its internal temperature above −40 °C (−40 °F), but since the rover was stuck on flat ground it is estimated that its internal temperature dropped to −55 °C (−67 °F). If Spirit had survived these conditions and there had been a cleaning event, there was a possibility that with the southern summer solstice in March 2011, solar energy would increase to a level that would wake up the rover. Spirit remains silent at its location, called "Troy," on the west side of Home Plate.

It is likely that Spirit experienced a low-power fault and had turned off all sub-systems, including communication, and had gone into a deep sleep, trying to recharge its batteries. It is also possible that the rover had experienced a mission clock fault. If that had happened, the rover would have lost track of time and tried to remain asleep until enough sunlight struck the solar arrays to wake it. This state is called "Solar Groovy." If the rover woke up from a mission clock fault, it would only listen. Starting on July 26, 2010 (sol 2331), a new procedure to address the possible mission clock fault was implemented but was unsuccessful.

=== End of mission ===
JPL continued attempts to regain contact with Spirit until May 25, 2011, when NASA announced the end of contact efforts and the completion of the mission. According to NASA, the rover likely experienced excessively cold "internal temperatures" due to "inadequate energy to run its survival heaters" that, in turn, was a result of "a stressful Martian winter without much sunlight." Many critical components and connections would have been "susceptible to damage from the cold." Assets that had been needed to support Spirit were transitioned to support Spirit's then still-active twin, Opportunity.

The primary surface mission for Spirit was planned to last at least 90 sols. The mission received several extensions and lasted about 2,208 sols. On August 11, 2007, Spirit obtained the second longest operational duration on the surface of Mars for a lander or rover at 1282 Sols, one sol longer than the Viking 2 lander. Viking 2 was powered by a nuclear cell whereas Spirit is powered by solar arrays. Until Opportunity overtook it on May 19, 2010, the Mars probe with longest operational period was Viking 1 that lasted for 2245 Sols on the surface of Mars. On March 22, 2010, Spirit sent its last communication, thus falling just over a month short of surpassing Viking 1's operational record. An archive of weekly updates on the rover's status can be found at the Spirit Update Archive.

Spirit's total odometry is 7,730.50 meters (4.80 mi).

== Design and construction ==
Annotated rover diagram

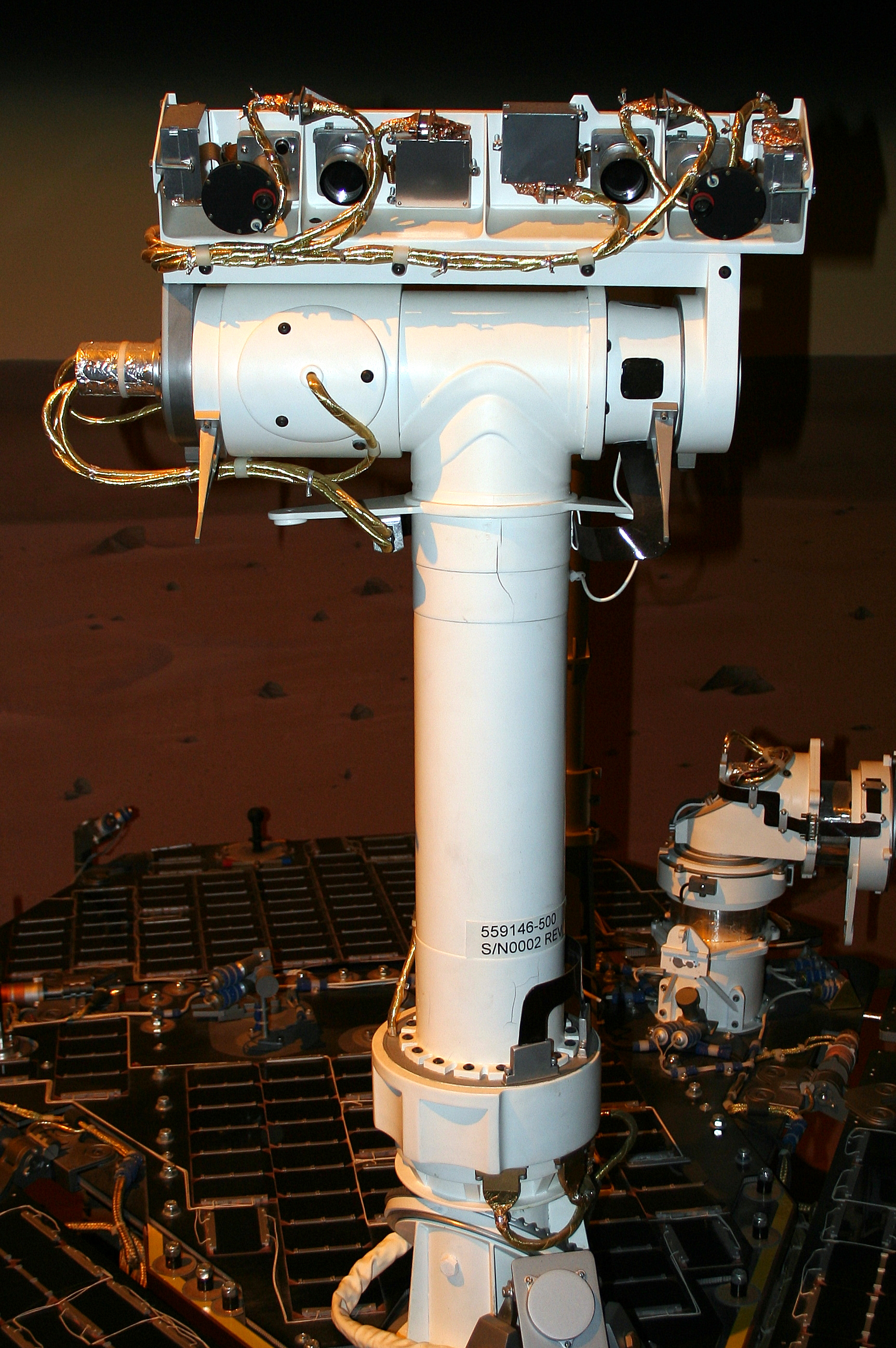
Pancam Mast Assembly (PMA)

Spirit (and its twin, Opportunity) are six-wheeled, solar-powered robots standing 1.5 meters (4.9 ft) high, 2.3 meters (7.5 ft) wide and 1.6 meters (5.2 ft) long and weighing 180 kilograms (400 lb). Six wheels on a rocker-bogie system enabled mobility over rough terrain. Each wheel had its own motor. The vehicle was steered at front and rear and was designed to operate safely at tilts of up to 30 degrees. The maximum speed was 5 centimeters per second (2.0 in/s); 0.18 kilometers per hour (0.11 mph), although the average speed was about 1 centimeter per second (0.39 in/s). Both Spirit and Opportunity have pieces of the fallen World Trade Center's metal on them that were "turned into shields to protect cables on the drilling mechanisms".

Solar arrays generated about 140 watts for up to fourteen hours per sol, while rechargeable lithium ion batteries stored energy for use at night. Spirit's onboard computer uses a 20 MHz RAD6000 CPU with 128 MB of DRAM and 3 MB of EEPROM. The rover's operating temperature ranges from −40 to +40 °C (−40 to 104 °F) and radioisotope heaters provide a base level of heating, assisted by electrical heaters when necessary.

Communications depended on an omnidirectional low-gain antenna communicating at a low data rate and a steerable high-gain antenna, both in direct contact with Earth. A low-gain antenna was also used to relay data to spacecraft orbiting Mars.

=== Science payload ===
The science instruments included:

- Panoramic Camera (Pancam) – examined the texture, color, mineralogy, and structure of the local terrain.
- Navigation Camera (Navcam) – monochrome with a higher field of view but lower resolution, for navigation and driving.
- Miniature Thermal Emission Spectrometer (Mini-TES) – identified promising rocks and soils for closer examination, and determined the processes that formed them.
- Hazcams, two B&W cameras with 120 degree field of view, that provided additional data about the rover's surroundings.

The rover arm held the following instruments:

- Mössbauer spectrometer (MB) MIMOS II – used for close-up investigations of the mineralogy of iron-bearing rocks and soils.
- Alpha particle X-ray spectrometer (APXS) – close-up analysis of the abundances of elements that make up rocks and soils.
- Magnets – for collecting magnetic dust particles.
- Microscopic Imager (MI) – obtained close-up, high-resolution images of rocks and soils.
- Rock Abrasion Tool (RAT) – exposed fresh material for examination by instruments on board.

Spirit was 'driven' by several operators throughout its mission.

=== Power ===
The rover uses a combination of solar cells and a rechargeable chemical battery. This class of rover has two rechargeable lithium batteries, each composed of 8 cells with 8 Ah capacity. At the start of the mission the solar panels could provide up to around 900 watt-hours (Wh) per day to recharge the battery and power system in one Sol, but this could vary due to a variety of factors. In Eagle crater the cells were producing about 840 Wh per day, but by Sol 319 in December 2004, it had dropped to 730 Wh per day.

Like Earth, Mars has seasonal variations that reduce sunlight during winter. However, since the Martian year is longer than that of the Earth, the seasons fully rotate roughly once every 2 Earth years. By 2016, MER-B had endured seven Martian winters, during which times power levels drop which can mean the rover avoids doing activities that use a lot of power. During its first winter power levels dropped to under 300 Wh per day for two months, but some later winters were not as bad.

Another factor that can reduce received power is dust in the atmosphere, especially dust storms. Dust storms have occurred quite frequently when Mars is closest to the Sun. Global dust storms in 2007 reduced power levels for Opportunity and Spirit so much they could only run for a few minutes each day. Due to the 2018 dust storms on Mars, Opportunity entered hibernation mode on June 12, but it remained silent after the storm subsided in early October.

== Discoveries ==
The rocks on the plains of Gusev are a type of basalt. They contain the minerals olivine, pyroxene, plagioclase and magnetite. They look like volcanic basalt, as they are fine-grained with irregular holes (geologists would say they have vesicles and vugs).

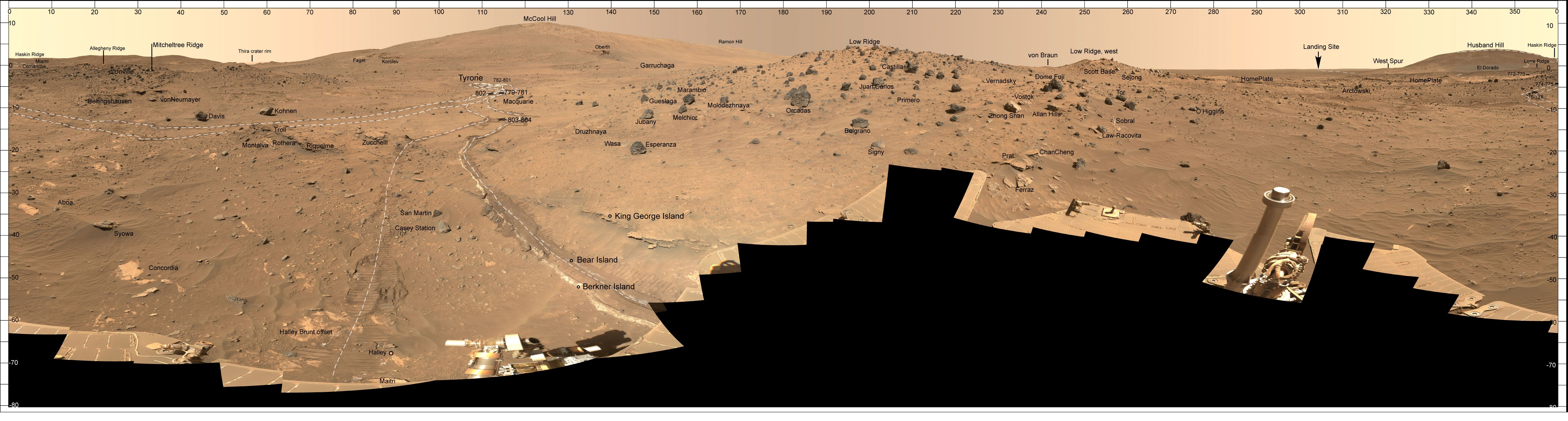
Annotated panorama of rocks near Spirit (April, 2006)

Much of the soil on the plains came from the breakdown of the local rocks. Fairly high levels of nickel were found in some soils; probably from meteorites.

Analysis shows that the rocks have been slightly altered by tiny amounts of water. Outside coatings and cracks inside the rocks suggest water deposited minerals, maybe bromine compounds. All the rocks contain a fine coating of dust and one or more harder rinds of material. One type can be brushed off, while another needed to be ground off by the Rock Abrasion Tool (RAT).

The dust in Gusev Crater is the same as dust all around the planet. All the dust was found to be magnetic. Moreover, Spirit found the magnetism was caused by the mineral magnetite, especially magnetite that contained the element titanium. One magnet was able to completely divert all dust, hence all Martian dust is thought to be magnetic. The spectra of the dust was similar to spectra of bright, low thermal inertia regions like Tharsis and Arabia that have been detected by orbiting satellites. A thin layer of dust, maybe less than one millimeter thick, covers all surfaces. Something in it contains a small amount of chemically bound water.

== Astronomy ==
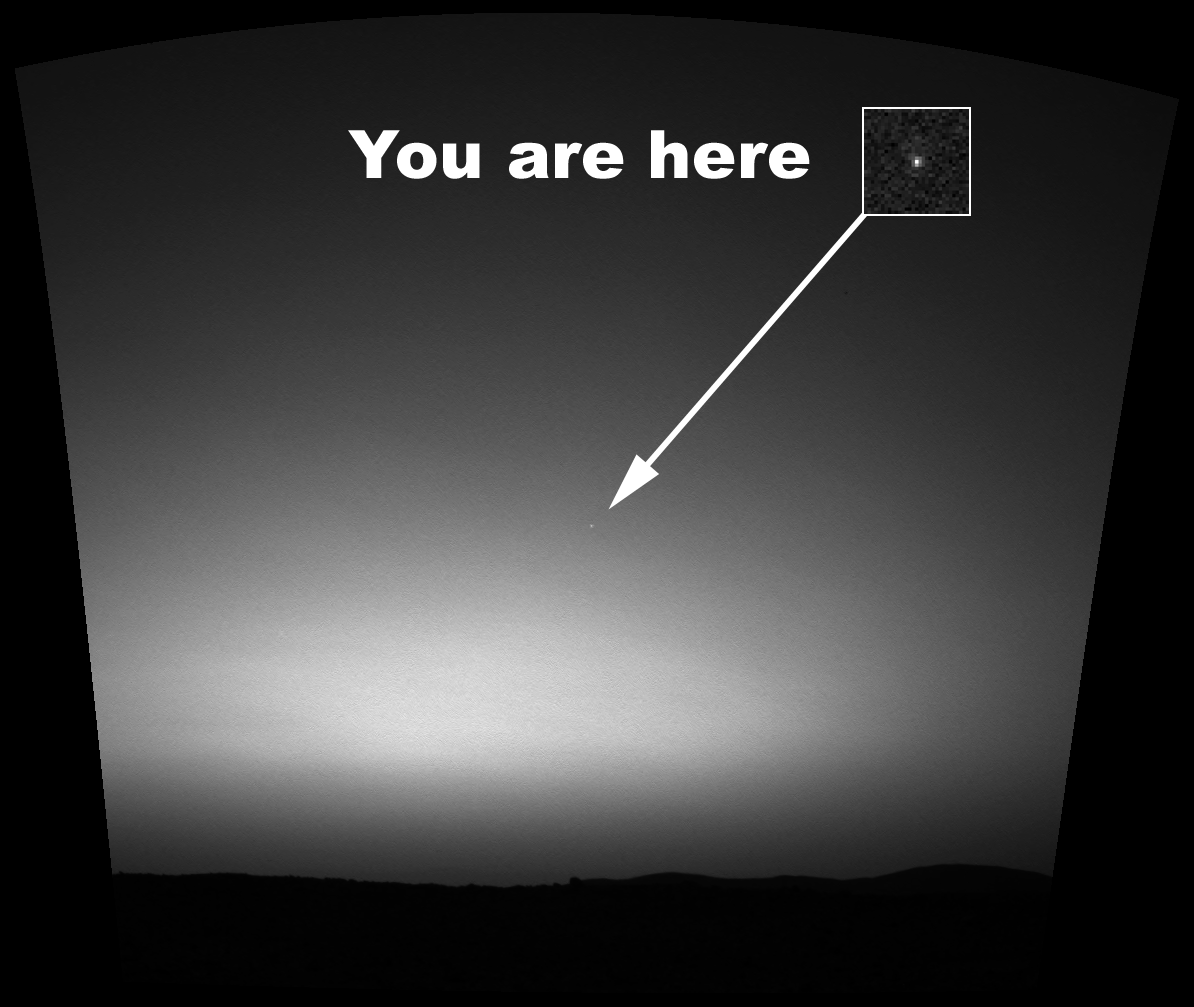
Earth from Mars

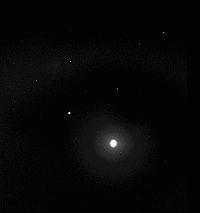
Night sky of Mars showing Deimos (left) and Phobos (right) in front of Sagittarius, as seen by Mars Exploration Rover Spirit on August 26, 2005. For full animation, see Image:Phobos & Deimos full.gif.

Spirit pointed its cameras towards the sky and observed a transit of the Sun by Mars's moon Deimos (see Transit of Deimos from Mars). It also took the first photo of Earth from the surface of another planet in early March 2004.

In late 2005, Spirit took advantage of a favorable energy situation to make multiple nighttime observations of both of Mars's moons Phobos and Deimos. These observations included a "lunar" (or rather phobian) eclipse as Spirit watched Phobos disappear into Mars's shadow. Some of Spirit's star gazing was designed to look for a predicted meteor shower caused by Halley's Comet, and although at least four imaged streaks were suspect meteors, they could not be unambiguously differentiated from those caused by cosmic rays.

A transit of Mercury from Mars took place on January 12, 2005, from about 14:45 UTC to 23:05 UTC. Theoretically, this could have been observed by both Spirit and Opportunity; however, camera resolution did not permit seeing Mercury's 6.1" angular diameter. They were able to observe transits of Deimos across the Sun, but at 2' angular diameter, Deimos is about 20 times larger than Mercury's 6.1" angular diameter. Ephemeris data generated by JPL Horizons indicates that Opportunity would have been able to observe the transit from the start until local sunset at about 19:23 UTC Earth time, while Spirit would have been able to observe it from local sunrise at about 19:38 UTC until the end of the transit.

== Equipment wear and failures ==
Both rovers passed their original mission time of 90 sols many times over. The extended time on the surface, and therefore additional stress on components, resulted in some issues developing.

On March 13, 2006 (sol 778), the right front wheel ceased working after having covered 7 km (4.2 mi) on Mars. Engineers began driving the rover backwards, dragging the dead wheel. Although this resulted in changes to driving techniques, the dragging effect became a useful tool, partially clearing away soil on the surface as the rover traveled, thus allowing areas to be imaged that would normally be inaccessible. However, in mid-December 2009, to the surprise of the engineers, the right front wheel showed slight movement in a wheel-test on sol 2113 and clearly rotated with normal resistance on three of four wheel-tests on sol 2117, but stalled on the fourth. On November 29, 2009 (sol 2098), the right rear wheel also stalled and remained inoperable for the remainder of the mission.

Scientific instruments also experienced degradation as a result of exposure to the harsh Martian environment and use over a far longer period than had been anticipated by the mission planners. Over time, the diamond in the resin grinding surface of the Rock Abrasion Tool wore down, after that the device could only be used to brush targets. All of the other science instruments and engineering cameras continued to function until contact was lost; however, towards the end of Spirit's life, the MIMOS II Mössbauer spectrometer took much longer to produce results than it did earlier in the mission because of the decay of its cobalt-57 gamma ray source that has a half life of 271 days.

== Legacy and honors ==
To commemorate Spirit's great contribution to the exploration of Mars, the asteroid 37452 Spirit has been named after it. The name was proposed by Ingrid van Houten-Groeneveld who along with Cornelis Johannes van Houten and Tom Gehrels discovered the asteroid on September 24, 1960.

To honor the rover, the JPL team named an area near Endeavour Crater explored by the Opportunity rover, 'Spirit Point'.

The 2022 documentary film, Good Night Oppy, about Opportunity, Spirit, and their long missions, was directed by Ryan White, and included support from JPL and Industrial Light & Magic.

== Gallery ==
The rover could take pictures with its different cameras, but only the PanCam camera had the ability to photograph a scene with different color filters. The panorama views were usually built up from PanCam images. Spirit transferred 128,224 pictures in its lifetime.

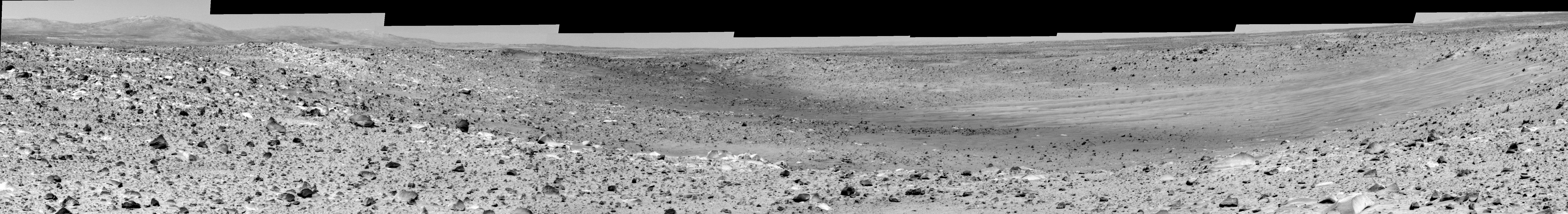
Missoula Crater (Sol 105, April 19, 2004)
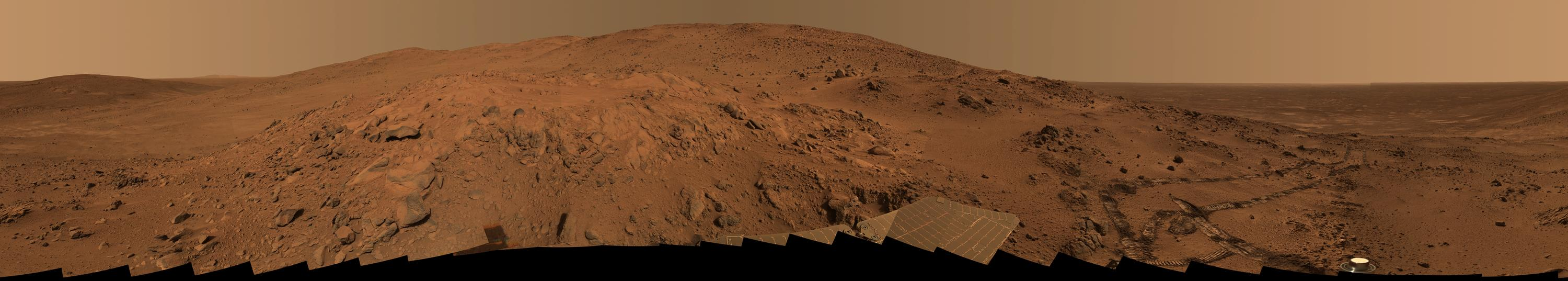
Color panorama taken from "Larry's Lookout". On the far left is "Tennessee Valley" and on the right, rover tracks.
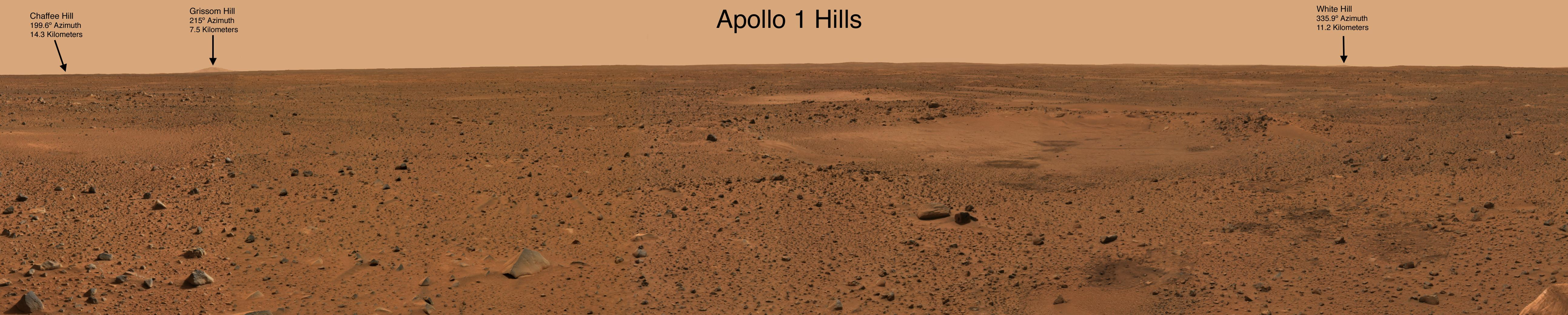
Annotated Apollo Hills panorama from the Spirit landing site

== See also ==
- Aeolis quadrangle
- Composition of Mars
- Curiosity rover
- ExoMars
- Exploration of Mars
- InSight
- Life on Mars
- List of surface features of Mars visited by Spirit and Opportunity
- Mars 2020 rover mission
- Opportunity rover
- Perseverance rover
- Scientific information from the Mars Exploration Rover mission
- Viking program
- List of software bugs related to space exploration
- Comparison of embedded computer systems on board the Mars rovers
- Zhurong (rover)
