= MIMOS II =

Spectrometer

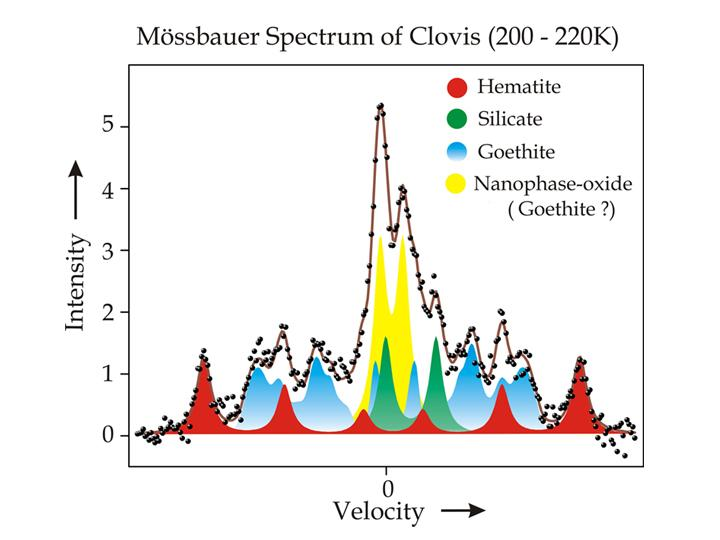
Spectrum obtained by Spirit in the Gusev crater

MIMOS II is the miniaturised Mössbauer spectrometer, developed by Dr. Göstar Klingelhöfer at the Johannes Gutenberg University in Mainz, Germany, that is used on the Mars Exploration Rovers Spirit and Opportunity for close-up investigations on the Martian surface of the mineralogy of iron-bearing rocks and soils.

MIMOS II uses a Cobalt-57 gamma ray source of about 300 mCi at launch which gave a 6-12 hr time for acquisition of a standard MB spectrum during the primary mission on Mars, depending on total Fe content and which Fe-bearing phases are present. Cobalt-57 has a half-life of only 271.8 days.

The MIMOS II sensorheads used snMars are approx 9 cm x 5 cm x 4 cm and weight of about 400g.

The MIMOS II system also includes a circuit board of about 100g.
