= Mars sol =

Solar day: unit of time on Mars

Sunrise on Mars

Sunset on Mars

Images captured by InSight

Sol (borrowed from the Latin word for sun) is a solar day on Mars; that is, a Mars-day. A sol is the apparent interval between two successive returns of the Sun to the same meridian (sundial time) as seen by an observer on Mars. It is one of several units for timekeeping on Mars.

A sol is slightly longer than an Earth day. It is approximately 24 hours, 39 minutes, 35 seconds long. A Martian year is approximately 668.6 sols, equivalent to approximately 687 Earth days or 1.88 Earth years.

The sol was adopted in 1976 during the Viking Lander missions and is a measure of time mainly used by NASA when, for example, scheduling the use of a Mars rover.

== Length ==
The average duration of the day-night cycle on Mars—i.e., a Martian day—is 24 hours, 39 minutes and 35.244 seconds, equivalent to 1.02749125 Earth days. The sidereal rotational period of Mars—its rotation compared to the fixed stars—is 24 hours, 37 minutes and 22.66 seconds. The solar day lasts longer because Mars's rotation is the same direction as its orbital motion.

== Usage in Mars lander timekeeping ==
Transit of Deimos from Mars, as captured by the Mars rover Perseverance on sol 1037 of its mission (20 January 2024 UTC).

When a NASA spacecraft lander begins operations on Mars, the passing Martian days (sols) have been tracked using a simple numerical count. The two Viking landers, Mars Phoenix, Mars Science Laboratory rover Curiosity, InSight, and Perseverance rover projects all counted the sol of touchdown as "Sol 0". Mars Pathfinder and the two Mars Exploration Rovers instead defined touchdown as "Sol 1". Generally speaking, the choice between counting from Sol 0 or Sol 1 has been made so that Sol 1 would be the first sol with "meaningful" or "useful" lander operations. Thus, landers that touched down late in the Martian day have begun their sol count at 0, while those that touch down early in the day began their count at 1.

Although NASA lander missions to Mars have twice occurred in pairs, no effort was made to synchronize the sol counts of the two landers within each pair. Thus, for example, although Spirit and Opportunity were sent to operate simultaneously on Mars, each counted its landing date as "Sol 1", putting their calendars approximately 21 sols out of sync.

== Terminology ==
The word yestersol was coined by the NASA Mars operations team early during the MER mission to refer to the previous sol (the Mars version of yesterday), and came into fairly wide use within that organization during the Mars Exploration Rover Mission of 2003. It was eventually picked up and used by the press. Other neologisms include tosol (for today on Mars), as well as one of three Mars versions of tomorrow: nextersol, morrowsol, or solmorrow. NASA planners coined the term soliday at least as far back as 2012 to refer to days off due to time phasing or the syncing of planetary schedules.

== Conversion ==
Considering a possible colonization of Mars, one question that arose was "how does one convert a Sol to standard Earth time?". In the science fiction series Mars trilogy by Kim Stanley Robinson, the Mars settlers use traditional Earth watches that stop ticking at midnight for 39 minutes and 40 seconds before resuming their timekeeping. This creates something like a "witching hour" which compensates for the time difference between a Sol and an Earth day. This follows the method previously given by Philip K. Dick in his 1964 novel Martian Time-Slip.

For the Spirit mission, a small watchmaker's store created mechanical watches for the mission crew that kept Mars time with no more than 10 seconds difference per Earth-day. In 2022, it was reported that the watchmaker Omega had begun to sell digital-analog hybrid watches to the public at a price of US$7,000.
