= C/2013 A1 (Siding Spring) =

Comet that had a close encounter with Mars in 2014

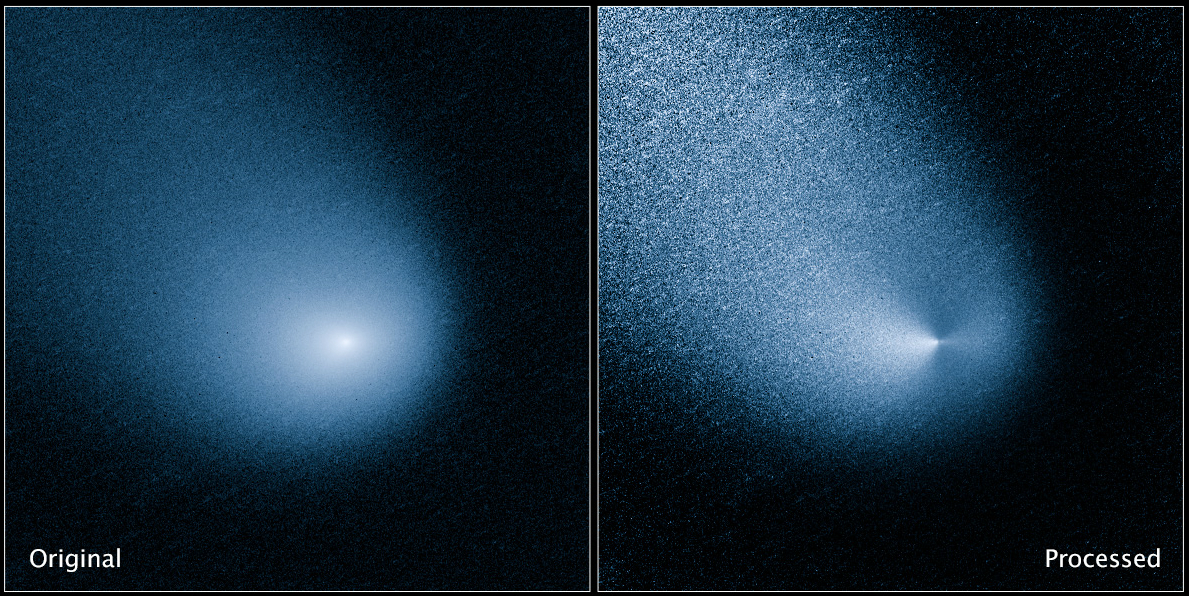
- Comet Siding Spring as seen by Hubble on 11 March 2014

Discovery
- Discovered by: Siding Spring Observatory; 0.5-m Schmidt (E12)
- Discovery date: 3 January 2013

Orbital characteristics
- Epoch: 30 October 2014 (JD 2456960.5)
- Observation arc: 3.53 years
- Number of observations: 449
- Orbit type: Oort cloud
- Aphelion: 52,000 AU (inbound); 13,000 AU (outbound)
- Perihelion: 1.39875 AU
- Eccentricity: 1.00043
- Orbital period: several million years inbound (Barycentric solution for epoch 1950); ~500000 years outbound (Barycentric solution for epoch 2050)
- Inclination: 129.033°
- Longitude of ascending node: 300.999°
- Argument of periapsis: 2.449°
- Last perihelion: 25 October 2014
- T_{Jupiter}: –0.919
- Earth MOID: 0.3836 AU
- Jupiter MOID: 3.6748 AU

Physical characteristics
- Dimensions: ~400–700 m (0.25–0.43 mi)
- Mean density: 390±80 kg/m^{3}
- Synodic rotation period: 8.0±0.08 hours
- Comet total magnitude (M1): 8.5
- Comet nuclear magnitude (M2): 12.0

C/2013 A1 (Siding Spring) is an Oort cloud comet discovered on 3 January 2013 by Robert H. McNaught at Siding Spring Observatory using the 0.5-meter (20 in) Uppsala Southern Schmidt Telescope.

At the time of discovery it was 7.2 AU (1.08 billion km) from the Sun and located in the constellation Lepus. Comet C/2013 A1 probably took millions of years to come from the Oort cloud. After leaving the planetary region of the Solar System, the post-perihelion orbital period (epoch 2050) is estimated to be roughly 1 million years.

C/2013 A1 passed the planet Mars very closely on 19 October 2014, at a distance of 140,496.6 km (87,300.5 mi). After its discovery, there was thought to be a chance of a collision with Mars, but this possibility was excluded when its orbit was determined with about a 200-day observation arc.

All NASA Mars orbiters—including 2001 Mars Odyssey, Mars Reconnaissance Orbiter and MAVEN—as well as ESA's orbiter, Mars Express, and ISRO's orbiter Mangalyaan, reported a healthy status after the comet flyby on 19 October 2014. During the flyby, orbiters around Mars detected thousands of kilograms per hour of comet dust composed of magnesium, iron, sodium, potassium, manganese, nickel, chromium and zinc. In addition, the comet nucleus was determined to be between 400 and 700 meters (0.2 and 0.4 mi) in diameter, much smaller than originally assumed. The nucleus rotates once every eight hours.

== Discovery ==
The comet was discovered on 3 January 2013 by professional astronomer Robert McNaught at the Siding Spring Observatory at Coonabarabran NSW Australia and received the official designation C/2013 A1. It was named Siding Spring based on a tradition to identify the observatory that discovered it. Three images were obtained through the use of a CCD camera mounted on the Uppsala Southern Schmidt Telescope with a spherical mirror of 0.5 meters in diameter. Comet Siding Spring had an apparent magnitude of 18.4 to 18.6. At the time of its discovery, it was 7.2 AU (1.08×10^{9} km; 670,000,000 mi) from the Sun.

Precovery images by the Catalina Sky Survey from 8 December 2012 were found quickly and announced with the discovery giving Comet Siding Spring a 29-day observation arc. On 3 March 2013, Pan-STARRS precovery images from 4 October 2012 were announced that extended the observation arc to 148 days.

Comet Siding Spring Mars flyby on 19 October 2014 (artist's concepts)

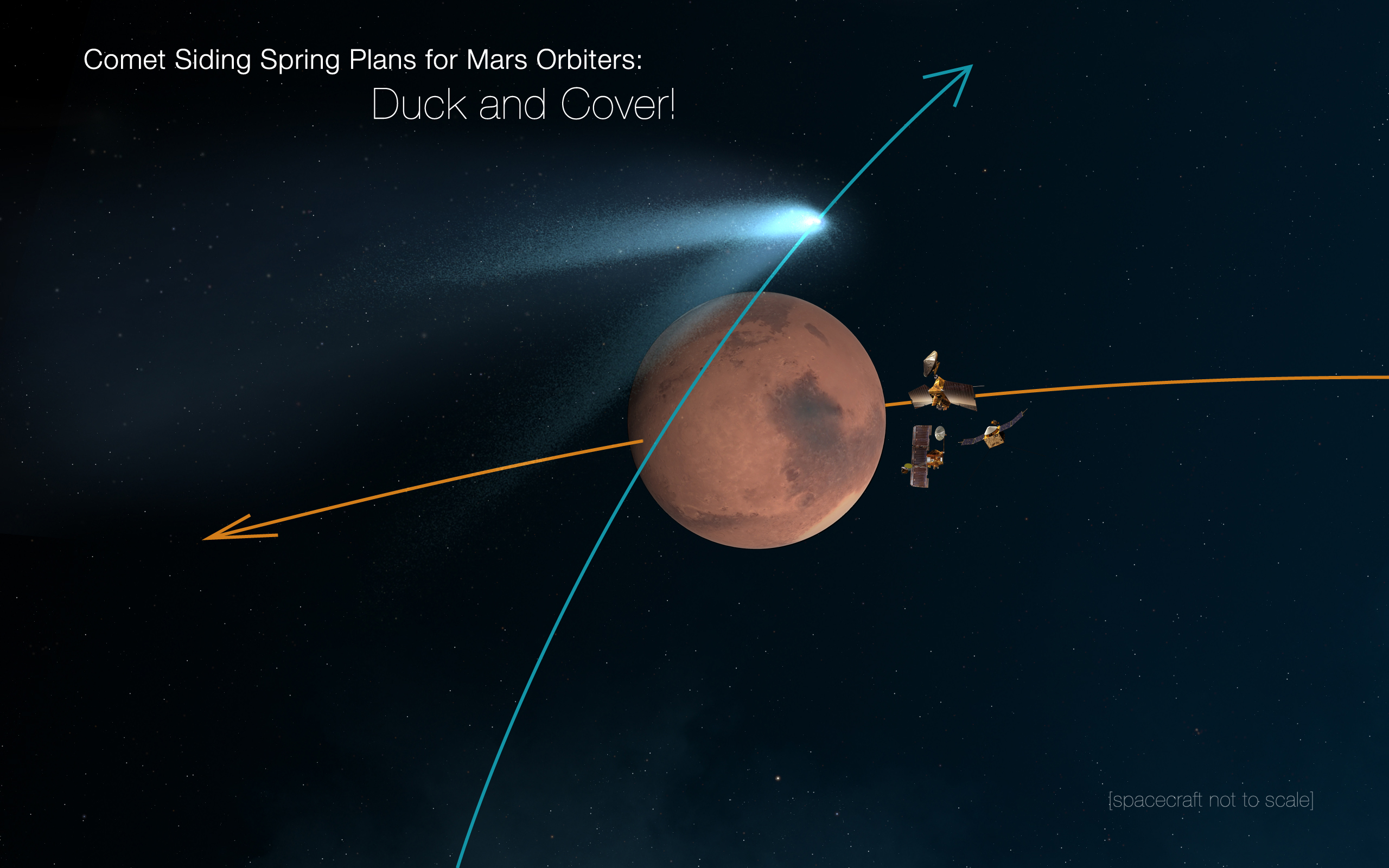
Orbiters take cover from Comet Siding Spring during Mars flyby

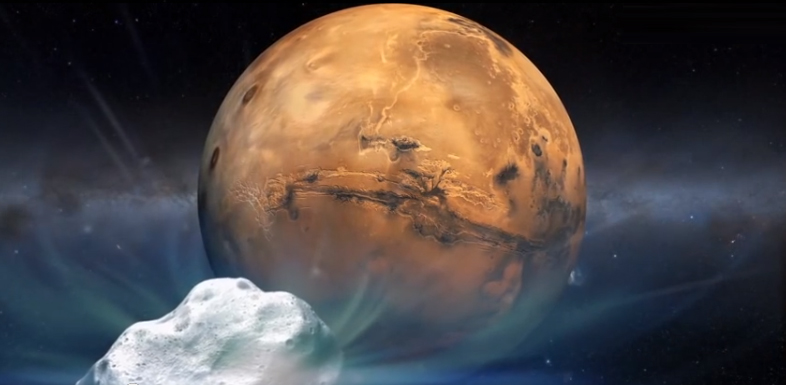
Mars as seen from Comet Siding Spring

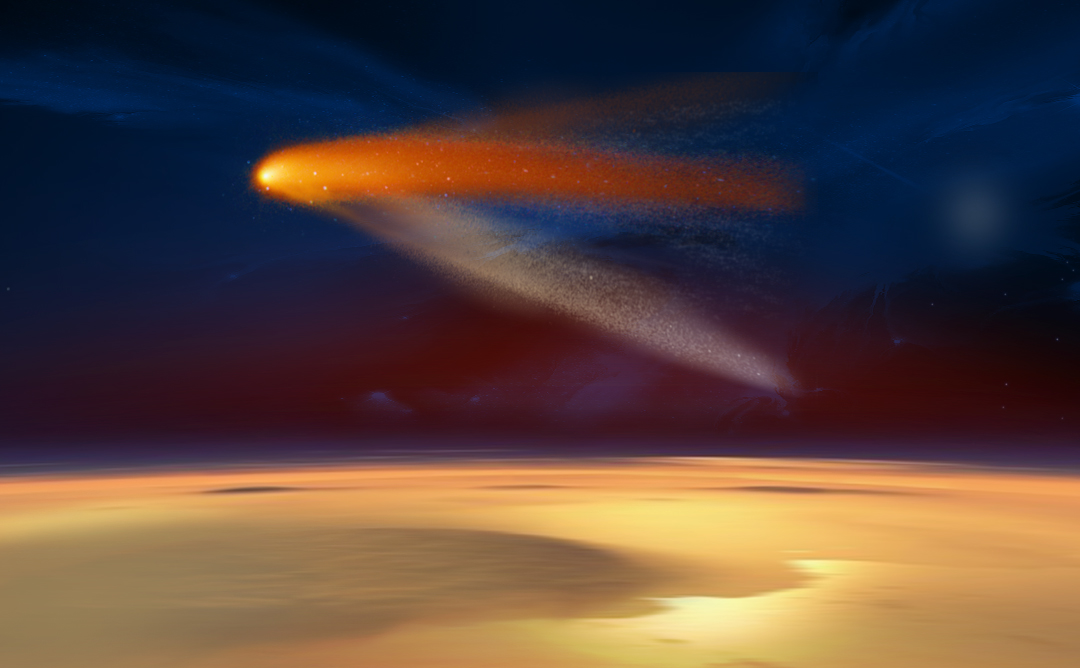
Comet Siding Spring as seen from Mars

== Encounter with Mars ==
Animation of C/2013 A1 orbit Sun · Mercury · Venus · Earth · Mars · C/2013 A1

Comet Siding Spring passed extremely close to Mars on 19 October 2014 at 18:28 ± 0:01 UTC. Initial observations by Leonid Elenin on 27 February 2013, suggested that it might pass 0.000276 AU (41,300 km; 25,700 mi) from the center of Mars. With an observation arc of 733 days, the nominal pass is 0.000931 AU (139,300 km; 86,500 mi) from the center-point of Mars and the uncertainty region shows that it would not come closer than 0.000927 AU (138,700 km; 86,200 mi).

For comparison, Mars's outer moon Deimos orbits it at a distance of 0.00016 AU (24,000 km; 15,000 mi). Due to the uncertainty region, there was the possibility that it could pass Mars as far away as 0.000934 AU (139,700 km; 86,800 mi). It actually passed by at a distance of 140,496.6 ± 4.0 km (87,300.5 ± 2.5 mi), at a relative velocity of 56 km/s (35 mi/s). As seen from Mars, C/2013 A1 peaked at approximately apparent magnitude −6.

Comet Siding Spring encounter with Mars, 19 October 2014

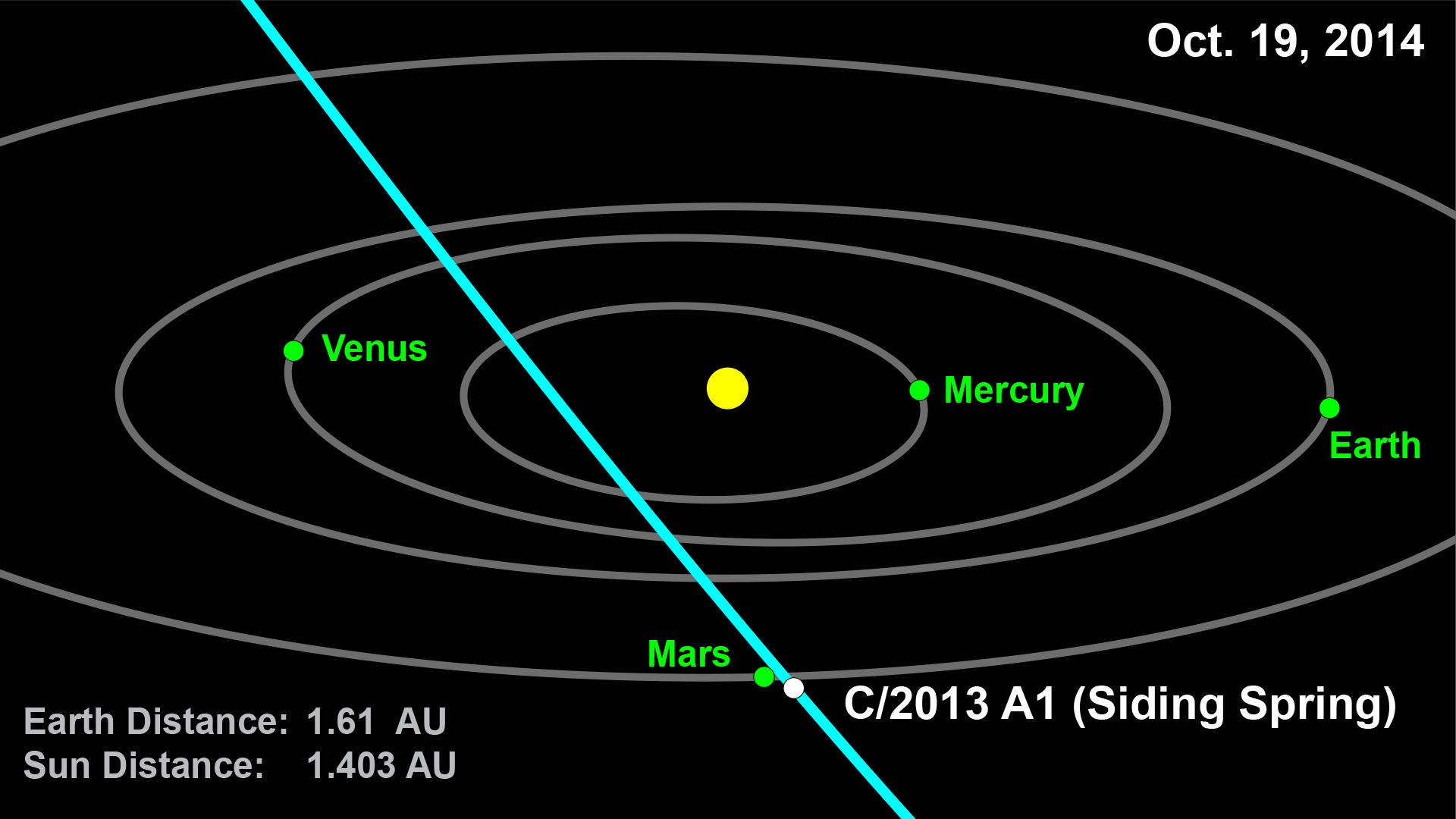
Projected position of Comet Siding Spring and its closest approach to Mars

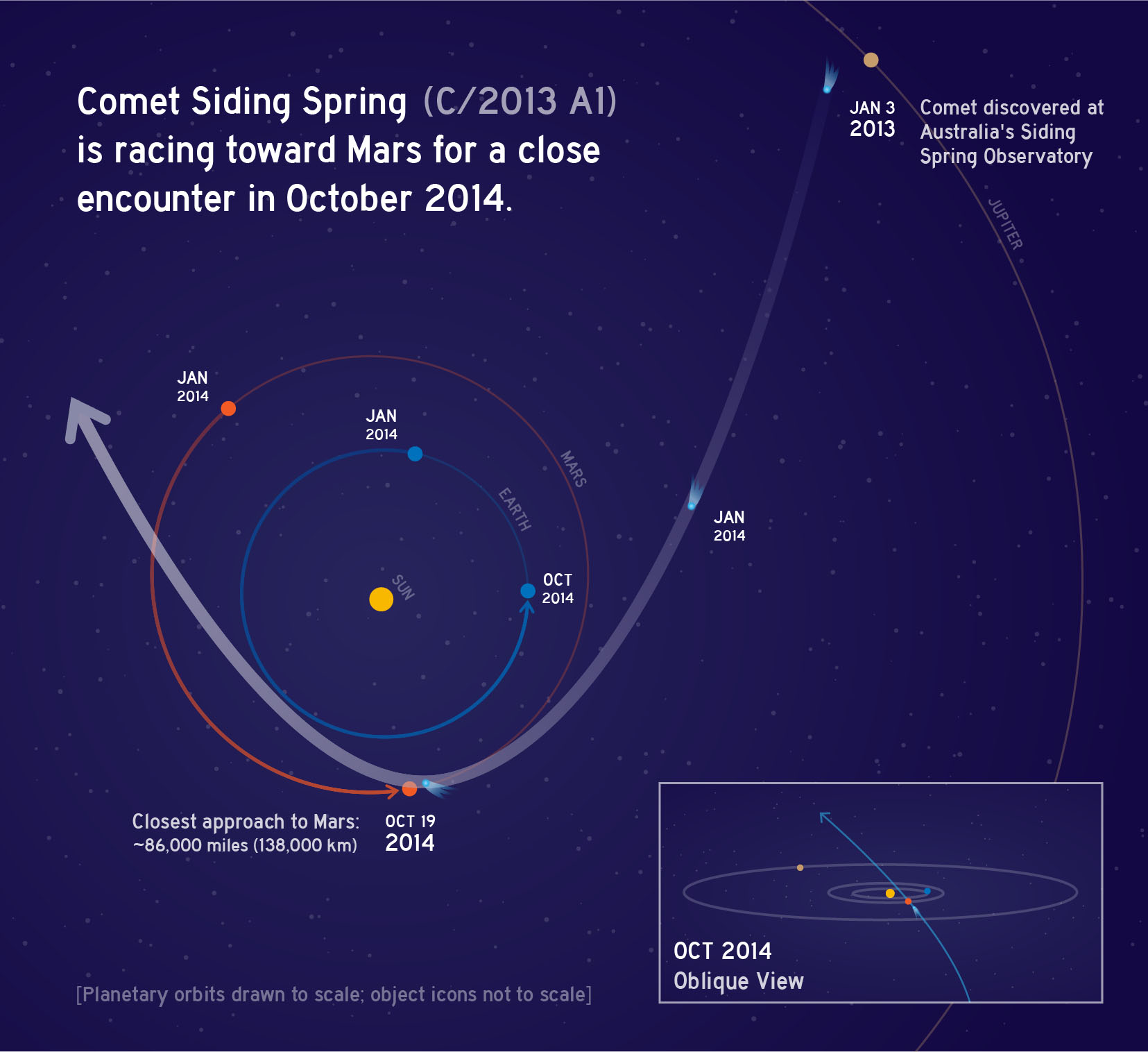
Comet Siding Spring encounter

JPL Small-Body Database – uncertainty region for close approach to Mars on 19 October 2014
Observation arc (in days)	Minimum distance (AU)	Nominal distance (AU)	Maximum distance (AU)	Nominal passage time (UT)
44	0	0.0059	0.024	10:26
58	0	0.0025	0.012	15:50
74	0	0.00070	0.0079	21:00
148	0	0.00035	0.0021	19:28
154	0	0.00074	0.0023	18:50
162	0	0.00079	0.0023	18:45
171	0	0.00080	0.0022	18:44
185	0.00006	0.00076	0.0020	18:51
201	0.000068	0.00080	0.0019	18:45
211	0.000209	0.00079	0.0018	18:45
244	0.000098	0.00082	0.0016	18:41
293	0.000252	0.00082	0.0014	18:41
341	0.000443	0.00089	0.0013	18:32
360	0.000546	0.00089	0.0012	18:32
369	0.000607	0.00093	0.0012	18:28
379	0.000595	0.00088	0.0012	18:34
388	0.000690	0.00090	0.0011	18:31
394	0.000775	0.00095	0.0011	18:26
399	0.000801	0.00095	0.0011	18:26
415	0.000853	0.00096	0.0011	18:25
428	0.000868	0.00096	0.0010	18:25
465	0.000875	0.00092	0.0010	18:28
493	0.000867	0.00090	0.00093	18:31
612	0.000858	0.00088	0.00091	18:32
662	0.000858	0.00088	0.00090	18:33
687	0.000926	0.00093	0.00094	18:28
694	0.000916	0.00093	0.00094	18:28
733	0.000927	0.00093	0.00093	18:28

=== Predicted effects ===
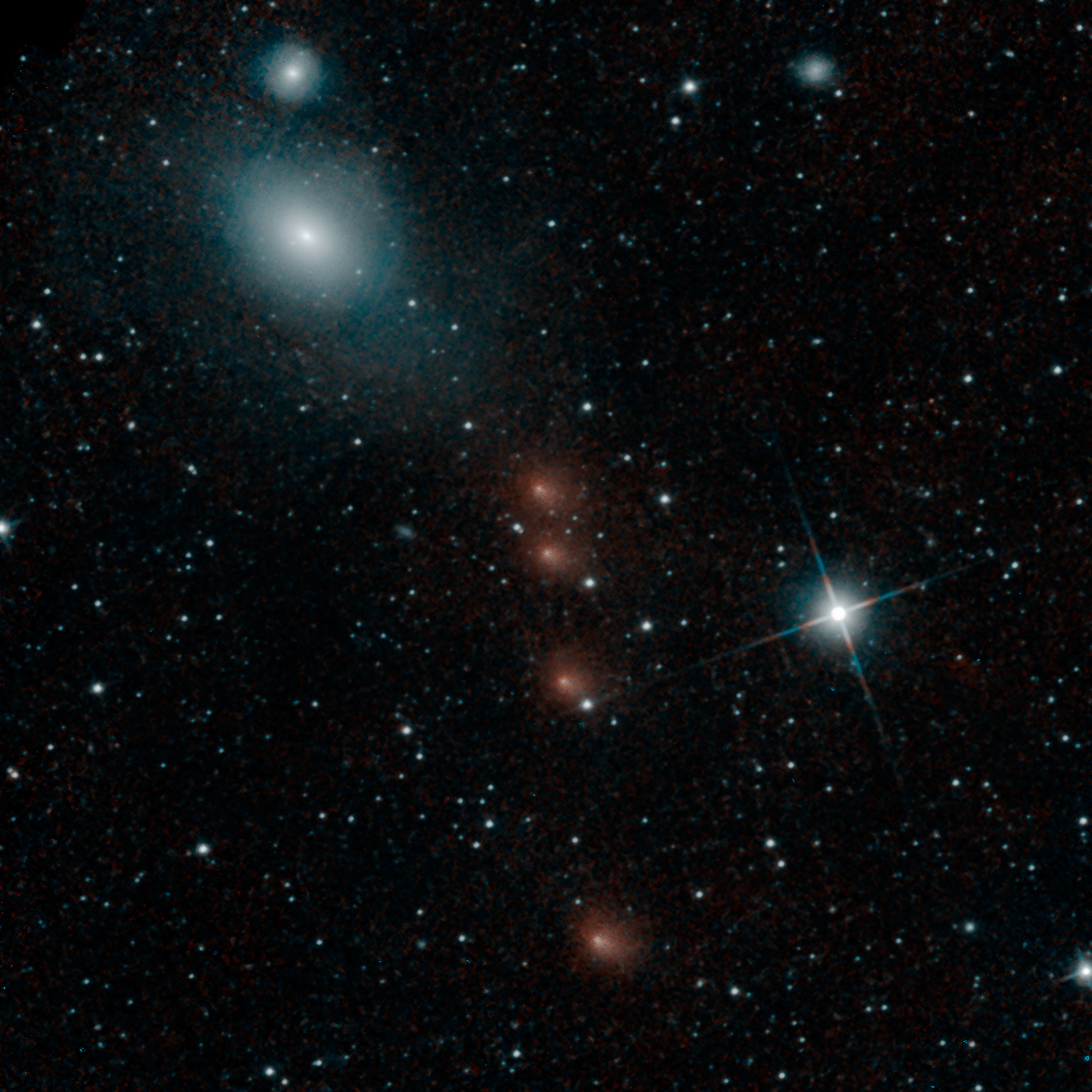
C/2013 A1 – four images

The main body of the comet's tail was projected to miss Mars by some 10 Mars diameters. As a result, only higher-than-average-velocity meteoroid dust, ejected earlier in the approach of the comet, allow for impacts on Mars, its moons, and orbiting spacecraft. Dust particles ejected from the nucleus of the comet, at more than double the expected velocity when the comet was 3 AU from the Sun, could reach Mars approximately 43 to 130 min after the closest approach of the comet. There is a possibility for millimeter- to centimeter-size particles released more than 13 AU from the Sun, however, this is considered unlikely, although massive ejections from farther out have been deduced.

In 2013 it was thought possible that Comet Siding Spring would create a meteor shower on Mars or be a threat to the spacecraft in Mars orbit. Studies in 2014 showed the threat to orbiting spacecraft to be minimal. The greatest threat would be about 100 minutes after closest approach. Mars passed about 27,000 km (17,000 mi) from the comet's orbit around 20:10 UT.

The coma of the comet is projected to more than double the amount of hydrogen in the high atmosphere for a period of several tens of hours and to warm it by about 30 K for a few hours—the combination increasing the effect of atmospheric drag on the Mars Reconnaissance Orbiter and MAVEN spacecraft causing a measurable increase in orbital decay because of atmospheric ram pressure. These spacecraft will be approaching Mars to minimum altitudes of 250 km and 150 km and orbital periods of 3 and 4 hours, respectively. The amount of drag cannot be narrowed down greatly until the production rate of the comet is known, but it could be from 1.6 to 40 times normal drag. MAVEN, in particular, also has instruments to observe any changes to the gas composition of the atmosphere. The closer moon of Mars, Phobos, orbits far higher, at a minimum distance of 9,234.42 km (5,738.00 mi), more than 10 times the height of Mars's atmosphere.

Estimates for the diameter of the nucleus have varied from 1–50 km (0.62–31.07 mi), but now the nucleus is known to be only approximately 400–700 m (1,300–2,300 ft) in diameter, roughly the diameter of asteroid 2010 XG11 that approached Mars on 29 July 2014. Based on early upper-limit size estimates, the resulting upper-limit energy of a hypothetical impact with Mars was 24 billion megatons. The diameter of such a hypothetical impact crater would be roughly ten times the diameter of the comet's nucleus. A 700-meter impactor would create around a 7–10 km (4.3–6.2 mi) crater.

The odds of an impact with Mars were 1-in-1250 in March 2013, 1-in-2000 in late March 2013, 1 in 8000 by April 2013, and 1-in-120,000 by 8 April 2013. The 8 April 2013 JPL Small-Body Database 3-sigma solution was the first estimate to show that the minimum approach by Comet Siding Spring would miss Mars.

=== Actual effects ===
MAVEN detected an intense meteor shower. Comet Siding Spring has a rotation period of approximately 8 hours. Debris from Comet Siding Spring added a temporary, but strong layer of ions to Mars's ionosphere (the first time such a phenomenon has been observed on any planet), and 85 tonnes of cometary dust were vaporized high in Mars's atmosphere. Magnesium, iron, and other metals were observed to have been deposited. An observer on the surface would have seen a few tens of meteors during the plane crossing.

During the flyby of Mars at a proximity of 140,000 km (87,000 mi), Comet Siding Spring's magnetic field, generated by its interaction with the solar wind, caused a violent turmoil that lasted for several hours, long after its flyby. Its coma washed over Mars with the dense inner coma, reaching or almost reaching the planet's surface. The cometary magnetic field temporarily merged with and overwhelmed Mars's weak magnetic field.

== Observation ==
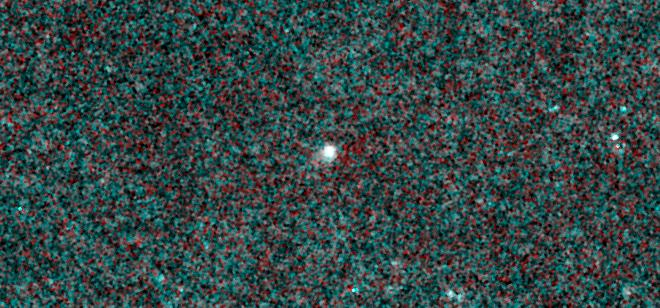
Comet Siding Spring as seen by NEOWISE on 16 January 2014

As seen from Earth, on 19 October 2014, Mars was in the constellation Ophiuchus, near globular cluster NGC 6401, and 60 degrees from the Sun. Mars and C/2013 A1 were 1.6 AU (240 million km; 150 million mi) from Earth. As of October 2014, C/2013 A1 had an apparent magnitude of roughly 11 and was the third-brightest comet in the sky at that time. At an apparent magnitude of 0.9, Mars was estimated to be about 11,000 times brighter than the diffuse-looking comet with a low-surface brightness. (Note: Apparent magnitude: $(\sqrt[5]{100})^{11-0.9}\approx 10964$) To observe C/2013 A1 visually from Earth would have required a telescope with an optical mirror at least 0.2 m (7.9 in) in diameter. By November 2014 the comet had dimmed to magnitude 11.6 and was only around the fifth-brightest comet in the sky.

Mars and Comet Siding Spring were visible to the STEREO-A spacecraft during the 2014 encounter. In orbit around Mars were the spacecraft Mars Reconnaissance Orbiter, 2001 Mars Odyssey, ESA's Mars Express, MAVEN, and the Indian Mars Orbiter Mission (Mangalyaan). The last two missions had arrived less than one month before the closest approach of C/2013 A1 to Mars. All these artificial satellites may have been exposed to potentially damaging particles. The level of exposure will not be known for months, but NASA had taken several "precautionary measures" as it prepared to study C/2013 A1. Two key strategies to lessen the risk were to place the orbiters on the opposite side of Mars at the time of the highest risk and to orient the orbiters so that their most vulnerable parts were not in the line of impact. On the ground, the Curiosity and Opportunity rovers obtained images as well. Results from the observations will be discussed during a special session "Comet C/2013 A1 Siding Spring at Mars" at the 2014 AGU Fall Meeting in San Francisco on 18 December 2014.

== Gallery ==
=== Before comet flyby ===
Comet Siding Spring passes Mars on 19 October 2014.

Orbiters hide as Comet Siding Spring passes Mars.

MAVEN and Comet Siding Spring encounter Mars.

MAVEN and Comet Siding Spring encountering Mars – fixed-camera view.

Comet Siding Spring – watched by several landers and orbiting spacecraft.

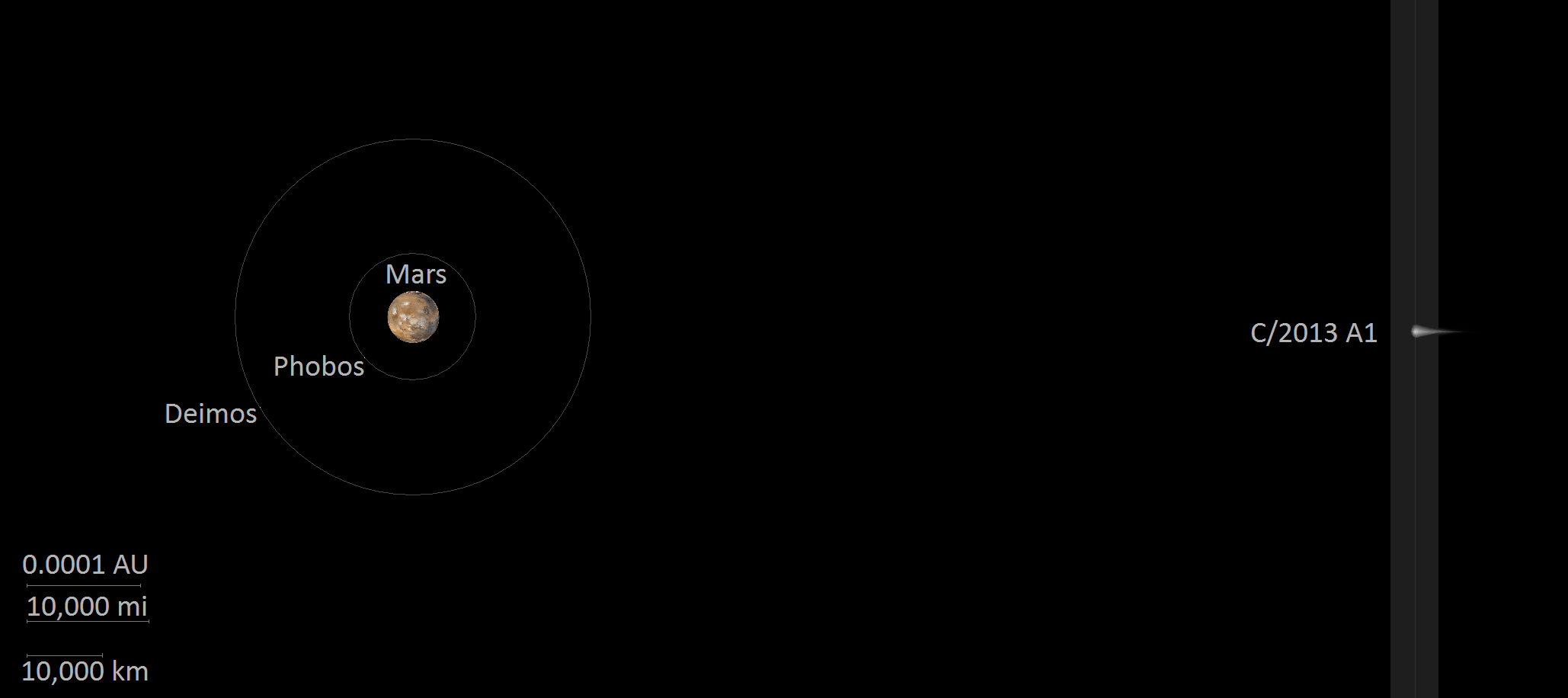
Closest approach of Comet Siding Spring to Mars – maximum and minimum distances noted

=== During comet flyby ===
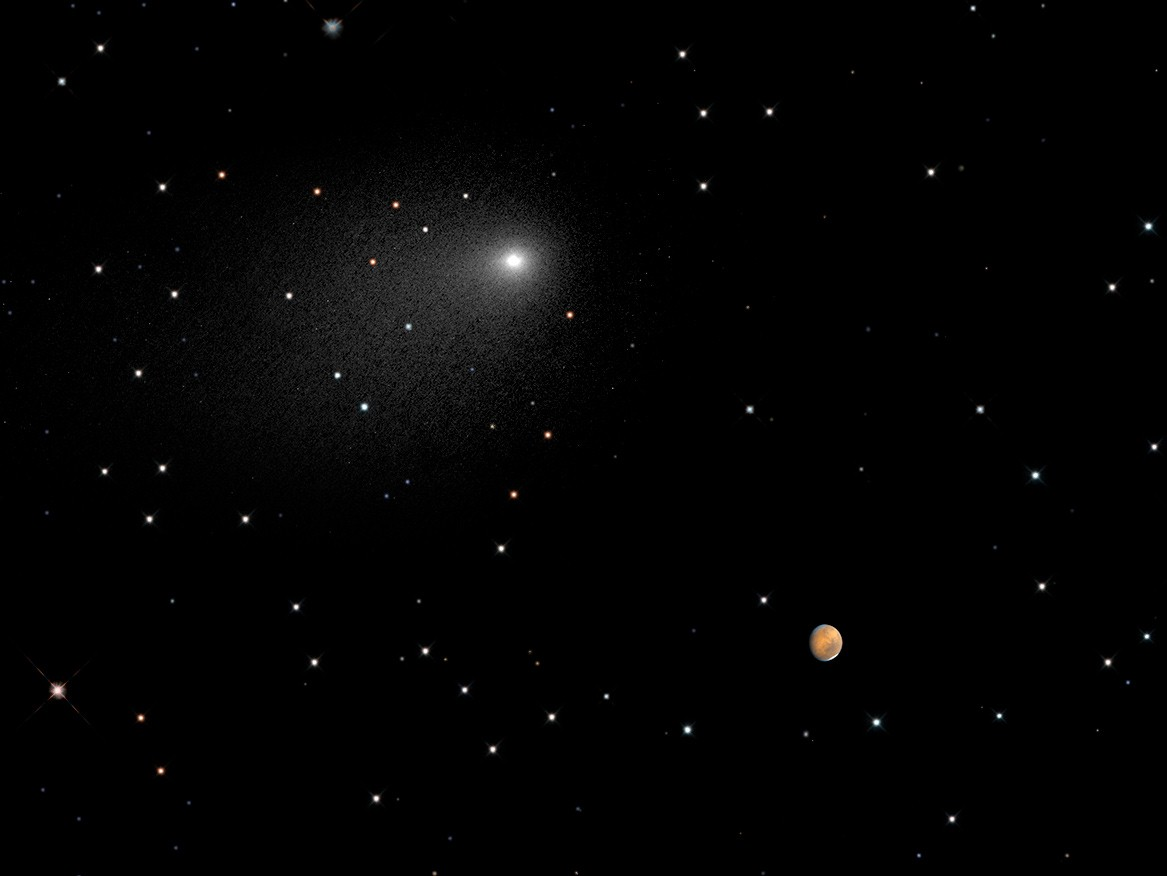
Close encounter of Comet Siding Spring with the planet Mars
(composite image; Hubble ST; 19 October 2014).
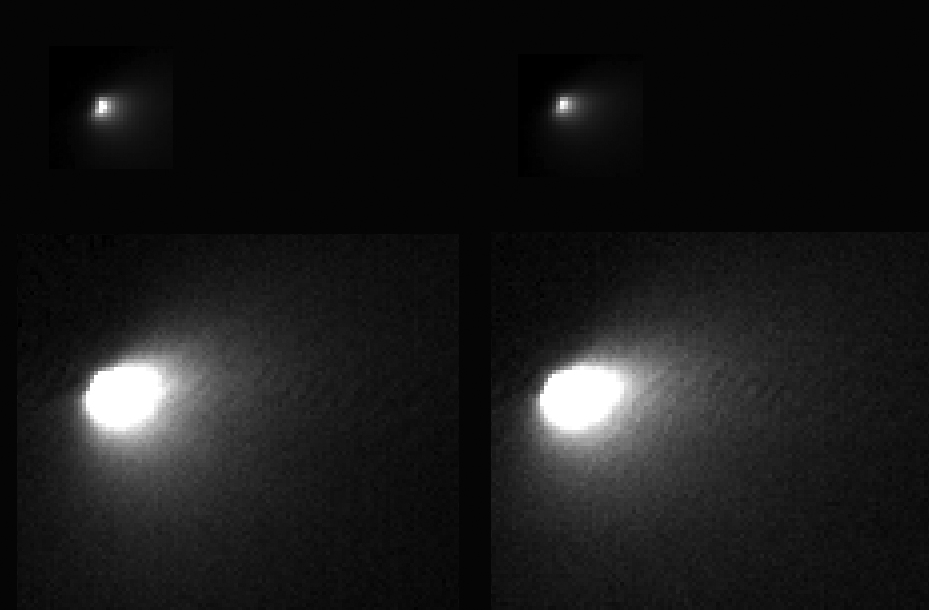
Images taken by the Mars Reconnaissance Orbiter of Comet Siding Spring on 19 October 2014

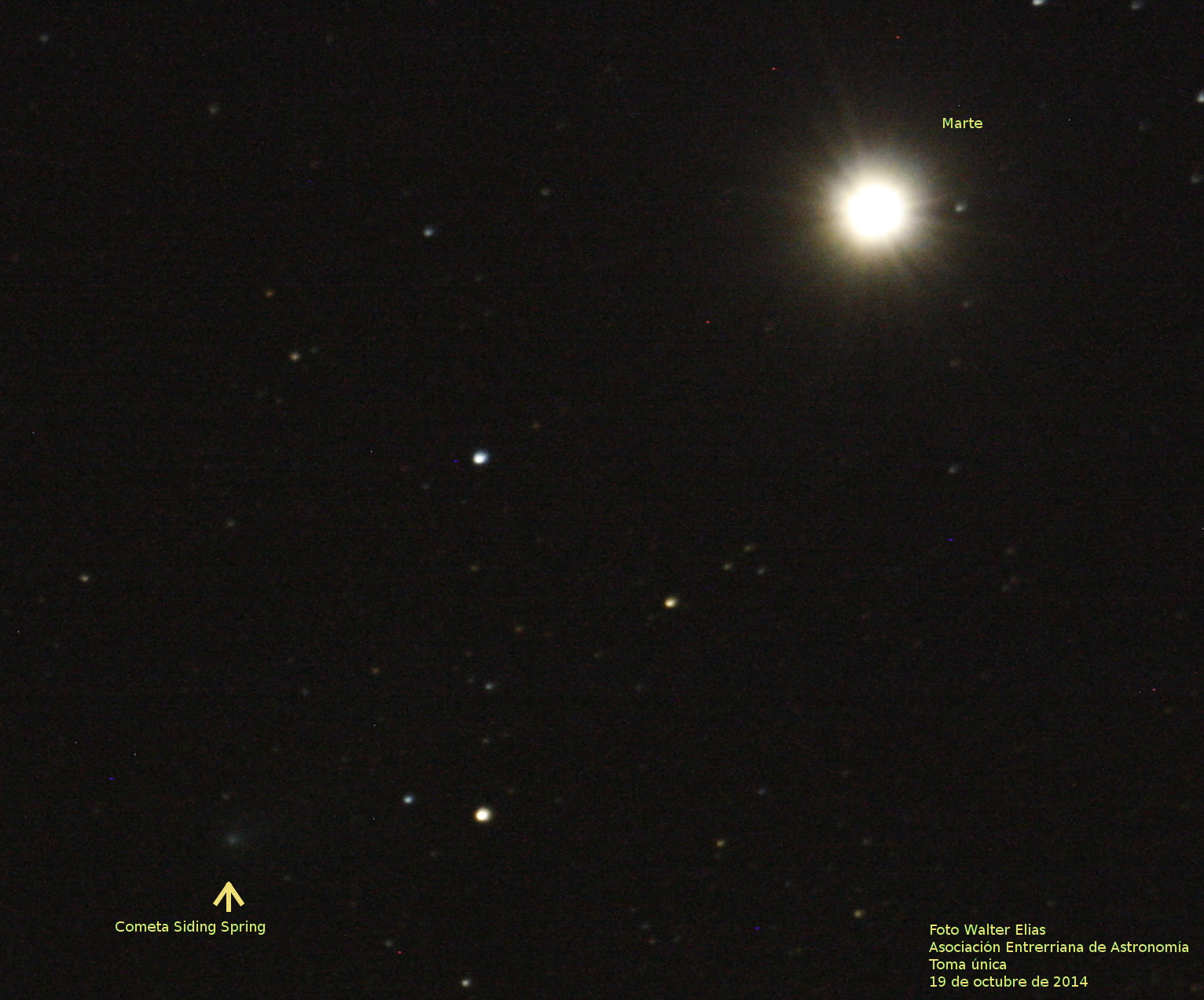
Image by the Observatorio de la Asociación Entrerriana de Astronomía from Earth on 19 October 2014

Images taken by the Opportunity Rover of Comet Siding Spring from the Martian surface on 19 October 2014

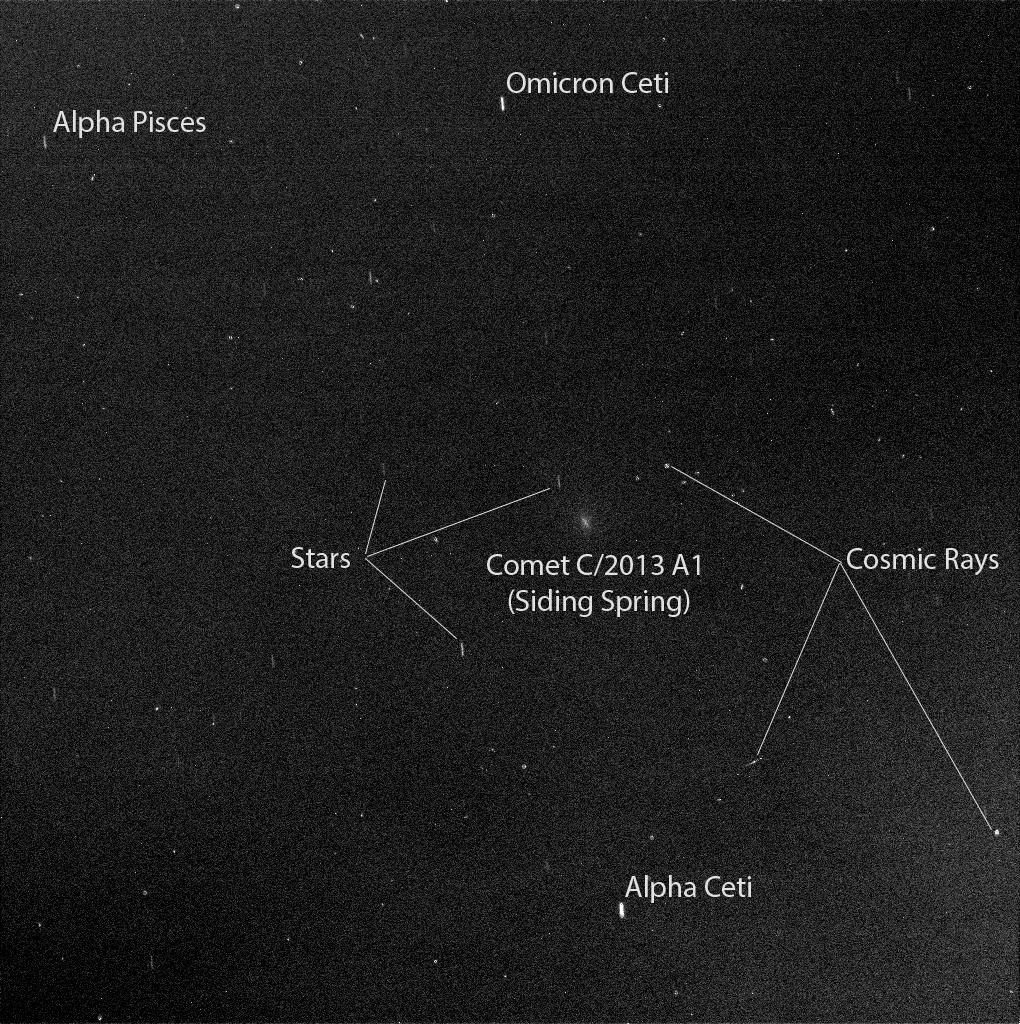
Image taken by the Opportunity Rover of Comet Siding Spring from the Martian surface on 19 October 2014

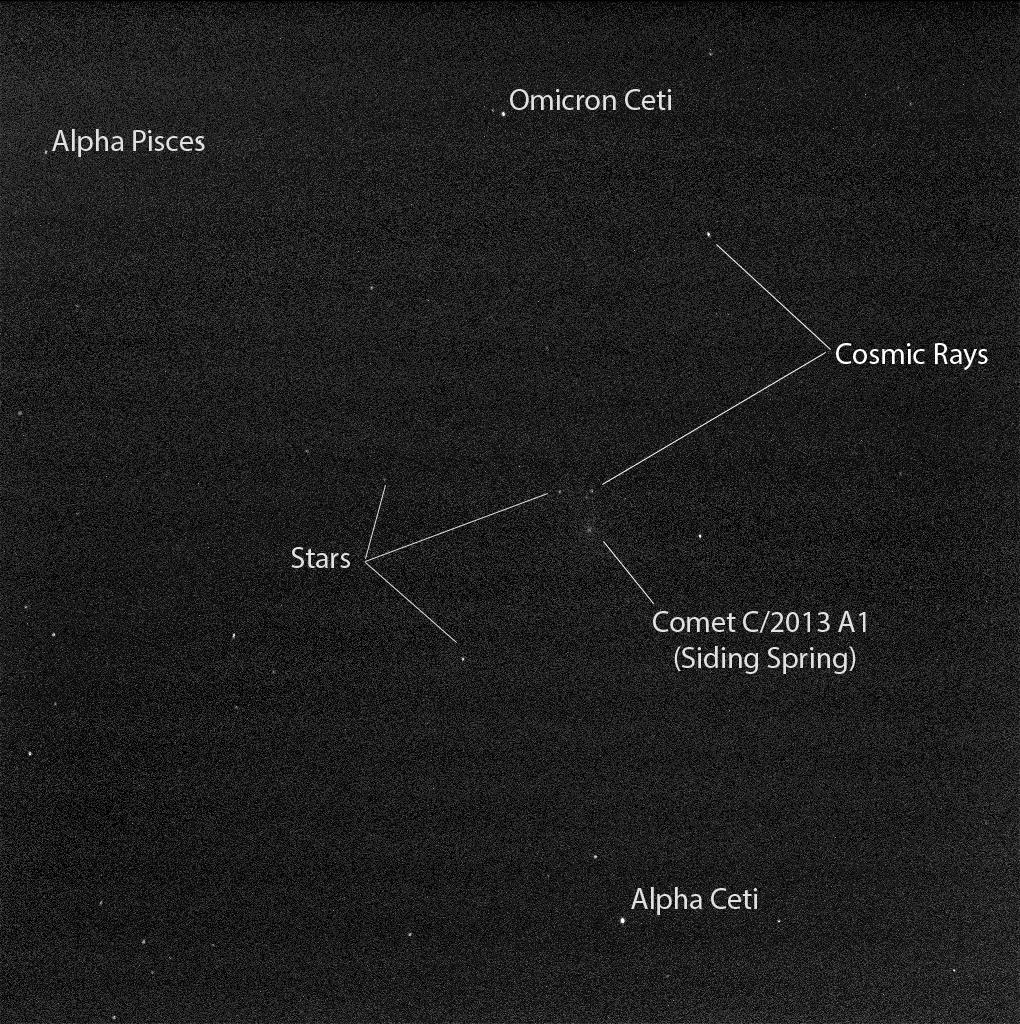
Image taken by the Opportunity Rover of Comet Siding Spring from the Martian surface on 19 October 2014
The Curiosity rover views Comet C/2013 A1 during flyby on 19 October 2014.
