= Jane Lee Fox =

Physicist

- Education: Harvard University (PhD Chemical Physics); University of Michigan (BS Chemistry)
- Scientific career
- Workplaces: Wright State University
- Thesis: The upper atmospheres of Mars and Venus (1978)

Jane Lee Fox is a physicist known for her research on the atmosphere of planets including Mars and Venus. She has many published works at her current institution, Wright State University.

== Education and career ==
Jane Fox attended Bloomfield Hills Lahser High School from 1967-1970.

Fox has a B.S. in chemistry from the University of Michigan (1973) and earned her Ph.D. in chemical physics from Harvard University in 1978. She was on the faculty at Stony Brook University from 1984 to 2003. Fox joined Wright State University in 2002 as a research professor at Wright State University in the Boonshoft School of Medicine.

== Research ==
Fox is known for her research modeling the atmosphere on Mars, including details on nitrogen found in the Martian atmosphere. She has also worked on the atmosphere around Venus and examined hydrocarbons in atmosphere of Titan, one of the moon's of Saturn. Fox was a member of the science team for the Mars Atmosphere and Volatile Evolution (MAVEN) project where she studied long-term changes in Mars' atmosphere.

Since 1977, Fox has published 92 articles and 85 presentations in her field.

=== Selected publications ===
- Fox, J. L.; Dalgarno, A. (1979). "Ionization, luminosity, and heating of the upper atmosphere of Mars". Journal of Geophysical Research: Space Physics. 84 (A12): 7315–7333. Bibcode:1979JGR....84.7315F. doi:10.1029/JA084iA12p07315. ISSN 2156-2202. S2CID 56122235.
- Fox, J. L. (1993). "The production and escape of nitrogen atoms on Mars". Journal of Geophysical Research: Planets. 98 (E2): 3297–3310. Bibcode:1993JGR....98.3297F. doi:10.1029/92JE02289. ISSN 2156-2202.
- Fox, J. L.; Sung, K. Y. (2001). "Solar activity variations of the Venus thermosphere/ionosphere". Journal of Geophysical Research: Space Physics. 106 (A10): 21305–21335. Bibcode:2001JGR...10621305F. doi:10.1029/2001JA000069. ISSN 2156-2202.

== Awards and honors ==
- Fellow, American Geophysical Union (2005)
