= Bruce Jakosky =

American scientist

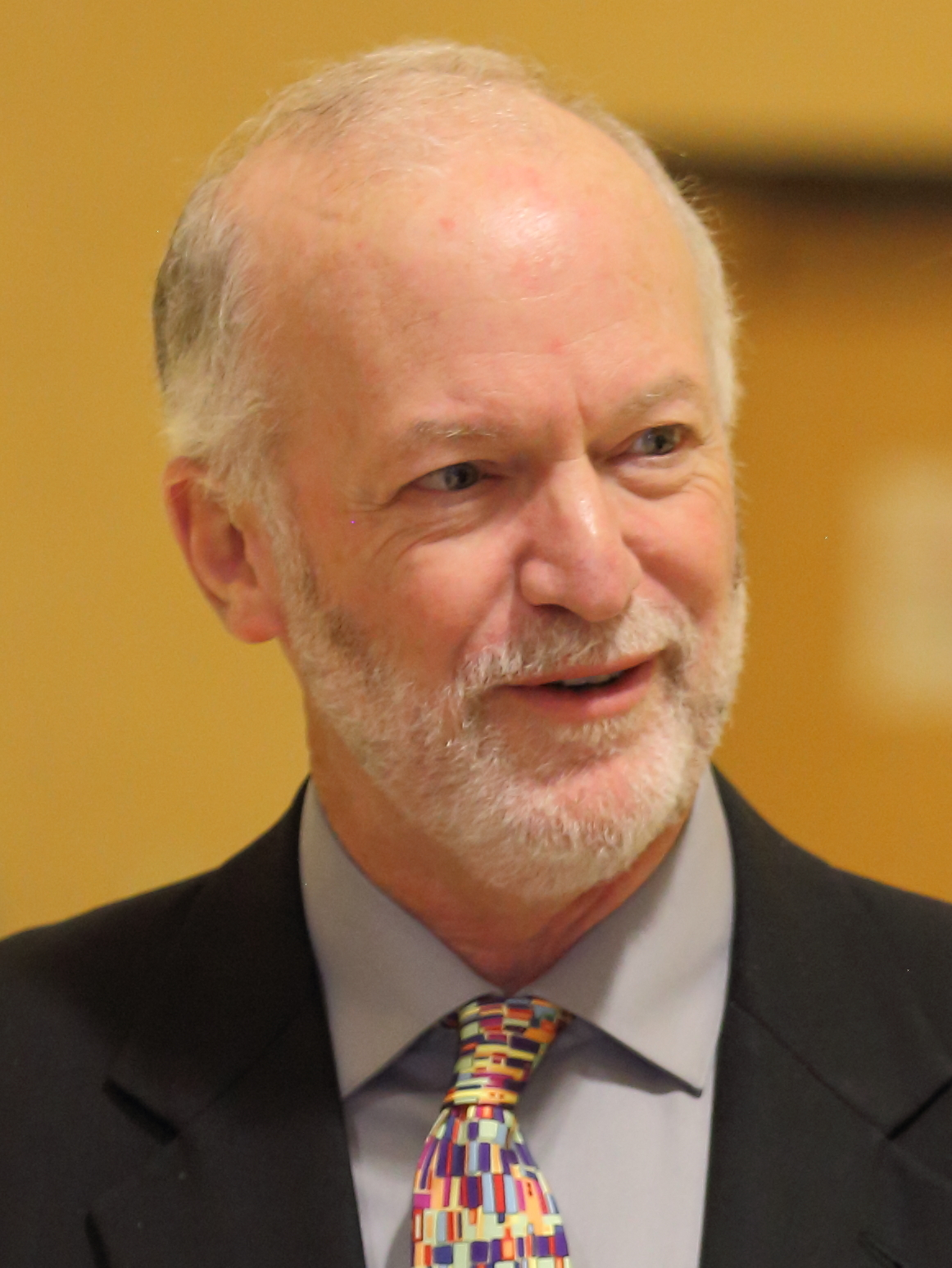
- Jakosky in 2016
- Born: Bruce Martin Jakosky; December 9, 1955 (age 70)
- Occupation: Scientist
- Employer: University of Colorado at Boulder

Bruce Martin Jakosky (born December 9, 1955) is a professor of Geological Sciences and associate director of the Laboratory for Atmospheric and Space Physics (LASP) at the University of Colorado, Boulder. He has been involved with the Viking, Solar Mesosphere Explorer, Clementine, Mars Observer, Mars Global Surveyor, Mars Odyssey, Mars Science Laboratory and MAVEN spacecraft missions, and is involved in planning future spacecraft missions.

== Biography ==
=== Career ===
Jakosky heads the University of Colorado at Boulder team within the NASA Astrobiology Institute. He was a research associate at Laboratory for Atmospherics and Space Physics from 1982 to 1988. He serves on numerous national advisory committees and is an associate director at the Laboratory for Atmospheric and Space Physics at the University of Colorado at Boulder. He is an expert in Earth and planetary geology and extraterrestrial life, including both the science and the societal and philosophical issues relating to the science. His research interests are in the geology of planetary surfaces, specifically the geology of Mars, the evolution of the martian atmosphere and climate, atmospheric chemistry, the potential for life on Mars and elsewhere, and the philosophical and societal issues in astrobiology.

In September 2008, the MAVEN project, a Mars orbiter, was chosen as an upcoming NASA exploration mission. The probe was launched on November 18, 2013. Jakosky served as MAVEN's principal investigator from inception in 2003 until he stepped down on August 31, 2021, passing the leadership on to Shannon Curry. The $485 million program represents the largest research contract ever awarded to the University of Colorado at Boulder.

== Selected publications ==
=== Books ===
- Jakosky, B.M. (1998). The search for life on other planets, Cambridge University Press.
- Jakosky, B.M. (2006). Science, Society, and the Search for Life in the Universe, Univ. Arizona Press.

=== Articles and essays ===
- Henderson, B.G., B.M. Jakosky and C.E. Randall, A Monte Carlo Model of Polarized Thermal Emission from Particulate Planetary Surfaces, Icarus, 99, 51, 1992
- Jakosky, B.M., Out on a limb: Martian atmospheric dust opacity during the past hundred years, Icarus, 117, 352–357, 1995
- Mellon, M.T., and B.M. Jakosky, The distribution and behavior of martian ground ice during past and present epochs, J. Geophys. Res., 100, E6, 11,781-11,799, 1995
- Henderson, B.G., P.G. Lucey, and B.M. Jakosky, New laboratory measurements of Mid-IR emission spectra of simulated planetary surfaces, J. Geophys. Res., 101, No. E, 14,969-14,975, 1996
- Hutchins, K.S., and B.M. Jakosky, Evolution of Martian atmospheric argon: Implications for sources of volatiles, J. Geophys. Res., 101, No. E, 14,933-14,949, 1996
- Hutchins, K.S., and B.M. Jakosky, Impact of a paleo-magnetic field on sputtering loss of martian atmospheric argon and neon, J. Geophys. Res., In Press, 1996
- Hutchins, K.S., and B.M. Jakosky, Sources of martian atmospheric volatiles, J. Geophys. Res., Submitted, 1996
- Hutchins, K.S., and B.M. Jakosky, Carbonates in martian meteorite ALH84001: A planetary perspective on formation temperature, Geophys. Res. Lett., In Press, 1996
- Jakosky, B.M., Warm havens for life on Mars, New Scientist, 150, 38–42, 1996
- Jakosky, B.M., Martian stable isotopes: Volatile evolution, climate change, and exobiological implications, Orig. Life Evol. Biosphere, Submitted, 1996
- Jakosky, B.M., R.C. Reedy, and J. Masarik, Carbon 14 measurements of the martian atmosphere as an indicator of atmosphere-regolith exchange of CO2, J. Geophys. Res., 101, 2247–2252, 1996
- Mellon, M.T., B.M. Jakosky, and S.E. Postawko, The persistence of equatorial ground ice on Mars, J. Geophys. Res., Submitted, 1996
- Urquhart, M.L., and B.M. Jakosky, Constraints on the solid-state greenhouse effect on the icy Galileo satellites, J. Geophys. Res., 101, No. E, 21,169-21,176, 1996
- Urquhart, M.L., and B.M. Jakosky, Lunar thermal emission and remote determination of surface properties, J. Geophys. Res., In Press, 1996
- Brain, D.A., and B.M. Jakosky, Atmospheric loss since the onset of the martian geologic record: The combined role of impact erosion and sputtering, J. Geophys. Res., Submitted, 1997
- Henderson, B.G., and B.M. Jakosky, Near-surface thermal gradients and mid-IR emission spectra: A new model including scattering and application to real data, J. Geophys. Res., 102, No. E, 6567–6580, 1997
- Hutchins, K.S.y, B.M. Jakosky, and J.G. Luhmann, Impact of a paleomagnetic field on sputtering loss of Martian atmospheric argon and neon, J. Geophys. Res., 102, No. E, 9183–9189, 1997
- Jakosky, B.M., Mars mission satisfies age-old need to explore, Op-Ed piece, Daily Camera, 1-20, 1997
- Jakosky, B.M., Martian exobiology, J. Geophys. Res., 102, 23,673-23,674, 1997
- Jakosky, B.M., Mars life? One year later, The Planetary Report, 17, 10–13, 1997
- Jakosky, B.M., Laying out the evidence: The case for life on Mars, Planetary Report, 17, 12–17, 1997
- Jakosky, B.M., A.P. Zent and R.W. Zurek, The Mars water cycle: Determining the role of exchange with the regolith, Icarus, 130, 87–95, 1997
- Jakosky, B.M., and E.L. Shock, The biological potential of Mars, the early Earth, and Europa, J. Geophys. Res., Submitted, 1997
- Jakosky, B.M., and J.H. Jones, The history of martian volatiles, Rev. Geophys., 135, 1–16, 1997
- Jakosky, B.M., and J.H. Jones, The History of Martian Volatiles, Rev. of Geophys., 35, No. 1, 1–16, 1997
- Jakosky, B.M., and others, Preliminary results of the Clementine Long-Wave Infrared Camera, J. Geophys. Res., Submitted, 1997
- Urquhart, M.L., and B.M. Jakosky, Lunar thermal emission and remote determination of surface properties, J. Geophys. Res., 102, No. E, 10,959-10,969, 1997
- Brain, D.A., and B.M. Jakosky, Atmospheric loss since the onset of the martian geologic record: Combined role of impact erosion and sputtering, J. Geophys. Res., 103, 22,689-22,694, 1998
- Colaprete, A., and B.M. Jakosky, Ice flow and rock glaciers on Mars, J. Geophys. Res., 103, 5897–5909, 1998
- Jakosky, B.M., Opinion: Searching for life in the universe, The Planetary Report, July/, 1998
- Jakosky, B.M., Searching for life in our solar system, Sci. American Presents... (Magnificent Cosmos), 9(1), 16–21, 1998
- Jakosky, B.M., and E.L. Shock, The biological potential of Mars, the early Earth, and Europa, J. Geophys. Res., 103, 19,359-19,364, 1998
- Jakosky, B.M., et al., Long-wave infrared observations of the Moon from the Clementine spacecraft: Preliminary results, J. Geophys. Res., Submitted, 1998
- Jakosky, B.M., Martian stable isotopes: Volatile evolution, climate change, and exobiological implications, Origins Life Evolution Biospheres, 29, 47–57, 1999
- Jakosky, B.M., The atmospheres of the terrestrial planets, in The New Solar System, 4th ed., edited by J.K. Beatty, C.C. Peterson, and A. Chaikin, Sky Publishing Corp., 175–192, 1999
- Jakosky, B.M., Water, climate and life, Science, 283, 648–649, 1999
- Jakosky, B.M., M.T. Mellon, H.H. Kieffer, P.R. Christensen, E.S. Varnes, S.W. Lee, The thermal inertia of Mars from the Mars Global Surveyor Thermal Emission Spectrometer, J. Geophys. Res., In Press, 1999
- Jakosky, B.M., and M.P. Golombek, Planetary science, astrobiology, and the role of science and exploration in society, EOS (Trans. Amer. Geophys. Union) Forum, In Press, 1999
- Lawson, S.L., B.M. Jakosky, H.-S. Park, and M.T. Mellon, The Clementine Long-wave infrared global data set: Brightness temperatures of the lunar surface, J. Geophys. Res., In Press, 1999
- Urquhart, M.L., and B.M. Jakosky, Impact of near-surface thermal gradients on lunar thermal emission and subsurface temperatures, J. Geophys. Res., Submitted, 1999
- Varnes, E.S., and B.M. Jakosky, Stability and lifetime of organic molecules at the surface of Europs, Icarus, Submitted, 1999
- B.M. Jakosky, Philosophical aspects of astrobiology, in "Bioastronomy '99: A New Era in Bioastronomy", edited by G.A. Lemarchand and K.J. Meech, Astron. Soc. Pac., 661–666, In Press, 2000
- Jakosky, B.M. and M.P. Golombeck, Planetary science, astrobiology, and the role of science and exploration in society, EOS (Trans. Amer. Geophys. Union) Forum, 81, No.6, 58, In Press, 2000
- Jakosky, B.M. and M.T. Mellon, Thermal inertia of Mars: Sites of exobiological interest, J. Geophys. Res., In Press, 2000
- Jakosky, B.M., M.T. Mellon, H.H. Kieffer, P.R. Christensen, E.S. Varnes and S.W. Lee, The thermal inertia of Mars from the Mars Global Surveyor Thermal Emission Spectrometer, J. Geophys. Res., 105, 9643–9652, In Press, 2000
- Lawson, S.L., B.M. Jakosky, H.-S. Park and M.T. Mellon, Brightness temperatures of the lunar surface: Calibration and global analysis of the Clementine long-wave infrared camera d, J. Geophys. Res., 105, No.E2, 4273–4290, In Press, 2000
- Mellon, M.T., B.M. Jakosky, H.H. Kieffer and P.R. Christensen, High-resolution thermal-inertia mapping from the Mars Global Surveyor Thermal Emission Spectrometer, Icarus, 148, 437–455, In Press, 2000
- Ruff, S.W., P.R. Christensen, R.N. Clark, H.H. Kieffer, M.C. Malin, J.L. Bandfield, B.M. Jakosky, M.D. Lane, M.T. Mellon and M.A. Presley, Mars' "White Rock" feature lacks evidence of an aqueous origin: Results from Mars Global Surveyor, J. Geophys. Res., In Press, 2000
- Pelkey, S.M., B.M. Jakosky and M.T. Mellon, Thermal in inertia of crater-related wind streaks on Mars, J. Geophys. Res., Submitted, 2001
- Christensen, P.R., J.L. Bandfield, V.E. Hamilton, S.W. Ruff, H.H. Kieffer, T. Titus, M.C. Malin, R.V. Morris, M.D. Lane, R.L. Clark, B.M. Jakosky, M.T. Mellon, J.C. Pearl, B.J. Conrath, M.D. Smith, R.T. Clancy, R.O. Kuzmin, T. Roush, G.L. Mehall, N. Gorel, Mars Global Surveyor Thermal Emission Spectrometer experiment: Investigation description and surface science results, J. Geophys. Res., 106, 23,823-23,871, 2001
- Colwell, J.E. and B.M. Jakosky, Effects of topography on thermal infrared spectra of planetary surfaces, J. Geophys. Res., 107, No. E, 16–1 to 16–6, 10.1029/2001JE001829, 2001
- Jakosky, B.M. and M.T. Mellon, High-resolution thermal-inertia mapping of Mars: Sites of exobiological relevance, J. Geophys. Res., 106, 23,887-23,907, 2001
- Jakosky, B.M. and R.J. Phillips, Mars' volatile and climate history, Nature, 412, 237–244, 2001
- Jakosky, B.M., and M.T. Mellon, High-resolution thermal-inertia mapping of mars: Sites of exobiological relevance, J. Geophys. Res., 106, E10, 23,165-23,907, 2001
- Jakosky, B.M., and R.J. Phillips, Mars volatile and climate evolution: Water the major constraints?, Nature (Insight), 412, 6843, 237–244, 2001
- Lawson, S.L. and B.M. Jakosky, Lunar surface thermophysical properties derived from Clementine LWIR and UVVIS images, J. Geophys. Res., 106, 27911–27932, 2001
- Pelkey, S.M., B.M. Jakosky and M.T. Mellon, Thermal inertia of crater-related wind streaks on Mars, J. Geophys. Res., 106, E10, 23,909-23,920, 2001
- Phillips, R.J., M.T. Zuber, S.C. Solomon, M.P. Golombek, B.M. Jakosky, W.B. Banerdt, D. E. Smith, R.M.E. Williams, B.M. Hynek, O. Aharonson, and S.A. Hauck II, Ancient geodynamics and global-scale hydrology on Mars, Science, 291, 2587–2591, 2001
- Ruff, S.W., P.R. Christensen, R.N. Clark, H.H. Kieffer, M.C. Malin, J.L. Bandfield, B.M. Jakosky, M.D. Lane, M.T. Mellon, and M.A. Presley, Mars' White Rock feature lacks evidence of an aqueous origin: Results from Mars Global Surveyor, J. Geophys. Res., 106, 23,921-23,927, 2001
- Pelkey, S.M. and B.M. Jakosky, Surficial geologic surveys of Gale Crater and Melas Crater, Mars, Icarus, 160, 228–257, 2002
- Drake, M.J. and B.M. Jakosky, Narrow horizons in astrobiology, Nature, 415, 733–734, 2004
- Pelkey, S.M., B.M. Jakosky, and P.R. Christensen (2004). Surficial properties in Gale Crater, Mars, from Mars Odyssey THEMIS data, Icarus, 167, 244–270.
- Jakosky, B.M. and M.T. Mellon (2004). Water on Mars, Phys. Today, 57, 71–76.
- Jakosky, B.M., F. Westall, and A. Brack (2004). Mars, in Astrobiology (J. Baross and W. Sullivan, eds.), in press.
- Christensen, P.R., S.W. Ruff, R. Fergason, N. Gorelick, B.M. Jakosky, M.D. Lane, A.S. McEwen, H.Y. McSween, G.L. Mehall, K. Milam, J.E. Moersch, S.M. Pelkey, A.D. Rogers, and M.B. Wyatt (2005). Mars Exploration Rover candidate landing sites as viewed by THEMIS, Icarus, 176, 12–43.
- Solomon, S.C., O. Aharonson, J.M. Aurnou, W.B. Banerdt, M.H. Carr, A.J. Dombard, H.V. Frey, M.P. Golombek, S.A. Hauck II, J.W. Head III. B.M. Jakosky, C.L. Johnson, P.J. McGovern, G.A. Neumann, R.J. Phillips, D.E. Smith, and M.T. Zuber (2005). New perspectives on ancient Mars, Science, 307, 1214–1220.
- Jakosky, B.M., M.T. Mellon, E.S. Varnes, W.C. Feldman, W.V. Boynton, and R.M. Haberle (2005). Mars low-latitude neutron distribution: Possible remnant near-surface water ice and a mechanism for its recent emplacement, Icarus, 175, 58–67.
- Martinez-Alonso, S., B.M. Jakosky, M.T. Mellon, and N.E. Putzig (2005). A volcanic interpretation of Gusev Crater surface materials from thermophysical, spectral, and morphological evidence, J. Geophys. Res., 110, E01003, doi:10.1029/2004JE002327.
- Christensen, P.R., H.Y. McSween Jr., J. L. Bandfield, S.W. Ruff, A.D. Rogers, V.E. Hamilton, N. Gorelick, M. B. Wyatt, B.M. Jakosky, H. H. Kieffer, M.C. Malin, and J. E. Moersch (2005), Evidence for magmatic evolution and diversity on Mars from infrared observations, Nature, doi:10.1038/nature03639.
- Link, L.S., B.M. Jakosky, and G.D. Thyne (2005). Biological potential of low-temperature aqueous environments on Mars, Int. J. Astrobiology, 4, 155–164.
- Martinez-Alonso, S., M.T. Mellon, B.C. Kindel, and B.M. Jakosky (2006). Mapping compositional diversity on the surface of Mars: The spectral variance index, J. Geophys. Res., 111, 10.1029/2005JE002492.
- Chojnacki, M., B.M. Jakosky, and B.M. Hynek (2006). Surficial properties of landslides and surrounding units in Ophir Chasma, Mars, J. Geophys. Res., 111, E04005, doi:10.1029/2005JE002601
- Jakosky, B. M., B. M. Hynek, S. M. Pelkey, M. T. Mellon, S. Martínez-Alonso, N. E. Putzig, N. Murphy, and P. R. Christensen (2006). Thermophysical properties of the MER and Beagle II landing site regions on Mars, J. Geophys. Res., 111, E08008, doi:10.1029/2004JE002320.
- Des Marais, D.J., B.M. Jakosky, and B.M. Hynek (2006). Astrobiological implications of Mars surface composition and properties, in Mars Surface Composition, Mineralogy, and Physical Properties, J.F. Bell III, ed., Cambridge Univ. Press, in press.
