= Shannon Curry =

American planetary physicist

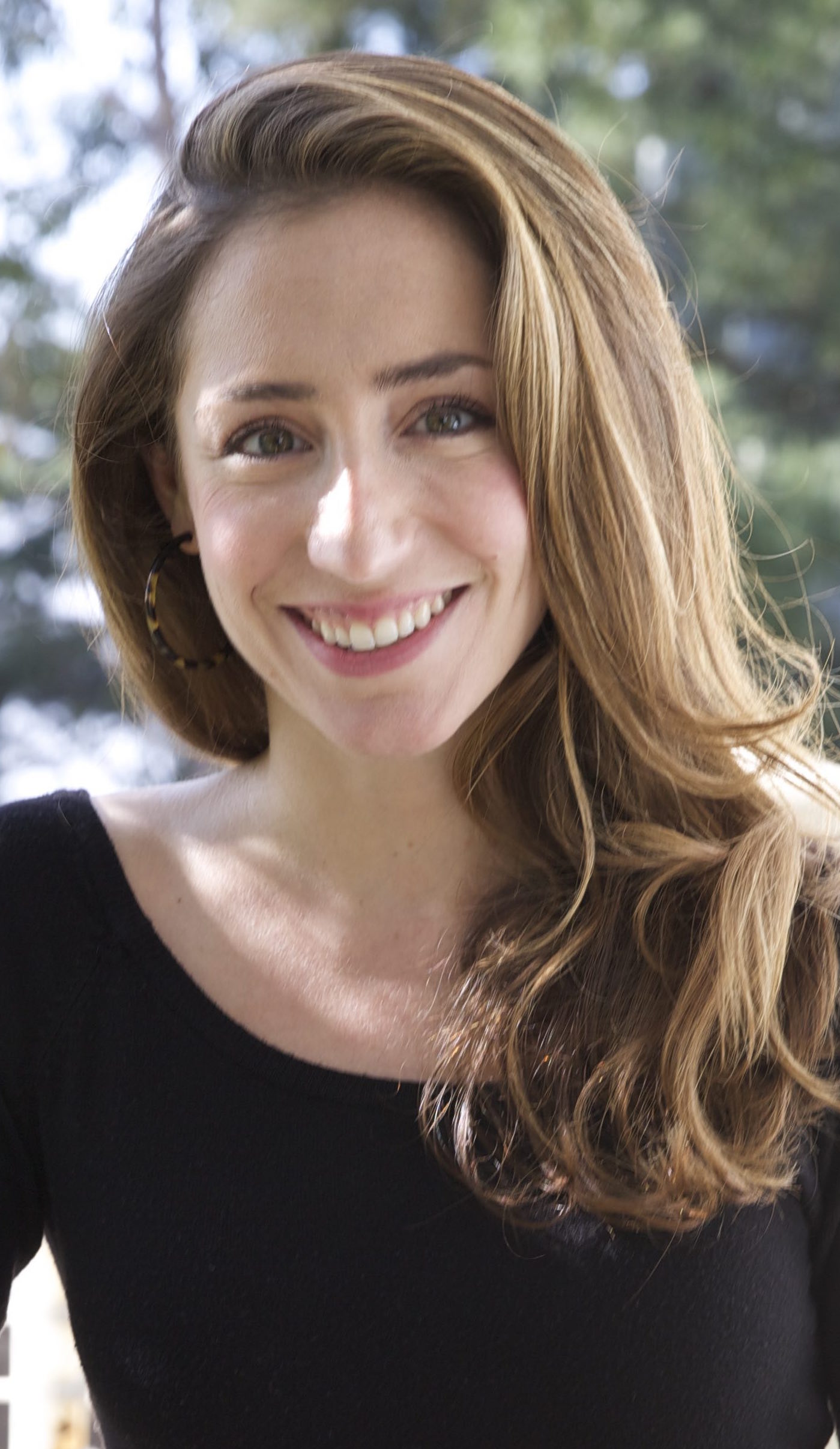
- Curry in 2015
- Citizenship: United States
- Education: B.S., Tufts University; M.S., University of Michigan; Ph.D., University of Michigan
- Occupation: Planetary scientist
- Employer: University of Colorado Boulder
- Known for: planetary atmospheres, Mars exploration, Venus exploration, atmospheric escape, planetary science, plasma physics

Shannon Curry is a planetary physicist and the Principal Investigator of the NASA Mars Scout mission MAVEN (Mars Atmosphere and Volatile Evolution). Curry is an associate professor at the University of Colorado, Boulder in the Astrophysics and Planetary Sciences (APS) Department as well as a researcher at the Laboratory for Atmospheric and Space Physics (LASP). Prior to this, she served as the Deputy Assistant Director of Planetary Science at the Space Sciences Laboratory at the University of California, Berkeley.

== Education ==
Curry received her Bachelors of Science from Tufts University in astrophysics. Following, she received a fellowship through NASA's Graduate Student Researchers Program (GSRP) and completed her Ph.D at the University of Michigan in 2013; her thesis was titled "Test Particle Analysis of High Altitude Ion Transport and Escape on Mars".

== Research and career ==
Curry's research focus is on terrestrial planetary atmospheres, primarily in atmospheric escape and dynamics at Mars, Venus and other weakly magnetized bodies.

She is involved in instrument development and mission concept development for future flight exploration of the Solar System. Her research uses statistics, applied mathematics, modeling and machine learning in order to better understand spacecraft observations of the solar system. Before completing her Ph.D., she was a systems engineer at Lockheed Martin.

In 2020, Curry participated in two Planetary Mission Concept Studies as part of NASA's preparations for the 2023 Planetary Science Decadal Survey: MOSAIC (a mission concept at Mars) and the Venus Flagship Mission Concept.

Curry also leads the science campaigns for the Venus gravity assists performed by the Parker Solar Probe spacecraft and is a collaborator on NASA's Nexus for Exoplanet System Science (NExSS) program.

She is the Project Scientist on the SIMPLEx mission EscaPADE, which is a spacecraft mission to Mars consisting of two spacecraft which launched in November 2025 to study the Martian magnetosphere.

In 2021, she succeeded Bruce Jakosky as the principal investigator for the MAVEN mission, which launched in 2013 and orbits Mars to study the loss of atmospheric gases to space, providing insight into the history of the planet's climate and water.

In 2022, Curry began serving on NASA's Planetary Advisory Committee.
