= 2010 XG11 =

Near-Earth asteroid

2010 XG_{11}
Discovery
- Discovered by: Catalina Sky Survey (703)
- Discovery date: 5 December 2010

Designations
- Minor planet category: Amor NEO

Orbital characteristics
- Epoch 21 November 2025 (JD 2461000.5)
- Uncertainty parameter 0
- Observation arc: 11,109 days (30.41 yr)
- Aphelion: 2.1734 AU (325.14 Gm) (Q)
- Perihelion: 1.1350 AU (169.79 Gm) (q)
- Semi-major axis: 1.6542 AU (247.46 Gm) (a)
- Eccentricity: 0.31384 (e)
- Orbital period (sidereal): 2.13 yr (777.12 d)
- Mean anomaly: 59.973° (M)
- Mean motion: 0° 27^{m} 47.7^{s} /day (n)
- Inclination: 25.134° (i)
- Longitude of ascending node: 256.00° (Ω)
- Argument of perihelion: 87.840° (ω)
- Earth MOID: 0.353588 AU (52.8960 Gm)
- Jupiter MOID: 3.44234 AU (514.967 Gm)

Physical characteristics
- Dimensions: ~270 – 590 meters
- Apparent magnitude: 19.3 – 24.9
- Absolute magnitude (H): 20.03

2010 XG_{11} is an Amor near-Earth asteroid. It was discovered on 5 December 2010 by the Catalina Sky Survey at an apparent magnitude of 19.7 using a 0.68-meter (27 in) Schmidt–Cassegrain telescope. Three precovery images are known from 1 July 1995. With an observation arc of 30.4 years, the orbit is well determined with an orbital uncertainty of 0. With an absolute magnitude of 20.03, the asteroid is about 270–590 meters in diameter.

With a Mars-minimum orbit intersection distance of 0.0016 AU (240,000 km; 150,000 mi), the asteroid currently makes closer approaches to Mars than it does Earth. On 29 July 2014 the asteroid passed 0.00805 AU (1,204,000 km; 748,000 mi) from Mars.
