= McCuistion =

McCuistion is a surname. Notable people with the surname include:

- Doug McCuistion, American scientist

== See also ==
- McCuistion Glacier, a glacier in Antarctica
