= Peter Theisinger =

American engineer (1945–2024)

Peter Charles Theisinger
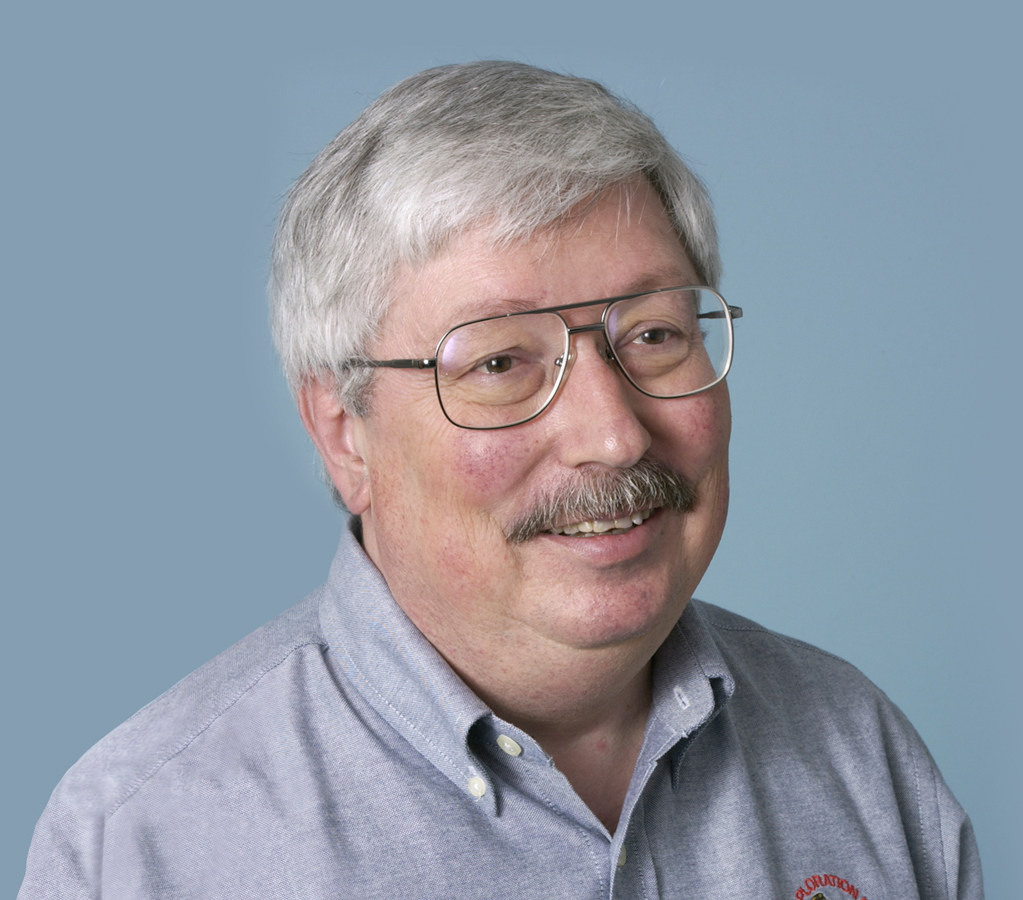
- Born: August 7, 1945; Fresno, California, U.S.
- Died: June 26, 2024 (aged 78); La Crescenta, California, U.S.
- Education: California Institute of Technology
- Occupation: Engineer
- Employer: Jet Propulsion Laboratory
- Known for: Project manager of NASA's Mars Exploration Rover Mission and Mars Science Laboratory mission

Peter Charles Theisinger (August 7, 1945 – June 26, 2024) was the director of the Engineering and Science Directorate at the Jet Propulsion Laboratory in Pasadena, California and was the project manager of NASA's Mars Exploration Rover Mission and later project manager for the 2011 Mars Science Laboratory mission.

Theisinger was born in Fresno, California in 1945 and graduated from the California Institute of Technology in 1967 with a bachelor's degree in physics. He joined NASA's Jet Propulsion Laboratory (JPL) as payload integration engineer that year and except for a three-year span in the early 1980s has worked at JPL since. Among the missions on which he has participated were the 1967 Mariner 5 flyby mission to Venus, the 1971 Mariner 9 orbiter mission to Mars, the Voyager mission to the outer planets of the Solar System, the Galileo mission to Jupiter, and the Mars Global Surveyor orbiter.

In 2013, Theisinger, along with Richard Cook, was named one of Time magazine's 100 Most Influential People in the World as a pioneer for his role in getting the Curiosity rover to Mars safely in August 2012.

Theisinger died in La Crescenta, California from throat cancer on June 26, 2024, at the age of 78.
