= Year of the Solar System =

The Year of the Solar System was a NASA education/public outreach initiative. The year ran October 2010 until August 2012, a Martian year.

== Background ==
During that Martian year, there were a lot of major events that were being planned for solar system exploration. These events were: Deep Impact's flyby of comet Hartley 2, the arrival of Dawn to asteroid Vesta, the launch of the Mars Science Laboratory which included the Curiosity rover, the launch of the Russian Phobos Sample Return (unsuccessful, never got out of Earth orbit), the launch of Juno, the launch of GRAIL and its arrival to moon orbit, Akatsuki entering Venus orbit (unsuccessful, managed to enter orbit later, in 2015), MESSENGER's arrival into Mercury orbit and Stardust's encounter with the comet Tempel-1.

== Monthly Topics ==
For each month's topic there are resources for clubs, schools and the general public. The months/topics were:

- October 2010: The Journey Begins
- November 2010: Birth of Worlds
- Dec 2010/Jan 2011: A Family Affair
- February 2011: Small Bodies—Big Impacts
- March 2011: Ancient Astronomers/Modern Tools: Celebrating Sun-Earth Day
- April 2011: Water, Water, Everywhere!
- May 2011: Volcanism!
- June 2011: Impacts!
- July 2011: Rocks in Space
- August 2011: Windy Worlds
- September 2011: Gravity: It's What Keeps Us Together
- October 2011: Moons and Rings: Our Favorite Things
- November 2011: Magnetospheres: Planetary Shields
- Dec 2011/Jan 2012: Evolving Worlds
- February 2012: Far-Ranging Robots
- March 2012: Shadows of the Sun
- April 2012: Ice!
- May 2012: New Data, New Ideas
- Jun/Jul 2012: Got Life?
- August 2012: Discovering New Worlds

The Year of the Solar System was supported by NASA's Science Mission Directorate and its Planetary Science Division.
