= Doug McCuistion =

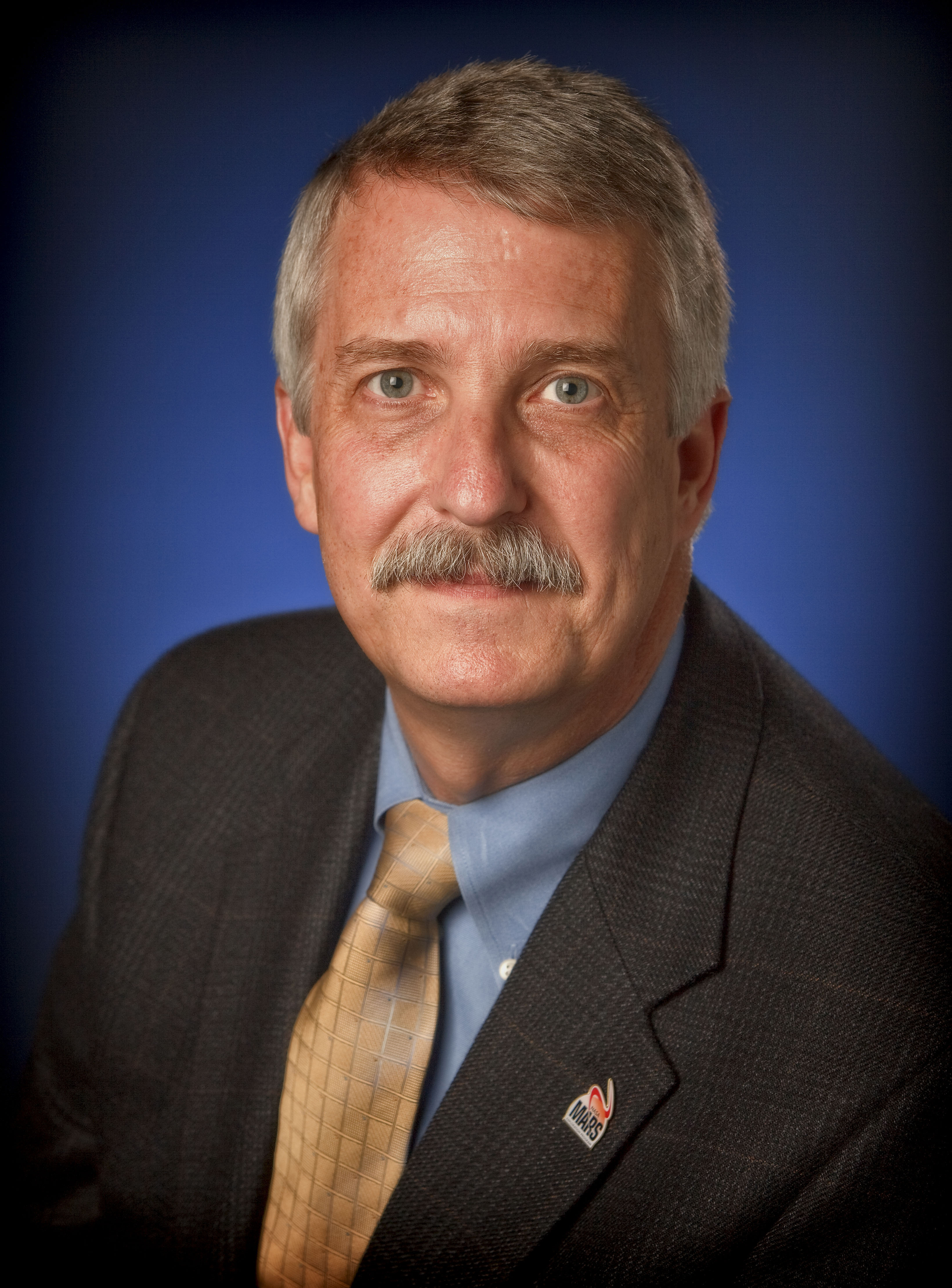
- Scientific career
- Fields: Science; Management; Astronomy
- Institutions: U.S. Navy; National Aeronautics and Space Administration

Doug McCuistion is the former director of NASA's Mars Exploration Program. He is now the chief operating officer of X-Energy, LLC, a nuclear energy company developing high-temperature gas-cooled reactors located in Rockville, Maryland. Doug McCuistion is a graduate of the United States Navy Fighter Weapons School, famously known as TOPGUN.

== Career ==
McCuistion was NASA's third and longest-running "Mars Czar", leading the NASA Mars Exploration Program from NASA Headquarters for 8.5 years. Under his leadership the Mars Reconnaissance Orbtier (MRO), Phoenix Lander, and Mars Science Laboratory/Curiosity rover were completed and launched, and the MAVEN mission nearly ready for its 2013 launch. He led expansive international program efforts during his tenure, including a multi-national Mars Sample Return study called iMARS, and a merging of the NASA and European Space Agency's (ESA) Mars programs (which was later dissolved due to US financial constraints). Prior to his taking the helm of the NASA Mars Exploration Program, he was the director of flight programs for NASA's Earth Science Enterprise. Prior to coming to NASA Headquarters McCuistion held management and engineering positions in Earth and space science at the Goddard Space Flight Center, working on the Tracking and Data Relay Satellite (TDRS), Geosynchronous Operations Environmental Satellite (GOES), Landsat, NEXUS (a James Webb Space Telescope precursor), and as a deputy director in the Information Systems engineering division. Prior to his career at NASA, McCuistion was a commissioned officer in the U. S. Navy flying F-14 Tomcats and worked on the Navy's Geodetic Satellite (GEOSAT) Follow-On mission. He retired from the U. S. Navy at the rank of commander in 1998. He has written about international collaboration in Mars exploration and education and public outreach efforts in planetary science. One example is Year of the Solar System.

== Awards and honors ==
McCuistion has been recognized with the rank of Meritorious Senior Executive, and was awarded two NASA Exceptional Achievement Medals, two Navy Commendation Medals, and a variety of NASA, Navy, and other agency individual and group achievement awards.
