= Mars 2018 mission =

Mars 2018 mission may refer to:

- Mars Astrobiology Explorer-Cacher (MAX-C), a cancelled NASA Mars rover mission
- ExoMars, a robotic mission to Mars under development by the European Space Agency
