= Astrobiology Field Laboratory =

Canceled NASA Mars rover concept

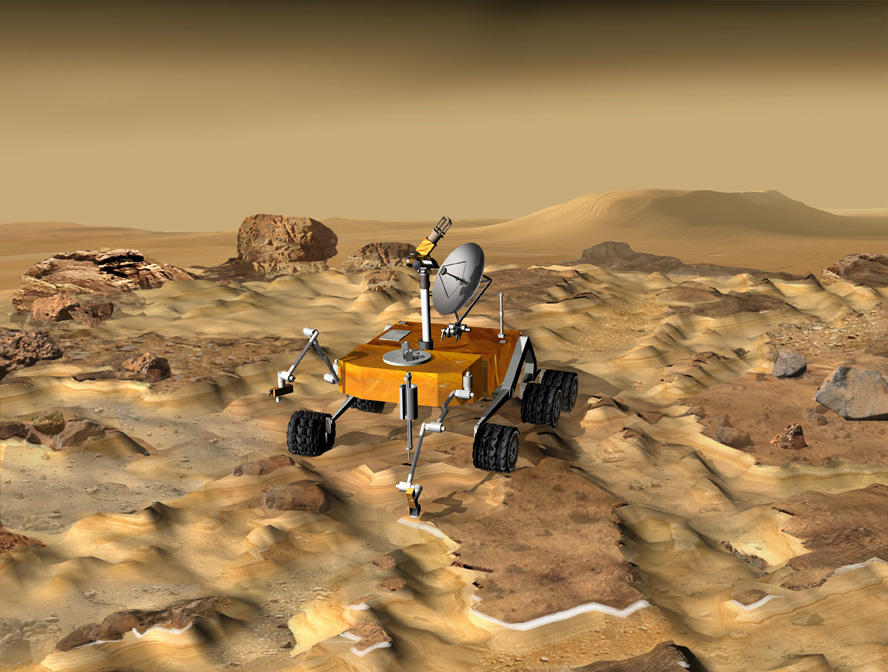
- Astrobiology Field Laboratory
- Mission type: Astrobiology rover
- Operator: NASA
- Website: at jpl.nasa.gov (recovered from archive)
- Mission duration: 1 Martian year (proposed)

Spacecraft properties
- Launch mass: 450 kg (990 lb) maximum

Start of mission
- Launch date: 2016 (proposed)

The Astrobiology Field Laboratory (AFL) (also Mars Astrobiology Field Laboratory or MAFL) was a proposed NASA rover that would have conducted a search for life on Mars. This proposed mission, which was not funded, would have landed a rover on Mars in 2016 and explore a site for habitat. Examples of such sites are an active or extinct hydrothermal deposit, a dry lake or a specific polar site.

Had it been funded, the rover was to be built by NASA's Jet Propulsion Laboratory, based upon the Mars Science Laboratory rover design, it would have carried astrobiology-oriented instruments, and ideally, a core drill. The original plans called for a launch in 2016, however, budgetary constraints caused funding cuts.

== Mission ==
The rover could have been the first mission since the Viking program landers of the 1970s to specifically look for the chemistry associated with life (biosignatures), such as carbon-based compounds along with molecules involving both sulfur and nitrogen. The mission strategy was to search for habitable zones by "following the water" and "finding the carbon." In particular, it was to conduct detailed analysis of geologic environments identified by the 2012 Mars Science Laboratory as being conducive to life on Mars and biosignatures, past and present. Such environments might include fine-grained sedimentary layers, hot spring mineral deposits, icy layers near the poles, or sites such as gullies where liquid water once flowed or may continue to seep into soils from melting ice packs.

== Planning ==
The Astrobiology Field Laboratory (AFL) would have followed the Mars Reconnaissance Orbiter (launched in 2005), Phoenix lander (launched in 2007), and Mars Science Laboratory (launched in 2011). The AFL 'Science Steering Group' developed the following set of search strategies and assumptions for increasing the likelihood of detecting biosignatures:

1. Life processes may produce a range of biosignatures such as lipids, proteins, amino acids, kerogen-like material or characteristic micropores in rock. However, the biosignatures themselves may become progressively destroyed by ongoing environmental processes.
2. Sample acquisition will need to be executed in multiple locations and at depths below that point on the Martian surface where oxidation results in chemical alteration. The surface is oxidizing as a consequence of the absence of magnetic field or magnetosphere shielding from harmful space radiation and solar electromagnetic radiation —which may well render the surface sterile down to a depth greater than 7.5 meters (24.6 ft). To get under that potential sterile layer, a core drill design is currently being studied. As with any trade, the inclusion of the drill would come at the mass expense available for other payload elements.
3. Analytical laboratory biosignature measurements require the pre-selection and identification of high-priority samples, which could be subsequently subsampled to maximize detection probability and spatially resolve potential biosignatures for detailed analysis.

== Payload ==
The conceptual payload included a Precision Sample Handling and Processing System to replace and augment the functionality and capabilities provided by the Sample Acquisition Sample Processing and Handling system that was part of the 2009-configuration of Mars Science Laboratory rover (the system is known as SAM (Sample Analysis at Mars) in 2011-configuration of Mars Science Laboratory). The AFL payload was to attempt to minimize any conflicting positive detection of life by including a suite of instruments that provide at least three mutually confirming analytical laboratory measurements.

For the purpose of discerning a reasonable estimate on which to base the rover mass, the conceptual payload was to include:

- Precision Sample Handling and Processing System.
- Forward Planetary Protection for Life-Detection Mission to a Special Region.
- Life Detection-Contamination Avoidance.
- Astrobiology Instrument Development.
- MSL Parachute Enhancement.
- Autonomous safe long-distance travel.
- Autonomous single-cycle instrument placement.
- Pinpoint landing (100–1000 m) (if necessary to reach specific science targets in hazardous regions).
- Mobility for highly sloped terrain 30° (if required to reach science targets).

== Power source ==
It was suggested that the Astrobiology Field Laboratory use radioisotope thermoelectric generators (RTGs) as its power source, like the ones to be used on the Mars Science Laboratory. The radioactive RTG power source was to last for about one Martian year, or approximately two Earth years. RTGs can provide reliable, continuous power day and night, and waste heat can be used via pipes to warm systems, freeing electrical power for the operation of the vehicle and instruments.

== Science ==
Though the AFL science justification did not include a pre-definition of potential life forms that might be found on Mars, the following assumptions were made:

1. Life utilizes some form of carbon.
2. Life requires an external energy source (sunlight or chemical energy) to survive.
3. Life is packaged in cellular-type compartments (cells).
4. Life requires liquid water.

Within the region of surface operations, identify and classify Martian environments (past or present) with different habitability potential, and characterize their geologic context. Quantitatively assess habitability potential by:

- Measuring isotopic, chemical, mineralogical, and structural characteristics of samples, including the distribution and molecular complexity of carbon compounds.
- Assessing biologically available sources of energy, including chemical, thermal and electromagnetic.
- Determining the role of water (past or present) in the geological processes at the landing site.
- Investigate the factors that will affect the preservation of potential signs of life (past or present) This refers to the potential for a particular biosignature to survive and therefore be detected in a particular habitat. Also, post-collection preservation may be required for later sample retrieval, although that would necessitate a further assessment of precision landing of the Mars sample return mission.
- Investigate the possibility of prebiotic chemistry on Mars, including non-carbon biochemistry.
- Document any anomalous features that can be hypothesized as possible Martian biosignatures.

It is fundamental to the AFL concept to understand that organisms and their environment constitute a system, within which any one part can affect the other. If life exists or has existed on Mars, scientific measurements to be considered would focus on understanding those systems that support or supported it. If life never existed while conditions were suitable for life formation, understanding why a Martian genesis never occurred would be a future priority. The AFL team stated that it is reasonable to expect that missions like AFL will play a significant role in this process, but unreasonable to expect that they will bring it to a conclusion.

== See also ==
- Astrobiology – Science concerned with life in the universe
- ExoMars – Astrobiology programme
- Exploration of Mars
- Life on Mars – Assessments of possible life on Mars
- Mars 2020 – Astrobiology Mars rover mission by NASA
- Mars Astrobiology Explorer-Cacher – Cancelled NASA Mars rover concept
- Curiosity (rover) – NASA robotic rover exploring Gale crater on Mars
- Viking program – Pair of NASA landers and orbiters sent to Mars in 1976
