= Altec =

Altec may refer to:

- Altec Lansing, an American audio electronics company
- Aerospace Logistics Technology Engineering Company (ALTEC), an Italian center for engineering and logistics services
- Latin American Alliance for Civic Technology (ALTEC), founded in part by Omidyar Network
- Altec Industries, Inc., Alabama Truck & Equipment Company. Altec is a provider of equipment and services to the electric utility, telecommunications, tree care, lights and signs, and contractor markets.
