= ExoMars =

Astrobiology programme of the European Space Agency

- Artist's illustration of ExoMars's Trace Gas Orbiter (left), Schiaparelli lander (middle), and rover (right)
- Mission type: Mars reconnaissance
- Operator: ESA, Roscosmos (until 2022)
- Website: www.esa.int/exomars (ESA)
- Mission duration: Trace Gas Orbiter: 10 years, 8 months and 3 days (in progress); Schiaparelli: 7 months
- ESA insignia (2020s)

ExoMars (Exobiology on Mars) is an astrobiology programme of the European Space Agency (ESA) composed of the Trace Gas Orbiter (TGO), the Schiaparelli lander, and a future rover Rosalind Franklin. The goals of ExoMars are to search for signs of past life on Mars, investigate how the Martian water and geochemical environment varies, investigate atmospheric trace gases and their sources and, by doing so, demonstrate the technologies for a future Mars sample-return mission.

The first part of the programme is a mission launched in 2016. TGO and a test stationary lander called Schiaparelli (designed to test new key technologies to safely deliver the subsequent rover mission) were launched on 14 March 2016. TGO entered Mars orbit on 19 October 2016, and proceeded to map the sources of methane (CH_{4}) and other trace gases present in the Martian atmosphere that could be evidence for possible biological or geological activity. The TGO features four instruments and acts as a communications relay satellite. The Schiaparelli experimental lander separated from TGO on 16 October and was maneuvered to land in Meridiani Planum, but it crashed on the surface of Mars.

The second part of the programme was planned to launch in early 2020s, when a Russian lander named Kazachok was due to deliver the ESA's Rosalind Franklin rover to the Martian surface. The rover would also include some Roscosmos built instruments. On 17 March 2022, ESA suspended the mission due to the ongoing invasion of Ukraine by Russia. In April 2024, the mission received new funding to restart construction and delivery of the Rosalind Franklin rover using a new European landing platform and NASA has agreed to provide the launch, currently scheduled for late 2028. The second mission operations and communications will be led by ALTEC's Rover Control Centre in Italy.

== History ==
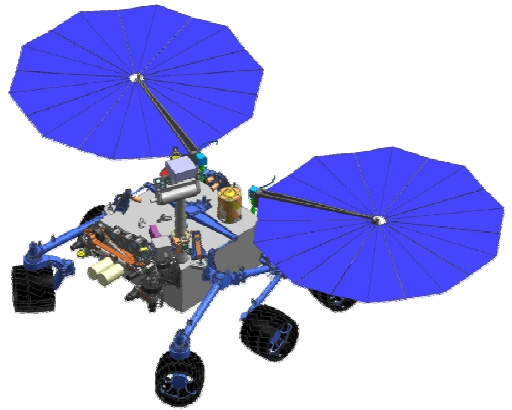
Concept of MAX-C rover

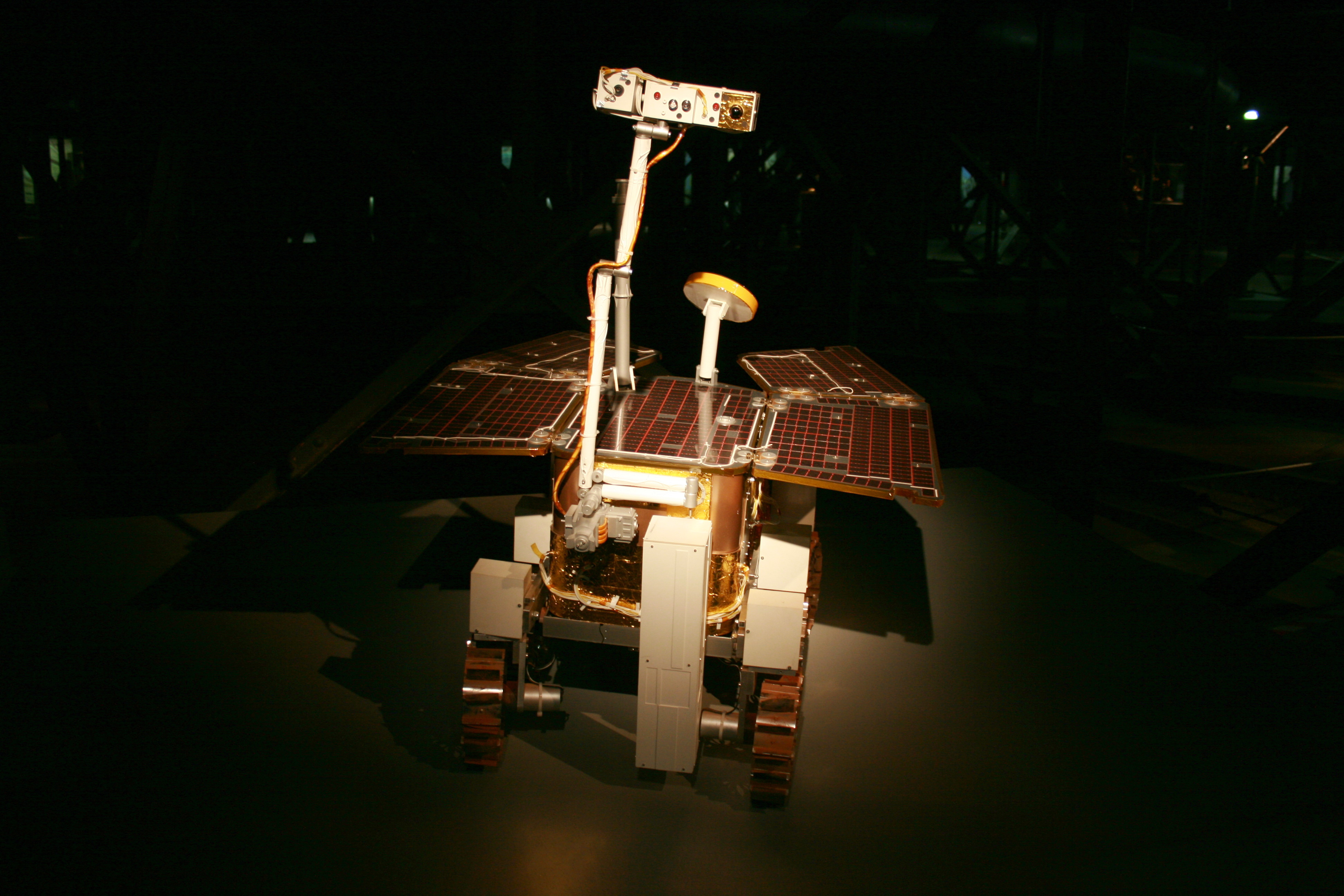
ExoMars rover at exhibit in Gasometer Oberhausen, Germany (2009)

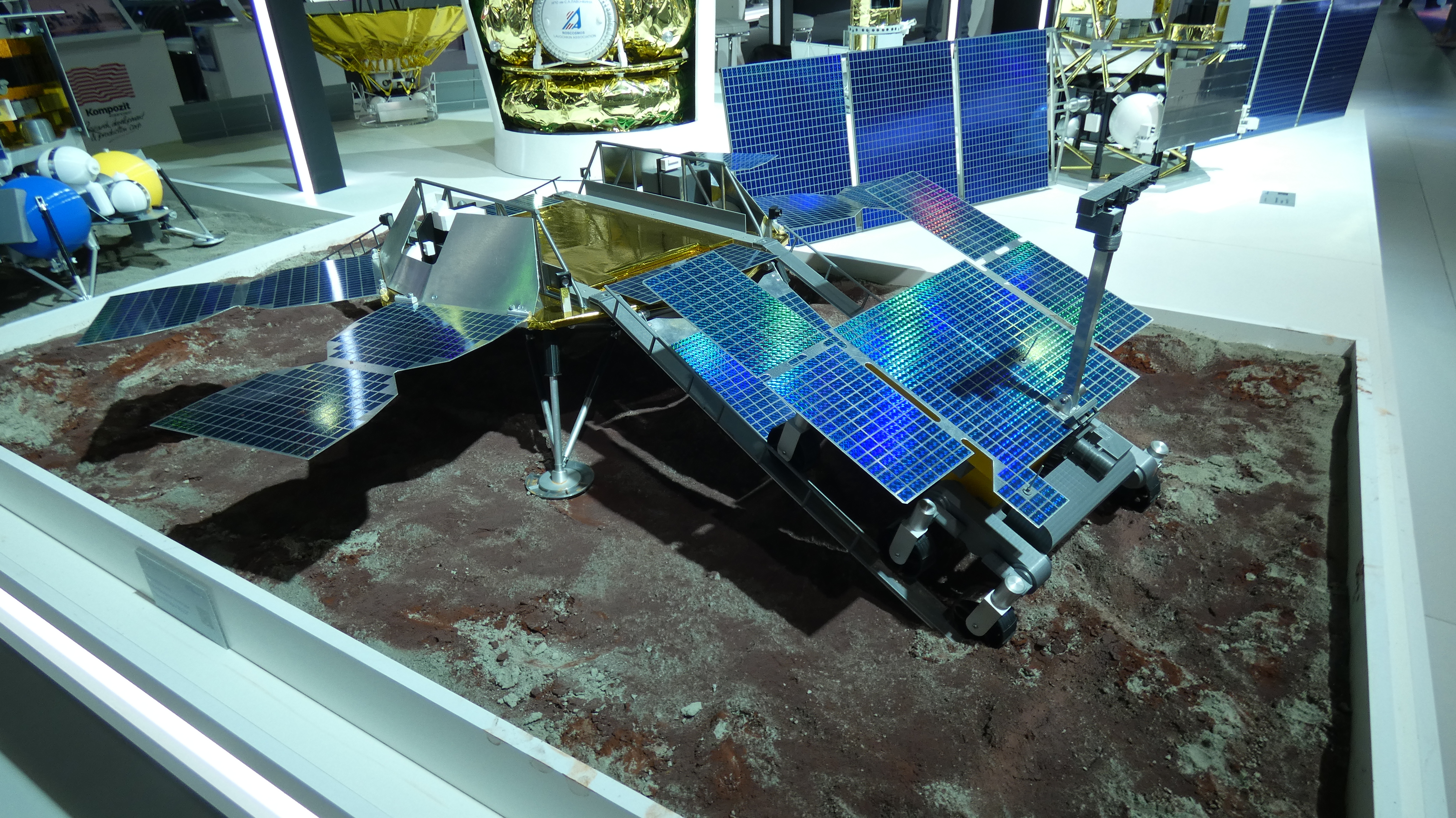
ExoMars rover at MAKS-2021

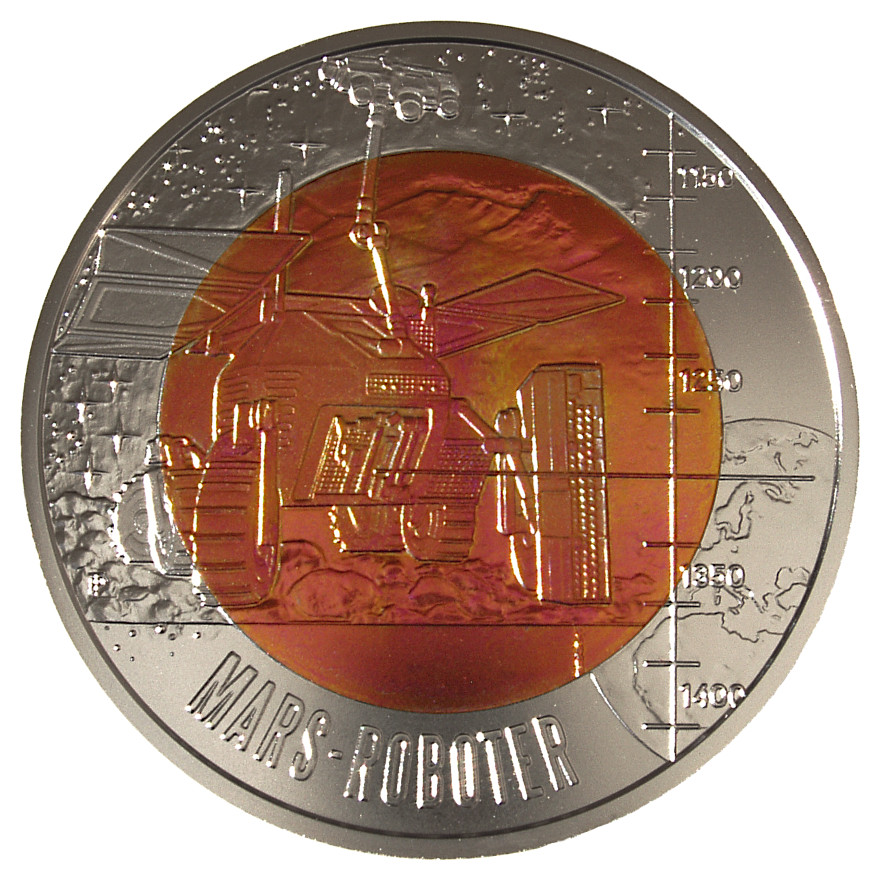
Austrian 25 Euro, released in 2011

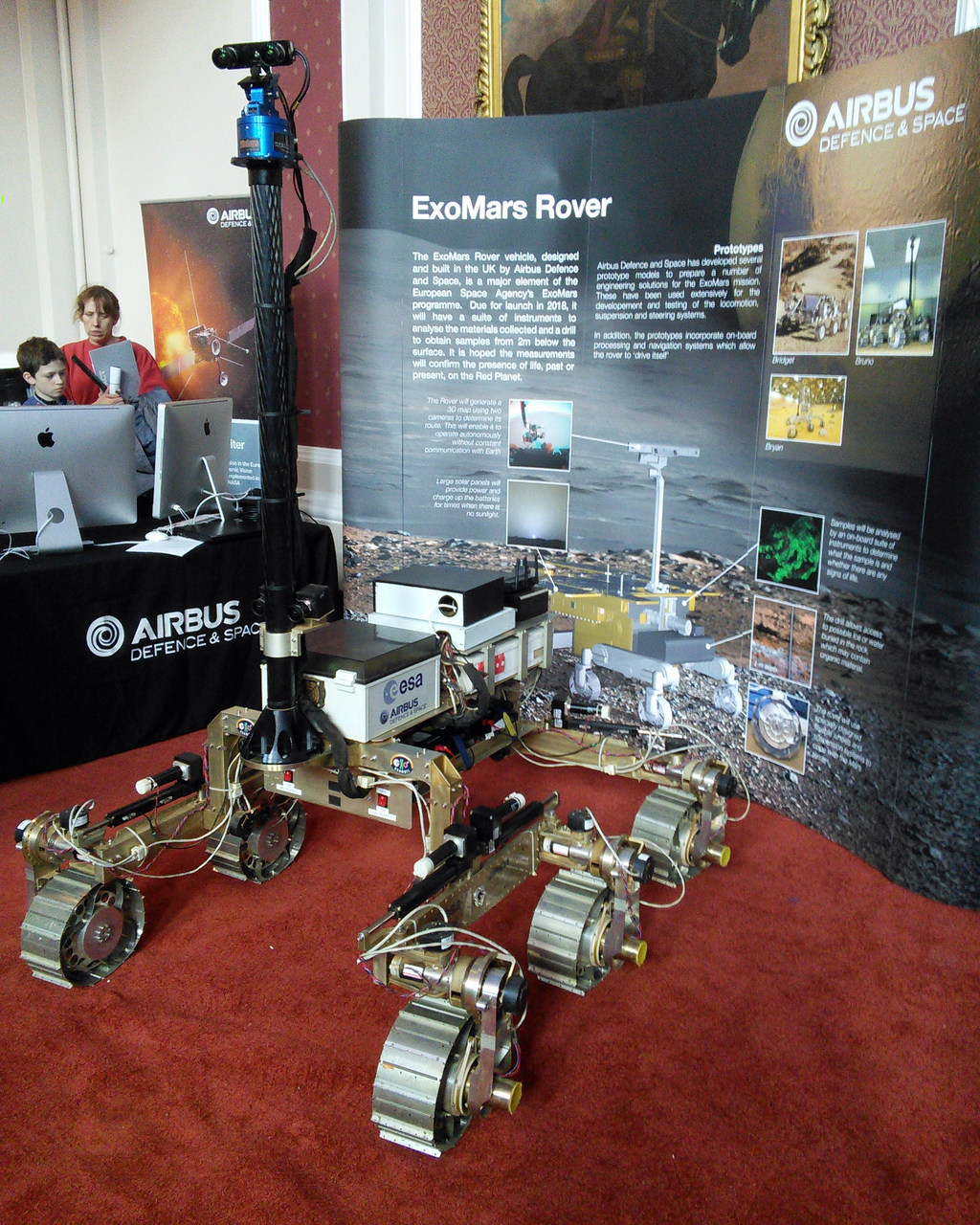
A prototype of the ExoMars Rover at the 2015 Cambridge Science Festival

Since its inception, ExoMars has gone through several phases of planning with various proposals for landers, orbiters, launch vehicles, and international cooperation planning, such as the defunct 2009 Mars Exploration Joint Initiative (MEJI) with the United States. Originally, the ExoMars concept consisted of a large robotic rover being part of ESA's Aurora Programme as a Flagship mission and was approved by the European Space Agency ministers in December 2005. Originally conceived as a rover with a stationary ground station, ExoMars was planned to launch in 2011 aboard a Russian Soyuz Fregat rocket.

ExoMars began in 2001 as part of the ESA Aurora program for the human exploration of Mars. That initial vision called for rover in 2009 and later a Mars sample-return mission. Another mission intended to support the Aurora program is a Phobos sample return mission. In December 2005, the different nations composing the ESA gave approval to the Aurora program and to ExoMars. Aurora is an optional program and each state is allowed to decide which part of the program they want to be involved in and to what extent (e.g. how much funds they want to put into the program). The Aurora program was initiated in 2002 with support of twelve nations: Austria, Belgium, France, Germany, Italy, the Netherlands, Portugal, Spain, Sweden, Switzerland, the United Kingdom and Canada

In 2007, Canadian-based technology firm MacDonald Dettwiler and Associates Ltd. (MDA) was selected for a one-million-euro contract with EADS Astrium of Britain to design and build a prototype Mars rover chassis for the European Space Agency. Astrium was also contracted to design the final rover.

=== Cooperation with NASA ===
In July 2009 NASA and ESA signed the Mars Exploration Joint Initiative, which proposed to use an Atlas rocket launcher instead of a Soyuz, which significantly altered the technical and financial setting of the ExoMars mission. On 19 June, when the rover was still planned to piggyback the Mars Trace Gas Orbiter, it was reported that a prospective agreement would require that ExoMars lose enough weight to fit aboard the Atlas launch vehicle with a NASA orbiter.

Then the mission was combined with other projects to a multi-spacecraft mission divided over two Atlas V-launches: the ExoMars Trace Gas Orbiter (TGO) was merged into the project, piggybacking a stationary meteorological lander slated for launch in January 2016. It was also proposed to include a second rover, the MAX-C.

In August 2009 it was announced that the Russian Federal Space Agency (now Roscosmos) and ESA had signed a contract that included cooperation on two Mars exploration projects: Russia's Fobos-Grunt project and ESA's ExoMars. Specifically, ESA secured a Russian Proton rocket as a "backup launcher" for the ExoMars rover, which would include Russian-made parts.

On 17 December 2009, the ESA governments gave their final approval to a two-part Mars exploration mission to be conducted with NASA, confirming their commitment to spend €850 million ($1.23 billion) on missions in 2016 and 2018.

In April 2011, because of a budgeting crisis, a proposal was announced to cancel the accompanying MAX-C rover, and fly only one rover in 2018 that would be larger than either of the vehicles in the paired concept. One suggestion was that the new vehicle would be built in Europe and carry a mix of European and U.S. instruments. NASA would provide the rocket to deliver it to Mars and provide the sky crane landing system. Despite the proposed reorganisation, the goals of the 2018 mission opportunity would have stayed broadly the same.

Under the FY2013 Budget President Obama released on 13 February 2012, NASA terminated its participation in ExoMars due to budgetary cuts to pay for the cost overruns of the James Webb Space Telescope. With NASA's funding for this project completely cancelled, most of these plans had to be restructured.

=== Cooperation with Russia ===
On 14 March 2013, representatives of the ESA and the Russian space agency (Roscosmos), signed a deal in which Russia became a full partner. Roscosmos would supply both missions with Proton launch vehicles with Briz-M upper stages and launch services, as well as an additional entry, descent and landing module for the rover mission in 2018. Under the agreement, Roscosmos was granted three asking conditions:

- Roscosmos would contribute two Proton launch vehicles as payment for the partnership.
- The Trace Gas Orbiter payload shall include two Russian instruments that were originally developed for Fobos-Grunt.
- All scientific results must be intellectual property of the European Space Agency and the Russian Academy of Sciences (i.e. Roscosmos would have been be part of all the project teams and would have had full access to research data).

ESA had originally cost-capped the ExoMars projects at €1 billion, (USD 1.3 billion) but the withdrawal of the U.S. space agency (NASA) and the consequent reorganisation of the ventures added several hundred million euros to the sum so far raised. So in March 2012, member states instructed the agency's executive to look at how this shortfall could be made up. One possibility was that other science activities within ESA may have to step back to make ExoMars a priority. In September 2012 it was announced that new ESA members, Poland and Romania, would be contributing up to €70 million to the ExoMars mission. ESA has not ruled out a possible partial return of NASA to the 2018 portion of ExoMars, albeit in a relatively minor role.

Russia's financing of ExoMars was to be partially covered by insurance payments of 1.2 billion roubles (US$40.7 million) for the loss of Fobos-Grunt, and reassigning funds for a possible coordination between the Mars-NET and ExoMars projects. On 25 January 2013, Roscosmos fully funded the development of the scientific instruments to be flown on the first launch, the Trace Gas Orbiter (TGO).

By March 2014, the lead builder of the ExoMars rover, the British division of Airbus Defence and Space, had started procuring critical components, but the 2018 rover mission was still short by more than 100 million euros, or $138 million. The wheels and suspension system are paid by the Canadian Space Agency and are being manufactured by MDA Corporation in Canada.

=== First launch in 2016 ===
The spacecraft containing ExoMars Trace Gas Orbiter (TGO) and Schiaparelli launched on 14 March 2016 09:31 UTC (Livestream began at 08:30 GMT). Four rocket burns occurred in the following 10 hours before the descent module and orbiter were released. Signals from the Orbiter were successfully received at 21:29 GMT of the same day, which confirmed that the launch was fully successful and that the spacecraft was on its way to Mars. Shortly after separation from the probes, the Briz-M upper booster stage possibly exploded a few kilometers away, however apparently without damaging the orbiter or lander. The spacecraft, which housed the Trace Gas Orbiter and the Schiaparelli lander, took its nominal orbit towards Mars and was seemingly in working order. Over the next two weeks, controllers continued to check and commission its systems, including the power, communications, startrackers, and guidance and navigation system.

=== Delays and suspension ===
In January 2016 it was announced that the financial situation of the 2018 mission 'might' require a 2-year delay. Italy is the largest contributor to ExoMars, and the UK is the mission's second-largest financial backer. The rover was scheduled to launch in 2018 and land on Mars in early 2019, but in May 2016 ESA announced that the launch would occur in 2020 due to delays in European and Russian industrial activities and deliveries of the scientific payload.

On 12 March 2020, it was announced that the second mission was being delayed to launch in 2022 due to the vehicle not being ready for launch in 2020, with delays exacerbated by travel restrictions during the COVID-19 pandemic.

On 28 February 2022, it was announced that the second mission launching in 2022 "was very unlikely" due to the sanctions on Russia in response to the invasion of Ukraine by Russia. On 17 March 2022, the launch of ExoMars in the 2022 launch window was abandoned, with the permanent suspension of the partnership with Roscosmos. However, in November, the European Space Agency member states pledged 360 million euros towards the Rosalind Franklin rover, including covering the cost of replacing Russian components. Now planned to launch in 2028, the rover will carry a next-generation mass spectrometer, the Mars Organic Molecule Analyzer, or MOMA.

=== Restart ===
In June 2024, a $567 million contract was awarded to Thales Alenia Space to complete the assembly, integration, and testing of the landing platform for Rosalind Franklin, with mechanical, thermal, and propulsion handled by Airbus Defense and Space, and ArianeGroup providing the heat shield. On 16 April 2024, ESA announced a memorandum of understanding with NASA to provide the launch service in late 2028, and that the next mission milestone is the preliminary design review in June 2024.

== Objectives ==
The scientific objectives, in order of priority, are:

- to search for possible biosignatures of past Martian life.
- to characterise the water and geochemical distribution as a function of depth in the shallow subsurface.
- to study the surface environment and identify hazards to future human missions to Mars.
- to investigate the planet's subsurface and deep interior to better understand the evolution and habitability of Mars.
- achieve incremental steps ultimately culminating in a sample return flight.

The technological objectives to develop are:

- landing of large payloads on Mars.
- to exploit solar electric power on the surface of Mars.
- to access the subsurface with a drill able to collect samples down to a depth of 2 metres (6.6 ft)
- to develop surface exploration capability using a rover.

== Mission profile ==
ExoMars is a joint programme of the European Space Agency (ESA). According to current plans, the ExoMars project will comprise one orbiter (the Trace Gas Orbiter) and one rover. The landing module and the rover will be cleaned and sterilised to prevent contaminating Mars with Earth life forms, and also to ensure that any biomolecules detected were not carried from Earth. Cleaning will require a combination of sterilising methods, including ionising radiation, UV radiation, and chemicals such as ethyl and isopropyl alcohol. (see Planetary protection).

| Contributing agency | First launch in 2016 | Second launch in 2028 |
|---|---|---|
| Roscosmos | Launch by Proton rocket | None, originally planned to launch by Proton rocket and land with Kazachok. |
| Roscosmos | Two instrument packages for the TGO | None, originally planned to launch by Proton rocket and land with Kazachok. |
| ESA | ExoMars Trace Gas Orbiter | ExoMars's Rosalind Franklin rover and European Lander. |
| ESA | Schiaparelli EDM lander | ExoMars's Rosalind Franklin rover and European Lander. |

=== First launch (2016) ===
==== Trace Gas Orbiter ====
The Trace Gas Orbiter (TGO) is a Mars telecommunications orbiter and atmospheric gas analyzer mission that was launched on 14 March 2016 09:31 UTC. The spacecraft arrived in the Martian orbit in October 2016. It delivered the ExoMars Schiaparelli EDM lander and then proceed to map the sources of methane on Mars and other gases, and in doing so, will help select the landing site for the ExoMars rover to be launched in 2022. The presence of methane in Mars's atmosphere is intriguing because its likely origin is either present-day life or geological activity. Upon the arrival of the rover in 2023, the orbiter would be transferred into a lower orbit where it would be able to perform analytical science activities as well as provide the ExoMars rover with a telecommunication relay. NASA provided an Electra telecommunications relay and navigation instrument to ensure communications between probes and rovers on the surface of Mars and controllers on Earth. The TGO would continue serving as a telecommunication relay satellite for future landed missions until 2022.

==== Schiaparelli EDM lander ====
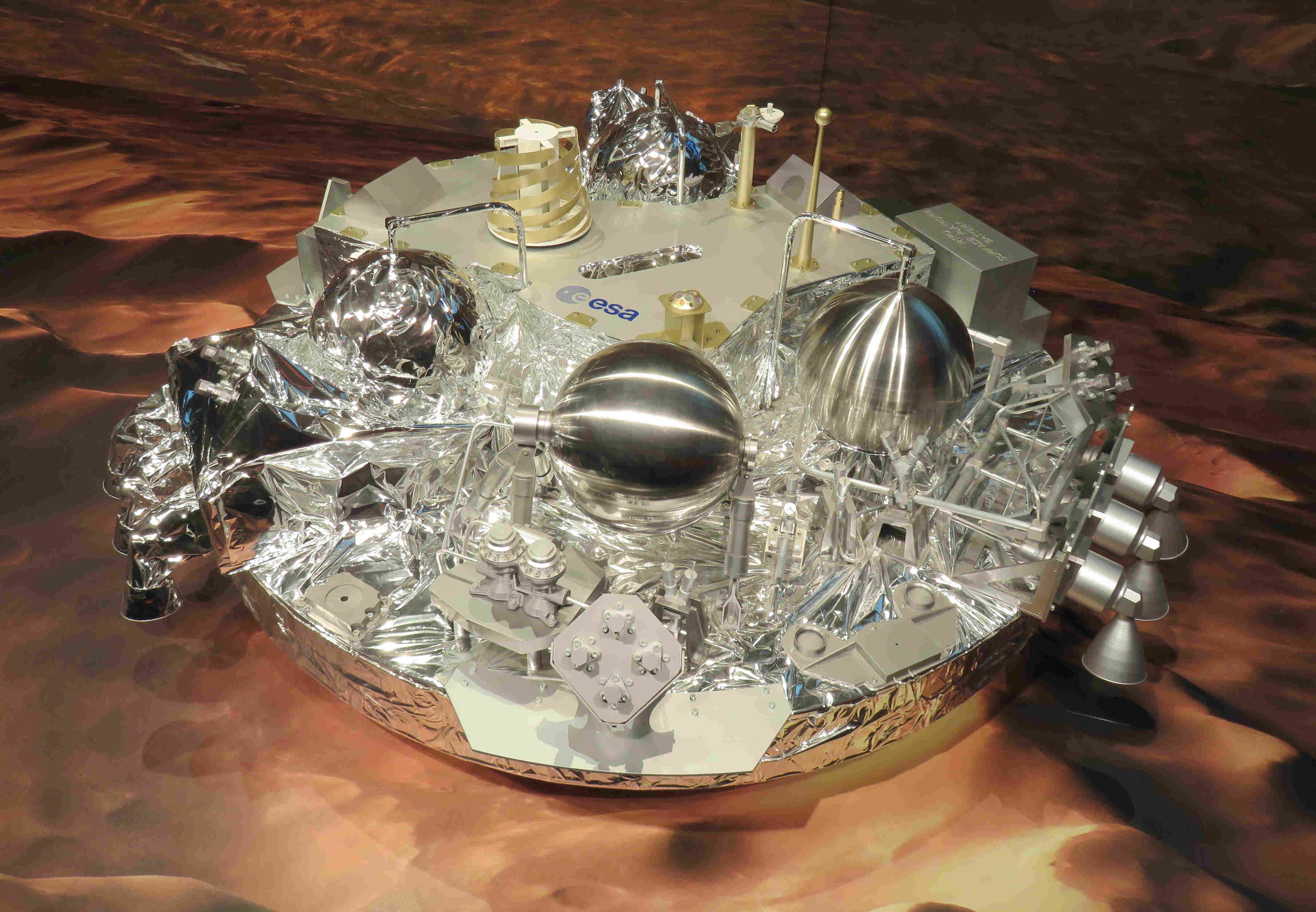
Model of the ExoMars Schiaparelli EDL Demonstrator Module (EDM). During its descent it returned 600 MB of data, but it did not achieve a soft landing.

The Entry, Descent and Landing Demonstrator Module (EDM) called Schiaparelli, was intended to provide the European Space Agency (ESA) and Russia's Roscosmos with the technology for landing on the surface of Mars. It was launched together with the ExoMars Trace Gas Orbiter (TGO) on 14 March 2016, 09:31 UTC and was scheduled to land softly on 19 October 2016. No signal indicating a successful landing was received, and on 21 October 2016, NASA released a Mars Reconnaissance Orbiter image showing what appears to be the lander crash site. The lander was equipped with a non-rechargeable electric battery with enough power for four sols. The soft landing should have taken place on Meridiani Planum during the dust storm season, which would have provided a unique chance to characterise a dust-laden atmosphere during entry and descent, and to conduct surface measurements associated with a dust-rich environment.

Once on the surface, it was to measure the wind speed and direction, humidity, pressure and surface temperature, and determine the transparency of the atmosphere. It carried a surface payload, based on the proposed meteorological DREAMS (Dust Characterisation, Risk Assessment, and Environment Analyser on the Martian Surface) package, consists of a suite of sensors to measure the wind speed and direction (MetWind), humidity (MetHumi), pressure (MetBaro), surface temperature (MarsTem), the transparency of the atmosphere (Optical Depth Sensor; ODS), and atmospheric electrification (Atmospheric Radiation and Electricity Sensor; MicroARES). The DREAMS payload was to function for 2 or 3 days as an environmental station for the duration of the EDM surface mission after landing.

=== Second launch (2028) ===
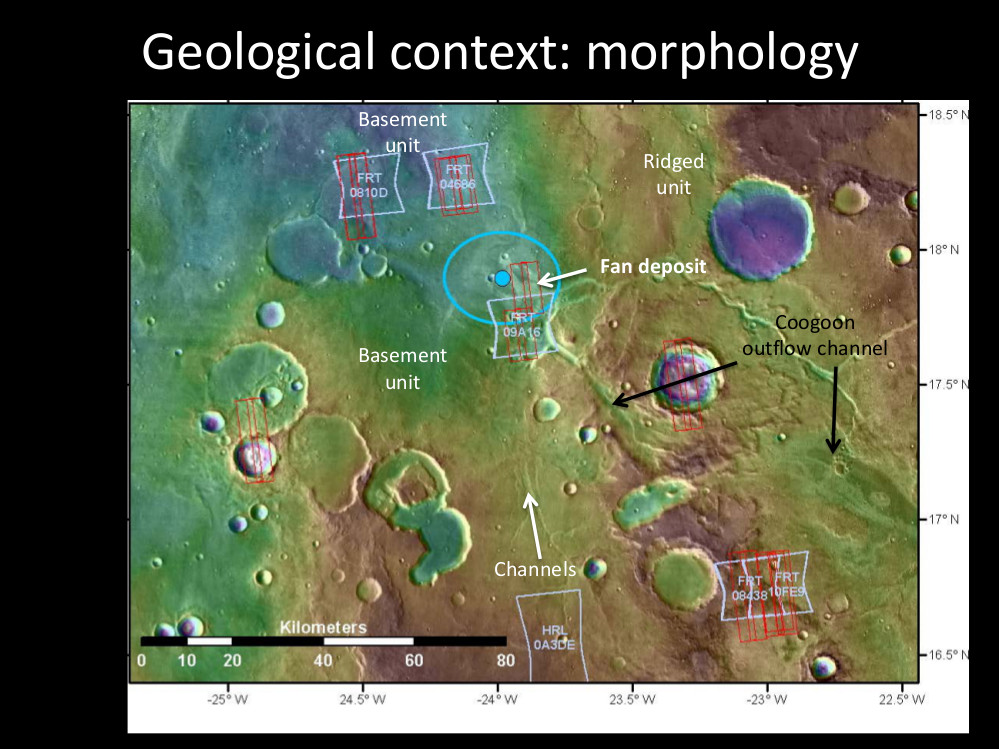
Oxia Planum, near the equator, is the selected landing site for its potential to preserve biosignatures and smooth surface.

The ExoMars 2022 mission was planned for launch during a twelve-day launch window starting on 20 September 2022, and scheduled to land on Mars on 10 June 2023. It would have included a German-built cruise stage and Russian descent module. On 28 February 2022, the ESA announced that, as a result of sanctions related to the Russian invasion of Ukraine, a 2022 launch is "very unlikely." On 28 March 2022, the ExoMars rover was confirmed to be technically ready for launch, but the 2022 launch window for the mission is no longer possible due to the Russian invasion of Ukraine. The launch of a revised version of the mission, using a new non-Russian landing platform, is expected to occur no earlier than 2028. The ESA reported that Rosalind will be launched in 2028 in a US rocket with the rover expected to land in 2030 when the planet will not be experiencing a global dust storm. In 2022, US announced participation and said to provide the lander and 40 Radioisotope Heater Units (RHUs) are also kept reserved for this mission.

==== Rosalind Franklin rover ====
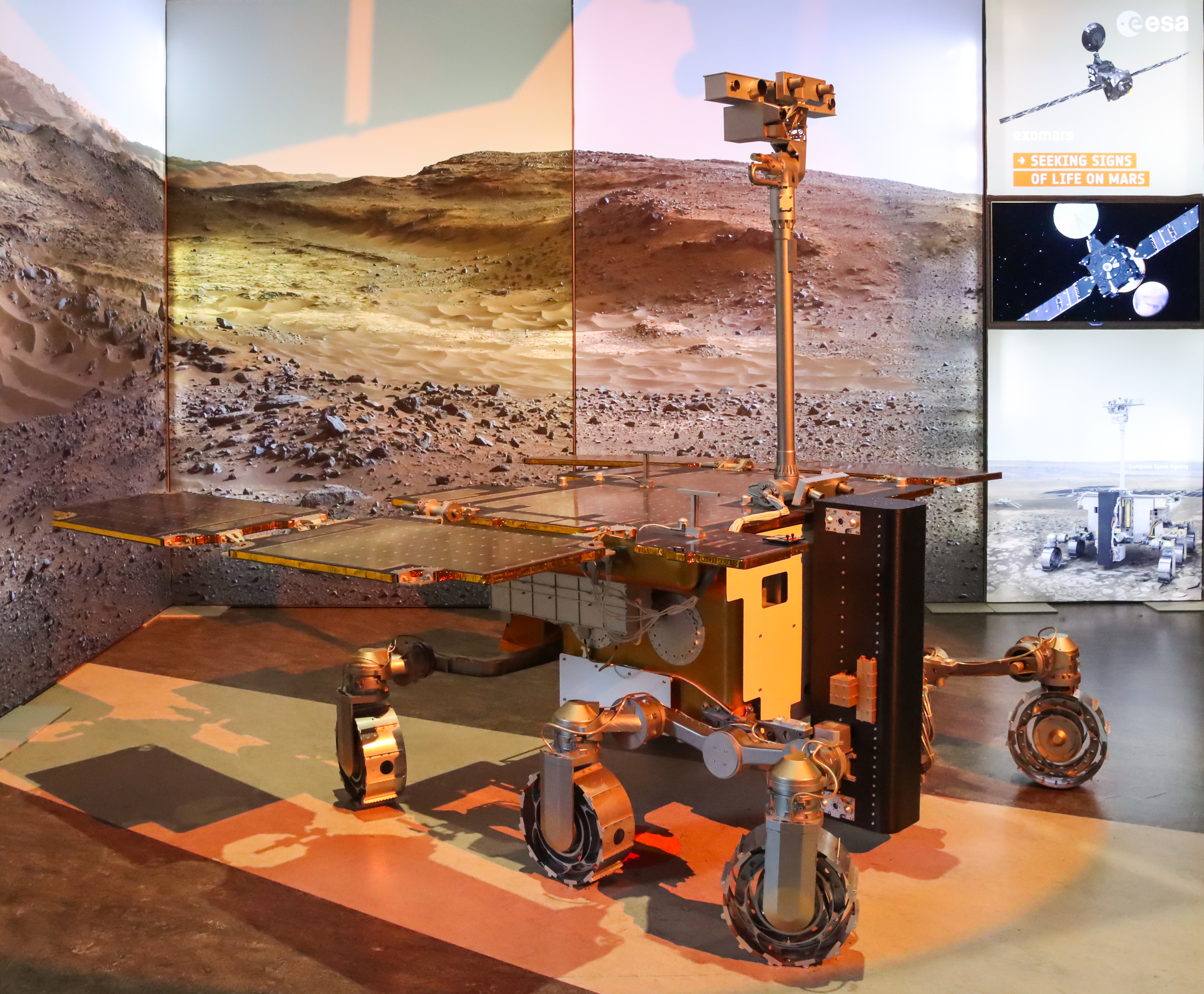
Rosalind Franklin rover model, 2024

ExoMars's Rosalind Franklin rover was due to land in June 2023 and to navigate autonomously across the Martian surface. However, the partnership with Russian scientists was cancelled in 2022 as a response to the Russian invasion of Ukraine that began that year. Rosalind Franklin is now projected to launch in 2028.

Instrumentation would consist of the exobiology laboratory suite, known as "Pasteur analytical laboratory" to look for signs of biomolecules and biosignatures from past life. Among other instruments, the rover will also carry a 2-metre (6.6 ft) sub-surface core drill to pull up samples for its on-board laboratory. They will have a mass of about 207 kg (456 lb).

The Rosalind Franklin rover includes the Pasteur instrument suite, including the Mars Organic Molecule Analyzer (MOMA), MicrOmega-IR, and the Raman Laser Spectrometer (RLS). Examples of external instruments on the rover include:

- Mars Multispectral Imager for Subsurface Studies
- Infrared Spectrometer for ExoMars
- ADRON-RM

== See also ==
- Astrobiology – Science concerned with life in the universe
- Beagle 2 – Failed Mars lander launched in 2003
- Exploration of Mars
- Life on Mars – Assessments of possible life on Mars
- Mars 2020 – Astrobiology Mars rover mission by NASA
- Tianwen-1 – 2020 Interplanetary mission by China to place an orbiter, lander, and rover on Mars
- Mars Exploration Rover – NASA mission to explore Mars via two rovers
- Mars sample-return mission – Mars mission to collect rock and dust samples
- Mars Science Laboratory – Robotic mission that deployed the Curiosity rover to Mars in 2012
- Signs Of LIfe Detector – Spacecraft instrument to detect biosignatures
- Viking lander biological experiments – Mars life detection experiments
