= Almudena Alonso-Herrero =

Spanish astronomer

Almudena Alonso-Herrero (born 1968) is a Spanish astronomer whose research includes the use of infrared astronomy to study star formation and dust emission in Seyfert galaxies and other galaxies with active nuclei. She is a researcher for the Spanish National Research Council, affiliated with the astrophysics department in the Spanish Astrobiology Center of the Instituto Nacional de Técnica Aeroespacial.

== Education and career ==
Alonso-Herrero studied physics and cosmology at the Complutense University of Madrid, earning a licenciate in 1991 and completing her Ph.D. in 1995. She was a postdoctoral researcher at the University of Oxford, University of Arizona, and University of Hertfordshire, and took her present position with the Spanish National Research Council in 2016.

She was part of the instrument teams of NICMOS for the Hubble Space Telescope and MIPS for the Spitzer Space Telescope. She is a Spanish co-investigator of the James Webb MIRI European Consortium. She has served on several international committees, including the ESO Science and Technology Committee and the ESA Astronomy Working Group.

== Recognition ==
Alonso-Herrero is a Fellow of the Royal Astronomical Society, and was elected as a corresponding member of the Spanish Royal Academy of Sciences in 2022.

== Selected publications ==
=== Popularization ===
- Alonso Herrero, Almudena (2022), Descubriendo Galaxias (in Spanish), Illustrated by Jesús Romero Márquez, Next Door Publishers, ISBN 978-84-125659-7-3

=== Research papers ===
- Alonso-Herrero, Almudena; Rieke, George H.; Rieke, Marcia J.; Scoville, Nick Z. (April 2000), "Extreme star formation in the interacting galaxy Arp 299 (IC 694 + NGC 3690)", The Astrophysical Journal, 532 (2): 845–866, arXiv:astro-ph/9911534, Bibcode:2000ApJ...532..845A, doi:10.1086/308622, S2CID 118248935
- Alonso-Herrero, A.; Perez-Gonzalez, P. G.; Alexander, D. M.; Rieke, G. H.; Rigopoulou, D.; Floc'h, E. Le; Barmby, P.; Papovich, C.; Rigby, J. R.; Bauer, F. E.; Brandt, W. N.; Egami, E.; Willner, S. P.; Dole, H.; Huang, J.-S. (March 2006), "Infrared power-law galaxies in the Chandra deep field–south: active galactic nuclei and ultraluminous infrared galaxies", The Astrophysical Journal, 640 (1): 167–184, arXiv:astro-ph/0511507, Bibcode:2006ApJ...640..167A, doi:10.1086/499800, S2CID 119879418
- Alonso-Herrero, Almudena; Rieke, George H.; Rieke, Marcia J.; Colina, Luis; Perez-Gonzalez, Pablo G.; Ryder, Stuart D. (October 2006), "Near-infrared and star-forming properties of local luminous infrared galaxies", The Astrophysical Journal, 650 (2): 835–849, arXiv:astro-ph/0606186, Bibcode:2006ApJ...650..835A, doi:10.1086/506958, S2CID 9157324
- Alonso-Herrero, Almudena; Almeida, Cristina Ramos; Mason, Rachel; Ramos, Andrés Asensio; Roche, Patrick F.; Levenson, Nancy A.; Elitzur, Moshe; Packham, Christopher; Espinosa, José Miguel Rodríguez; Young, Stuart; Díaz-Santos, Tanio; Pérez-García, Ana M. (July 2011), "Torus and active galactic nucleus properties of nearby Seyfert galaxies: results from fitting infrared spectral energy distributions and spectroscopy", The Astrophysical Journal, 736 (2), American Astronomical Society: 82, arXiv:1105.2368, Bibcode:2011ApJ...736...82A, doi:10.1088/0004-637x/736/2/82, S2CID 55760881
