= Raman Laser Spectrometer =

Indonesia

- Operator: European Space Agency
- Manufacturer: Spanish Astrobiology Center (CSIC-INTA)
- Instrument type: Raman spectrometer
- Function: mineralogical composition
- Mission duration: ≥ 7 months
- Website: ExoMars Rover Instrument Suite

Host spacecraft
- Spacecraft: Rosalind Franklin rover
- Operator: European Space Agency
- Launch date: NET 2028

Raman Laser Spectrometer (RLS) is a miniature Raman spectrometer that is part of the science payload on board the European Space Agency's Rosalind Franklin rover, tasked to search for biosignatures and biomarkers on Mars. The rover is planned to be launched not earlier than 2028 and land on Mars in 2029.

Raman spectroscopy is a technique employed to identify mineral phases produced by water-related processes. RLS will help to identify organic compounds and search for microbial life by identifying the mineral products and indicators of biologic activities. RLS will provide geological and mineralogical context information that will be scientifically cross-correlated with that obtained by other instruments.

== Overview ==
RLS	Parameter/units
Type	Raman spectrometer
Mass	2.4 kg
Power consumption	20W to 30 W
Laser wavelength	532 nm
Irradiance on sample	0.4 - 8 kW/cm^{2}
Spectral range	150-3800/cm^{−1}
Spectral resolution	6 to 8/cm
Spot size	50 μm

Raman spectroscopy is sensitive to the composition and structure of any organic compound, making it a powerful tool for the definitive identification and characterisation of biomarkers, and providing direct information of potential biosignatures of past microbial life on Mars. This instrument will also provide general mineralogical information for igneous, metamorphous, and sedimentary processes.

RST will also correlate its spectral information with other spectroscopic and imaging instruments such as the Infrared Spectrometer and MicrOmega-IR. This will be the first Raman analyser to be deployed for a planetary exploration. The first version for the rover was presented by Fernando Rull-Perez and Sylvestre Maurice in 2003. The RLS is being developed by a European consortium integrated by Spanish, French, German and UK partners. The Principal Investigator is Fernando Rull-Perez, from Spanish Astrobiology Center. The co-investigator is from Observatoire Midi-Pyrénées (LAOMP), France.

The three major components are the Spectrometer Unit, the Control and Excitation Unit (includes the power converters), and Optical head.

== Principle and operation ==
The RLS instrument provides a structural fingerprint by which molecules can be identified. It is used to analyse the vibrational modes of a substance either in the solid, liquid or gas state. The technique relies on Raman scattering of a photon by molecules which are excited to higher vibrational or rotational energy levels. In more detail, it will collect and analyse the scattered light emitted by a laser on a crushed Mars rock sample; the spectrum observed (number of peaks, position and relative intensities) is determined by the molecular structure and composition of a compound, enabling the identification and characterisation of the compounds in the sample.

Some advantages of RLS over other analysers are that it is nondestructive, analysis is completed in a fraction of a second, and the spectral bands provide definitive composition of the material. RLS measurements will be conducted on the resulting crushed sample powder and it will be a useful tool for flagging the presence of organic molecules for further biomarker search by the MOMA analyser.

The processor board carries out several key functions for the Raman spectrometer control, spectral operation, data storage, and communications with the rover. The complete instrument has a mass of 2.4 kg (5.29 lb) and consumes about 30 W while operating.

== Objectives ==
The goal of RLS is to seek signs of past life on Mars (biosignatures and biomarkers) by analysing drilled samples acquired from 2 meters below the Martian surface by the Rosalind Franklin rover core drill. The science objectives of RLS are:

1. Identify organic compounds and search for life.
2. Identify mineral products and indicators of biologic activity.
3. Characterize mineral phases produced by water-related processes.
4. Characterize igneous minerals and their alteration products.
5. Characterize the water/geochemical environment as a function of depth in the shallow subsurface.

== See also ==
- Astrobiology
- Life on Mars
