= Cleaning event =

Mars exploration rover phenomenon

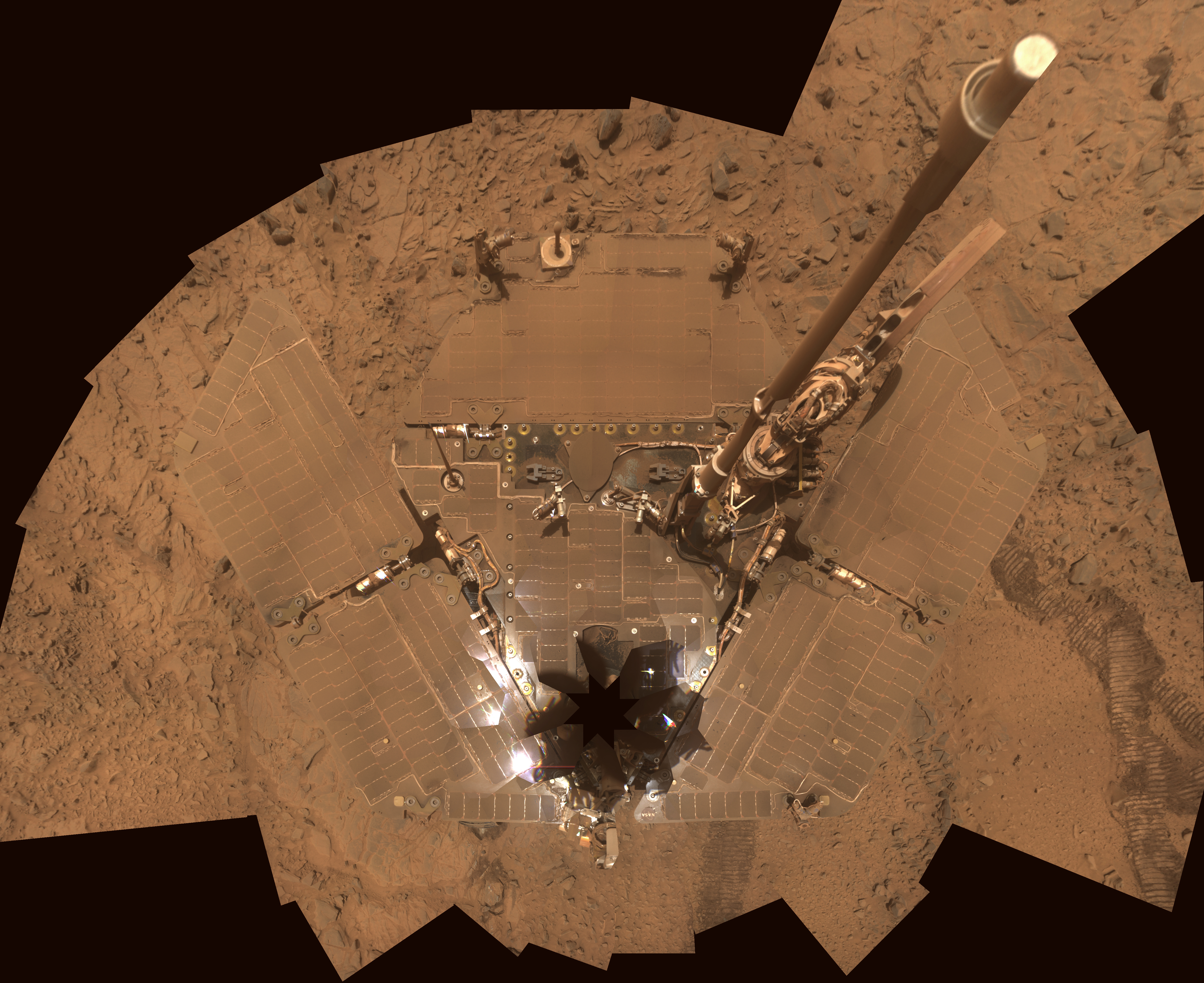
Circular projection showing MER-A Spirit's solar panels covered in dust in October 2007 on Mars. Cleaning events have periodically increased power from the solar arrays.

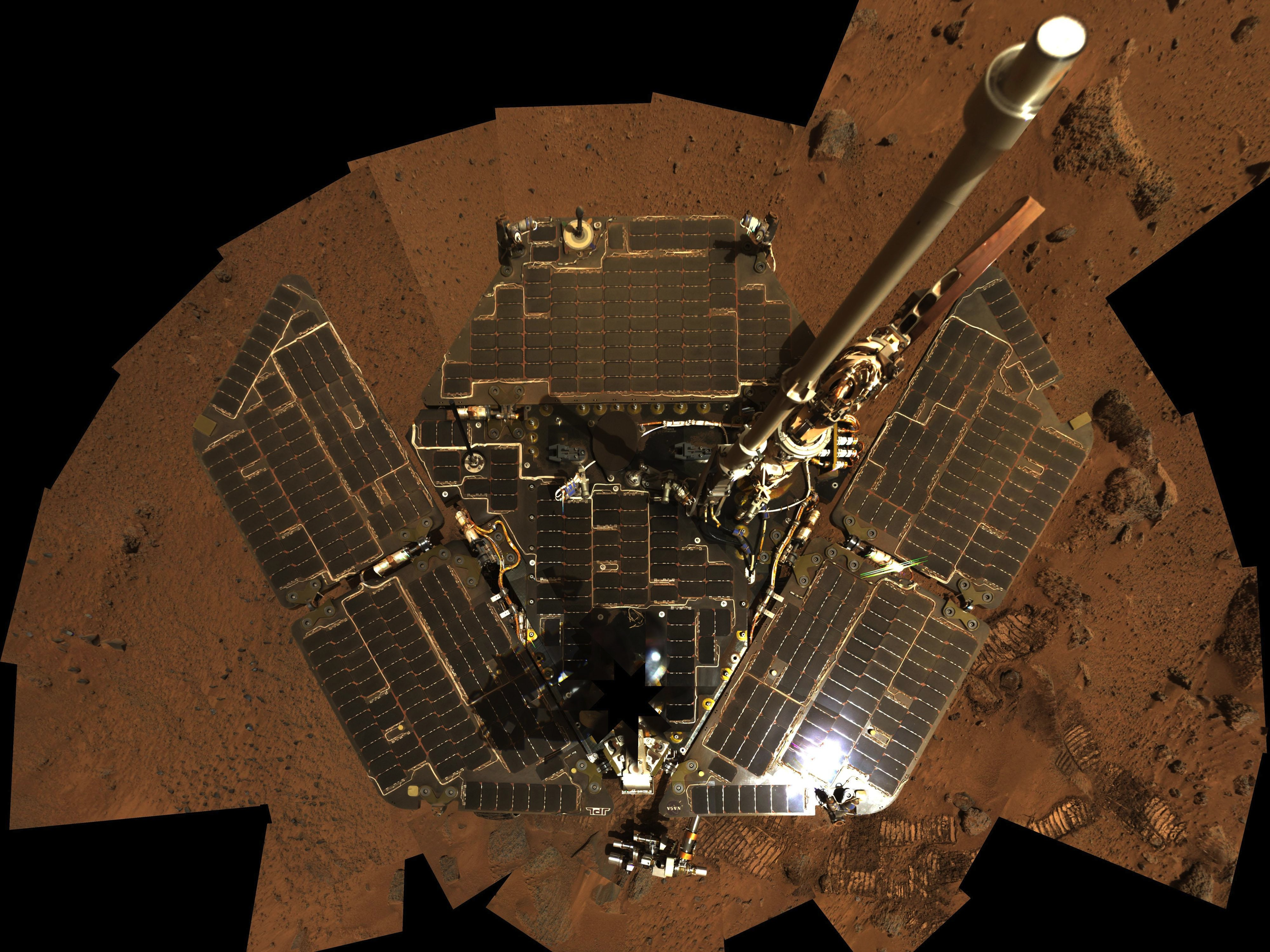
Overhead shot of Spirit without accumulated dust (November 2008)

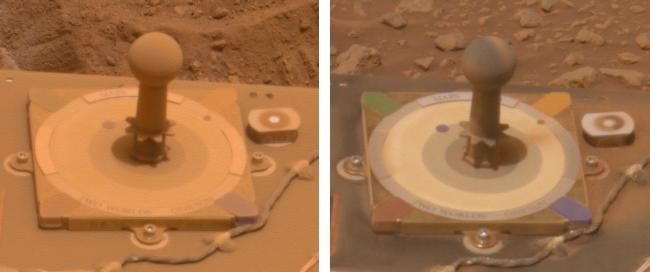
Spirit's sundial before and after a cleaning event

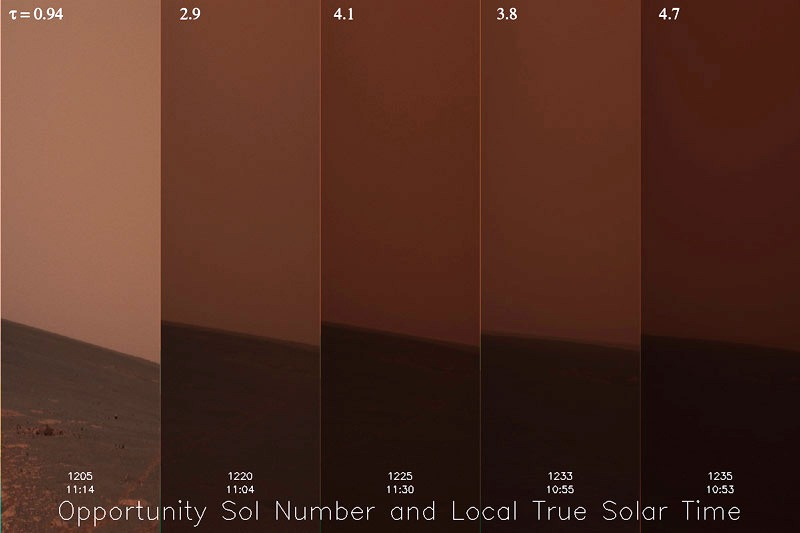
Time-lapse composite of the Martian horizon during Sols 1205 (0.94), 1220 (2.9), 1225 (4.1), 1233 (3.8), 1235 (4.7) shows how much sunlight the dust storms blocked; Tau of 4.7 indicates 99% blocked.

A cleaning event is a phenomenon whereby dust is removed from solar panels, in the context of exploration and science rovers on Mars, supposedly by the action of wind. The term is used on several NASA webpages; generally supposing that Martian winds have blown dust clear off the probes on Mars, including the solar panels which power them, increasing their energy output. The nature of the cleaning events is not known, but the assumption is that wind blows the dust off the panels. Cleaning events were discovered in 2004 when, several times, power levels increased by 5% overnight, in contrast to the expectation they would decrease—the added power allowed the missions to continue beyond their expected lifetime. One theory is that wind currents in craters aid in cleaning events, and also if the rover is sloped, this is speculated to help remove dust.

The term started being used in 2004 as the Mars Exploration Rovers' (MER) solar panels started to benefit from these events. The rovers were expected to last about 90 sols (Martian days) on Mars, after which dust would cover their solar panels and reduce solar power to levels too low for the rovers to operate. However, power levels went back up due to the cleaning events caused by the winds in the Martian atmosphere. Periodic cleaning events have allowed the MERs to operate far longer than the planned 3 months. The Spirit rover finally ceased operation in early 2010, and the Opportunity rover remained active until mid 2018, more than 14 years after landing.

Cleaning events can either be rapid, such as overnight, or over many days where solar power slowly goes up. For example, with the MER-A Spirit rover, on 18 and 28 April 2009, the power output of the solar arrays was increased by cleaning events. The power output of Spirit's solar arrays increased from 223 watt-hours per day on 31 March 2009 to 372 watt-hours per day on 29 April 2009. Spirit had experienced multiple cleaning events during its operation that aided in its mission extension. However, the lack of cleaning events was noted as a factor in its demise.

Other factors that affect solar power output include the opacity of the Martian atmosphere and Martian seasonal changes; however, this does not account for the directly observable removal of dust from the upper surfaces of the rovers as shown in the images.

The Materials Adherence Experiment had a glass plate that allowed the dust to be cleared off; the device protected a Gallium arsenide photo-cell. It was part of the Mars Pathfinder program in the 1990s. This allowed the rate at which dust accumulated to be measured.

== Noted cleaning events ==
- In early 2014 cleaning events boosted power levels on the Opportunity (MER-B) rover by 70%. A particularly strong cleaning event occurred in March 2014 while the rover was at Endeavour crater.

== See also ==
- Curiosity rover
- Exploration of Mars
- MER Mars Exploration Rover mission
- MER-A Spirit rover
- MER-B Opportunity rover
