= Materials Adherence Experiment =

1997 science experiment conducted on Mars

The MAE integration module. The MAE was mounted to the left-front top corner of the Mars Pathfinder Sojourner rover.

The Materials Adherence Experiment (MAE) was a material science experiment conducted between July 4, 1997, and August 12, 1997, during NASA's Mars Pathfinder mission. This was a joint experiment between NASA and the Jet Propulsion Laboratory at the California Institute of Technology that consisted of a small module mounted to Pathfinder's rover Sojourner that examined the effects of Martian surface dust on solar cells.

== Purpose ==
Using solar power on the Martian surface is challenging because the Martian atmosphere has a significant amount of dust suspended in it. In addition to blocking sunlight from reaching Mars's surface, dust particles gradually settle out of the air and onto objects. As Pathfinder was NASA's first Mars surface mission to be solar-powered, the effect of Martian dust settling on solar cells was not well understood before the mission. It was predicted at the time that dust particles in the Martian atmosphere would settle on the solar cells powering Pathfinder, blocking sunlight from striking them and slowly causing Pathfinder to lose power. Since knowing how the settling of dust out of Mars's atmosphere would affect solar cell performance would be critical to subsequent solar-powered missions on Mars, the MAE was included aboard the Sojourner rover to measure the degradation in performance of a solar cell as dust settled.

== Design ==
The MAE, which was located on the front left corner of the solar array, consisted of a small gallium-arsenide solar cell mounted underneath a removable glass cover plate. As the mission progressed, atmospheric dust would settle on the glass cover plate, blocking increasingly more sunlight from striking the solar cell, causing it to produce less power. Throughout the mission, the glass cover plate was occasionally rotated away from the solar cell, removing the light-blocking effects of the dust. Sensors measuring the difference in power output of the solar cell before and after the cover plate was removed indicated how quickly the solar cell was losing its ability to produce power, and by extension, how quickly dust was collecting on the cover plate.

The rotating actuator used to move the glass cover plate away from the solar cell marked the first use of a multi-cycle shape memory alloy in a space application.

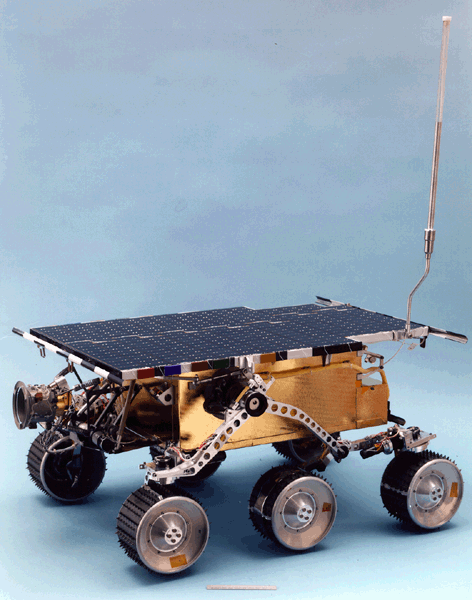
Sideview of the Sojourner rover

Due to the high level of UV radiation on the surface of Mars, it was important that the glass that covered the solar cell would not darken. For this purpose Suprasil was chosen.

== Results ==
The MAE recorded a 2% obscuration due to dust on its first day of operation, probably caused by dust kicked up locally by Pathfinder's airbag being retracted. Measurements taken by the MAE at local noon for the first 24 days of Pathfinder's operation on Mars showed that atmospheric dust obscured the test solar cell at a rate of 0.28% per day. This degradation rate was about the same regardless of whether Sojourner was moving or stationary. Measurements taken at local 2pm showed a slightly higher obscuration rate over the first 20 days of the mission, at 0.33% per day. These findings were consistent with the decline in power output of the solar cells on Sojourner and the Pathfinder lander, which indicated a dust accumulation rate of 0.29% per day, and fairly close to the value predicted before Pathfinder landed (0.22% per day).

== See also ==
- Exploration of Mars
- Martian soil
- Mars Environmental Dynamics Analyzer (planned atmospheric and dust experiment for the Mars 2020 rover)
- Cleaning event
