= Mars Exploration Joint Initiative =

International space agencies agreement about Mars exploration

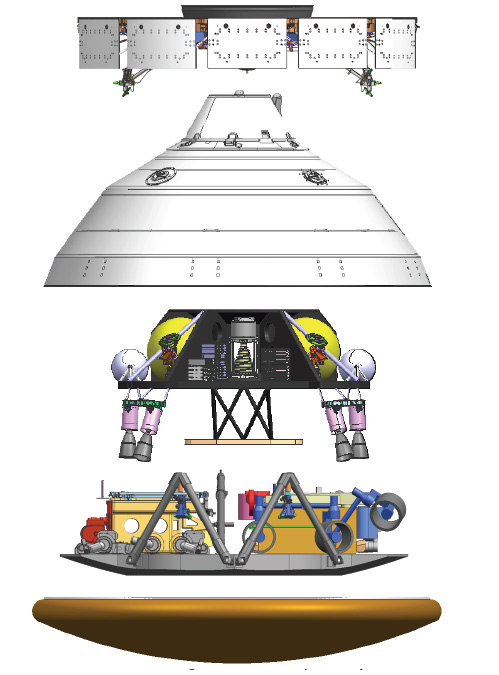
Collobrative design at point called for two rovers being delivered at once that would explore Mars together. In 2010 there was the idea to these into one larger 600 kg rover.

The Mars Exploration Joint Initiative (MEJI) is an agreement signed between United States' space agency, NASA, and Europe's space agency, ESA to join resources and expertise in order to continue the exploration of the planet Mars. The agreement was signed in Washington D.C. in October 2009, between NASA administrator Charles Bolden and ESA director-general Jean-Jacques Dordain.

In its hey-day it resulted in a synergy between NASA Mars Science Orbiter and the Aurora ExoMars program, the combination of a flexible collaborative proposal within NASA and ESA to send a new orbiter-carrier to Mars in 2016 as part of the European-led ExoMars project. One of the goals was for NASA to provide to Atlas V launches for ExoMars, however in the early 2010s planetary exploration in the USA was not given enough money to fund this plan.

Under the FY2013 budget President Barack Obama released on 13 February 2012, NASA terminated its participation in ExoMars due to budgetary cuts in order to pay for the cost overruns of the James Webb Space Telescope. With NASA's funding for this project cancelled, most of ExoMars's plans had to be restructured.

== History ==
Discussions between NASA and ESA began in December 2008, driven by the ESA Ministerial Council's recommendation to seek international cooperation to complete the ExoMars mission and to prepare further Mars robotic exploration missions. At the same time, NASA was reassessing its Mars Exploration Program portfolio after the launch of its Mars Science Laboratory was delayed from 2009 to 2011. This provided NASA and ESA with an opportunity to increase cooperation and expand collective capabilities. The U.S. and Europe have taken the view that they can achieve more together scientifically at Mars if they combine their expertise. And with both parties' current Mars programmes also experiencing financial pressures, the shared approach means the exploration schedule of a mission every two years can be maintained.

The executive board recommended that NASA and ESA establish MEJI, spanning launch opportunities in 2016, 2018 and 2020, with landers and orbiters conducting astrobiological, geological, geophysical and other high-priority investigations, and leading to the return of soil and rock samples from Mars in the 2020s.

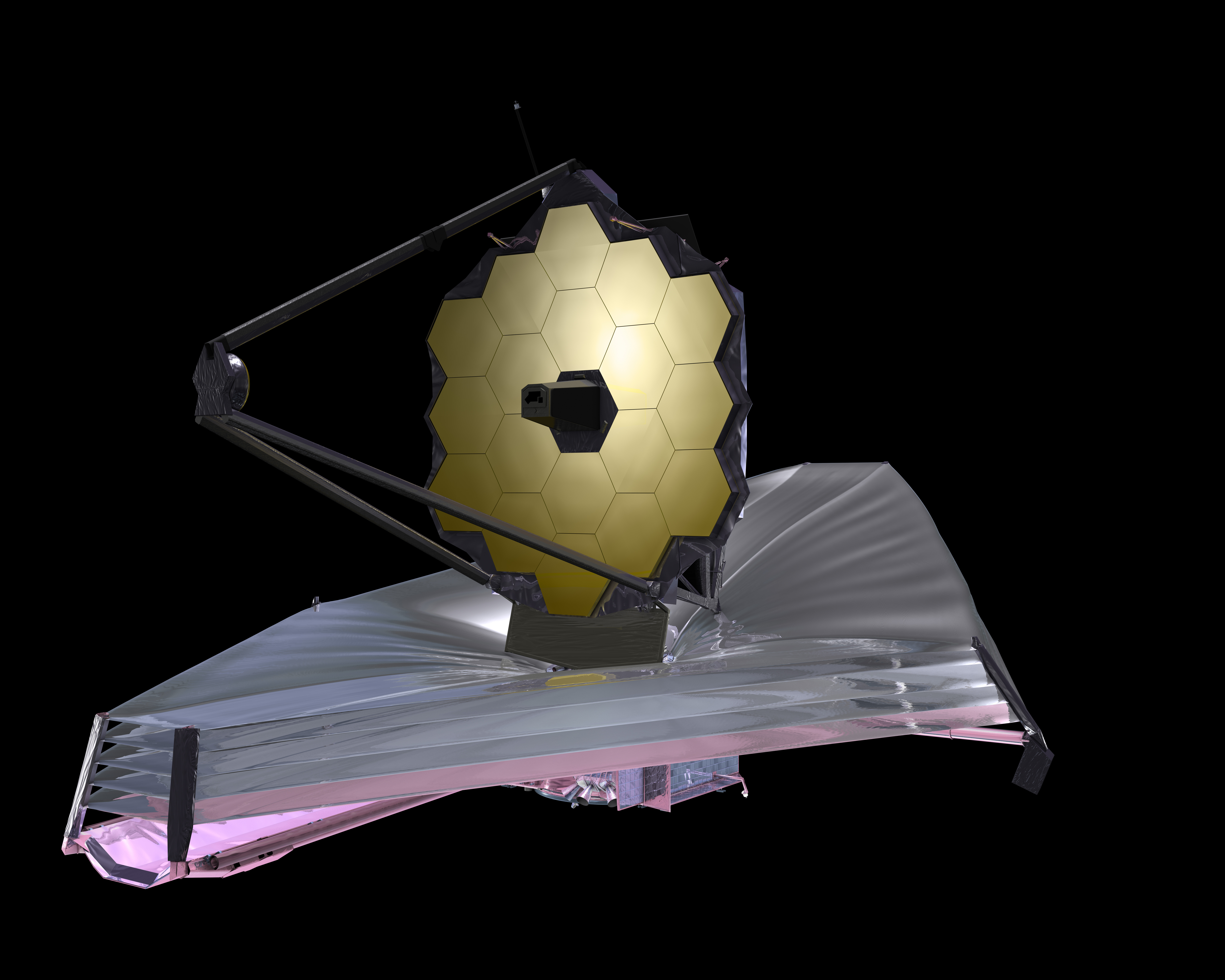
JWST survive a 2011 cancellation attempt, but is predicted to cost US$8.8 billion.

Under the FY2013 Budget President Obama released on February 13, 2012, NASA was forced to pull out of joint Mars missions with Europe due to budgetary cuts, in order to pay for the cost overruns of the James Webb Space Telescope. The proposal for the Financial Year 2013 reduced the planetary science budget from $1.5bn to $1.2bn; Although planetary science was a loser in general, Mars exploration was singled out for particular cuts, receiving $360.8m, which amounts to a reduction of almost 40% from the FY2012 estimate. The cuts may plunge the field into its biggest crisis since the 1980s and is considered likely to lead to the loss of up to 2,000 high-tech jobs.

On February 29, 2012, the U.S. House Appropriations subcommittee that oversees NASA funding, rejected the space agency's request to begin shutting down its joint Mars-exploration effort with the European Space Agency, until the issue can be debated thoroughly. The committee believes that "so radical a change in policy needs and deserves to be fully considered by a process that is more rigorous and more inclusive than the reprogramming notification."

Regardless of the final outcome by the House Appropriations subcommittee, NASA will continue with its own Mars exploration projects: Mars Science Laboratory, MAVEN orbiter, Mars 2020 rover, and InSight lander.

=== Current status ===
In April 2018, a letter of intent was signed by NASA and ESA that may provide a basis for a Mars sample-return mission. It is unclear if this is a new initiative or a restart of the original Mars Exploration Joint Initiative.

The two agencies would need to draw up the mission architecture, and would be seeking commercial partners to collaborate on any sample-return mission.

== Missions ==
In its original version, the MEJI vision would have encompassed the following launch opportunities:

- 2016: A European-led orbiter (ExoMars Trace Gas Orbiter), to study trace gases, including methane in Mars's atmosphere. The mission would also put a static meteorological station on the surface. Europe would handle the entry, descent and landing of this station - a capability it has yet to demonstrate.
- 2018: A European rover (ExoMars rover) would be dispatched to Mars. The U.S. would provide the entry, descent and landing system as being used by the Mars Science Laboratory.
- 2020: Under consideration is a network of very small landers focused on geophysics and the environment.
- NASA would provide Atlas V launch rockets in 2016 and 2018 ExoMars missions.
- The ultimate aim is a mission to return Mars rock and soils to Earth: the Mars sample return mission, some time in the 2020s.
