= Mars Astrobiology Explorer-Cacher =

Cancelled NASA Mars rover concept

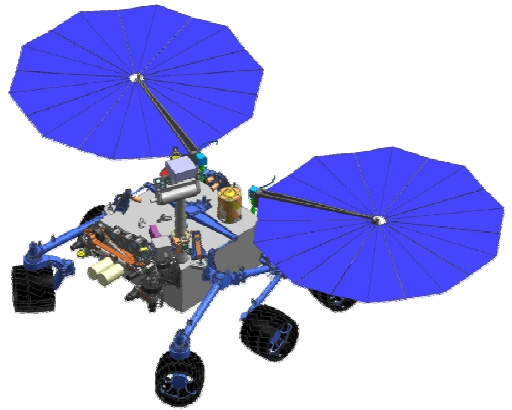
- Mission type: Rover
- Operator: NASA
- Mission duration: One Earth year (proposed)

Spacecraft properties
- Launch mass: 300 kg (660 lb)

Start of mission
- Rocket: Atlas V

The Mars Astrobiology Explorer-Cacher (MAX-C), also known as Mars 2018 mission, was a NASA concept for a Mars rover mission, proposed to be launched in 2018 together with the European ExoMars rover. The MAX-C rover concept was cancelled in April 2011 due to budget cuts.

The rover would have been solar powered, with a maximum mass of 300 kg and based largely on the Curiosity rover components, but would have entailed a system tailored to the specific payload. The MAX-C rover would have performed an in-situ astrobiological exploration, evaluate the habitability potential of various Martian environments, and it would have collected, documented, and cached samples for potential return to Earth by a future mission.

The Mars 2020 mission with its Perseverance rover had similar scientific objectives as Mars 2018 and MAX-C.

== History ==
The essential energy, water, and nutrient requirements to support and sustain life on Mars are currently present, and the Martian geologic record offers tantalizing clue of many ancient habitable environments. If life emerged and evolved on early Mars then it is possible, and indeed likely, that physical or chemical biosignatures are preserved in the exposed rock record. These discoveries and inferences make a compelling case for a rover mission designed to explore for evidence of past Martian life.

For over a decade, the Mars Exploration Program has pursued a strategy of "follow the water". While this strategy has been highly successful in the Mars missions of 1996-2007, it is increasingly appreciated that assessing the full astrobiological potential of Martian environments requires going beyond the identification of locations where liquid water was present. Thus, in order to seek signs of past or present life on Mars, it is necessary to characterize more comprehensively the macroscopic and microscopic fabric of sedimentary materials. This type of information would be critical to select and cache of relevant samples for addressing the life question in samples intended for study in sophisticated laboratories on Earth.

The possible strategy of using rovers to collect and cache geological samples for possible subsequent return to Earth has been discussed as far back as at least the mid-1990s. In 2007 it was recommended sample caching on all surface missions that follow the Mars Science Laboratory Curiosity rover, in a way that would prepare for a relatively early return of samples to Earth. In mid-2007, NASA directed that a very simple cache be added to the Curiosity rover and, although they endorsed the potential value of sample caching, experts raised serious concerns regarding sample quality for this specific implementation. In November 2008, the cache was descoped to make room for tools to clean the rover's sample acquisition equipment, which were added due to sample handling problems encountered by the Phoenix lander.

A mid-range rover concept was originally included in the planning work of the Mars Architecture Tiger Team (MATT). By the time of the MATT-3 report in 2009, the potential mission was referred to with several different working names, including both 'Mid-Range Rover' and 'Mars Prospector Rover', and the mission concept was generically envisioned as including a single Mars Exploration Rover or Mars Science Laboratory-class rover with precision landing and sampling/caching capability. To provide a name that fit the mission concept better, it was changed in August 2009 from the generic Mid-Range Rover (MRR) to Mars Astrobiology Explorer-Cacher (MAX-C).

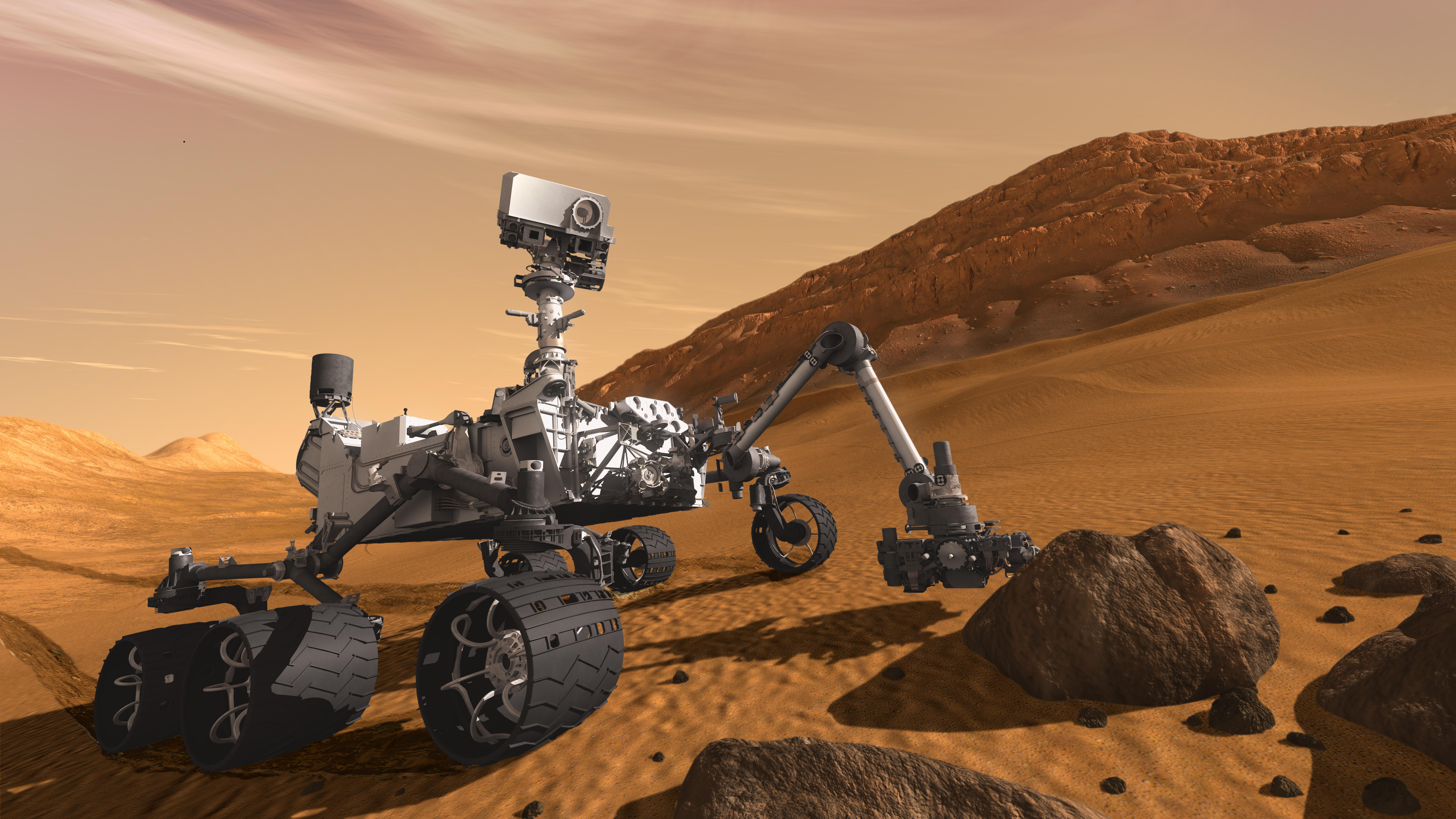
Both MAX-C and the Mars 2020 Perseverance rover were envisioned to use features developed for the Curiosity rover

In April 2011, because of a budgeting crisis, a proposal was announced to fly only one rover in 2018 that would be larger than either of the vehicles in the paired concept, ExoMars (ESA) and MAX-C (NASA). One suggestion was that the new vehicle be built in Europe and take on a combination of European and USA instruments. NASA proposed to provide a launch rocket and the "Sky Crane" landing system. In February 2012, NASA terminated its participation in ExoMars due to budgetary cuts, and when Congress reinstated funding for Mars exploration after a loud outcry from planetary scientists and enthusiasts, NASA announced in December 2012 the Mars 2020 rover and, later, that it would indeed prepare a sample cache.

== Objectives ==
The main objective was at a site with high preservation potential for physical and chemical biosignatures, evaluate paleo-environmental conditions, characterize the potential for preservation of biosignatures, and access multiple sequences of geological units in a search for evidence of past life and/or prebiotic chemistry. Samples necessary to achieve the scientific objectives of the proposed future sample return mission would be collected, documented, and packaged in a manner suitable for potential return to Earth.

The primary science objective was to land at a site interpreted to represent high habitability potential, and with high preservation potential for physical and chemical biosignatures:

- Early Noachian astrobiology — Prebiotic environmental context in which life potentially arose.
- Noachian-Hesperian stratigraphy — Whether surface conditions before and after the decline in erosion, aqueous weathering, fluvial activity, and magnetic field were habitable.
- Astrobiology — Test life-related hypotheses in the context of another specific kind of geologic terrain. Sample collection that could have preserved evidence of prebiotic chemistry or life on Mars; characterize the potential for the preservation of biosignatures.
- Methane emission from subsurface.
- Radiometric dating
- Deep core drill — core samples from a depth of ~ 2m
- Polar layered deposits — Investigate potential record of recent global climate changes.
- Mid-latitude shallow ice — Investigate the habitability of mid-latitude ice, and how does perchlorate affect the present habitability of Mars. Could mid-latitude ice provide a resource for In-Situ Resource Utilization (ISRU)?

A secondary science objective would have been to address the need for long-term atmospheric pressure data from the Martian surface. There were studies evaluating the possibilities for cooperative science between the MAX-C rover and the ExoMars rover if landed together at the same location.

== Landing ==
The proposed MAX-C mission would have arrived at Mars in January 2019 in the northern hemisphere during winter, given the favorable atmospheric pressure at this season and performance of the 'sky crane' delivery system. Due to the eccentricity of the Martian orbit, latitude access for a solar powered rover, northern latitudes are less severe on the power/thermal design than southern latitudes, allowing effective operation at sites as far north as 25°N and as far south as 15°S.

Given that scientifically interesting features often represent terrain that is too dangerous to land on, the landing ellipse is often driven to be placed right up against but not on top of features of interest. The result is that access is often a product of both ellipse size and rover traverse capability sufficient to get outside the ellipse in a reasonable amount of time relative to the mission lifetime. The entry, descent and landing system would have been of high precision with a targeting accuracy of 7 km (4.3 mi). The solar-powered rover would have needed to have a range of no less than 10 km (6.2 mi) and a lifetime of at least one Earth year.

== Rover ==
The MAX-C rover would have relied on significant inheritance of MSL's Curiosity rover design, flight design, test design, test and handling hardware to minimize cost and risk. This solar-powered rover required a range of no less than 20 km (12 mi) and a lifetime of at least 500 Martian days (sols). Since many of the geologically interesting terrains on Mars expose stratified layers on slopes in craters, channels, and hillsides, it would be extremely useful for the proposed MAX-C mission to be capable to navigate on slopes of up to 30 degrees, as both of the Spirit and Opportunity MERs have done.

The mass would have been about 300 kg, bigger than the MERs, comparable in mass to the ExoMars rover, but lighter than the Curiosity rover.

== Proposed science instrumentation ==
The rover would have carried instrumentation sufficient to scientifically select samples for caching. It was assumed that this translates to the following instruments and capabilities:

- Must be able to remotely (i.e. with mast-mounted instruments) characterize outcrops and identify features of interest (panoramic camera, Near-IR Spectrometer)
- Must be able to collect microscaleimagery of outcrops; contact instrument (microscopic imager)
- Must be able to expose unweathered rock surfaces using a surface abrasion tool (abrading bits)
- Must be able to measure mineralogy at micro-scales on the abraded rock surfaces; contact instrument (Raman spectroscopy)
- Must be able to measure bulk elemental chemistry on the abraded rock surfaces; contact instrument (Alpha particle X-ray spectrometer)
- Must be able to measure organic compounds on the abraded rock surfaces; contact instrument (Raman spectroscopy)
- Must be able to correlate composition to micro-scale structures and textures in the rocks (microscopic imager)

== Sample cache ==
Returning samples from Mars is essential to meeting the Mars Exploration Program's highest priority scientific objectives. However, a Mars sample return mission entails high cost and risk, and it entails scientific sample selection, acquisition, and documentation for potential return to Earth, so it must also deliver unprecedented value. Even though any sample returned from Mars would be useful for some line of scientific inquiry, it is also true that not all samples would be equally useful for detailed scientific investigation. To address the highest priority scientific questions, selection of "outstanding samples" would be required. Samples necessary to achieve the scientific objectives of the proposed future sample return mission would be collected, documented, and packaged in a manner suitable for potential return to Earth. A future surface rendezvous would recover the cache and load it into the 'Mars Ascent Vehicle' for its delivery to Earth.

If, at the MSL Curiosity rover landing site (2012), scientists do not recognize an outstanding sample, they will want to send a rover to an alternate site selected from orbital data and for which an argument could be made that there is better science or access potential; if MSL does discover outstanding samples, scientists would presumably want to send a rover back to collect them for return, therefore, having the MAX-C developed for a 2018 launch could have saved time and resources. The proposed sampling requirement would be to collect 20 samples at four sites outside the landing ellipse within one Earth year. The rover would then drive to a safe location to deposit the 20-sample cache for a fetch rover to potentially retrieve sometime after 2020. For such a scenario, the MAX-C rover would be expected to traverse 10 km in 150 driving sols, i.e., ~67 m/sol on average, so an improved rover autonomy would be needed for the candidate MAX-C mission.

The MAX-C rover would have been able to acquire samples through coring and abrasion. Coring was to be accomplished through the use of a core drill that could produce cores of approximately 10 mm diameter up to 50 mm long, which would be encapsulated in individual sleeves with pressed-in caps. Abrading of surface material would be accomplished through the use of a specialized abrading bit placed in the coring tool. This tool would be intended to remove small amounts of surface material in order to allow instruments access past any dust and/or weathering layer. It would abrade a circular area of similar diameter to the core (8–10 mm). Translation of the arm would be used to scan the individual abrasion spots. The rover should be able to cache at least 38 core samples.

== Technology development ==
A cost of $70M was estimated to fund the technology development activities; the mission concept would require technology development in four key areas:

- Coring, encapsulation, and caching: Lightweight tools/mechanisms for obtaining and handling cored samples.
- Instruments: Additional technology focus to mature instruments that could address the measurement needs posed herein, particularly the micro-scale mineralogy, organics, and elemental composition mapping.
- Planetary protection/contamination control: Bio-cleaning, cataloguing of bio-contaminants, and transport modeling to ensure cached samples would be returnable.
- Rover navigation: On-board image processing and navigation to increase traverse rate.
- Precision landing: A major scientific priority is to improve access to complex terrain, which requires significantly narrowing the landing ellipse.

Based on a draft project schedule and a full JPL team experimental study, total project cost in dollars, not including launch vehicle, was estimated to be between $1.5-2.0 Billion.

== See also ==
- Astrobiology – Science concerned with life in the universe
- Astrobiology Field Laboratory – Canceled NASA Mars rover concept
- Biological Oxidant and Life Detection – Hypothetical Mars Mission
- ExoMars – Astrobiology programme of the European Space Agency
- Exploration of Mars
- Life on Mars – Assessments of possible life on Mars
- Mars 2020 – Astrobiology Mars rover mission by NASA
- Mars Exploration Rover – NASA mission to explore Mars via two rovers
- Mars sample return mission – Mars mission to collect rock and dust samples
- Mars Science Laboratory – Robotic mission that deployed the Curiosity rover to Mars in 2012
- Signs Of LIfe Detector – Spacecraft instrument to detect biosignatures
- Viking program – Pair of NASA landers and orbiters sent to Mars in 1976
