= Mars Environmental Dynamics Analyzer =

Environmental instrument on the Perseverance rover

- Operator: Spanish National Research Council
- Manufacturer: Spanish Astrobiology Center (CSIC-INTA)
- Instrument type: Suite of environmental sensors
- Function: Measure dust size, morphology, weather
- Mission duration: 1 Mars year

Properties
- Mass: 5.5 kg (12 lb)
- Power consumption: 17 watts

Host spacecraft
- Spacecraft: Mars 2020 Perseverance rover
- Launch date: July 30, 2020
- Rocket: Atlas V 541
- Launch site: Cape Canaveral SLC-41

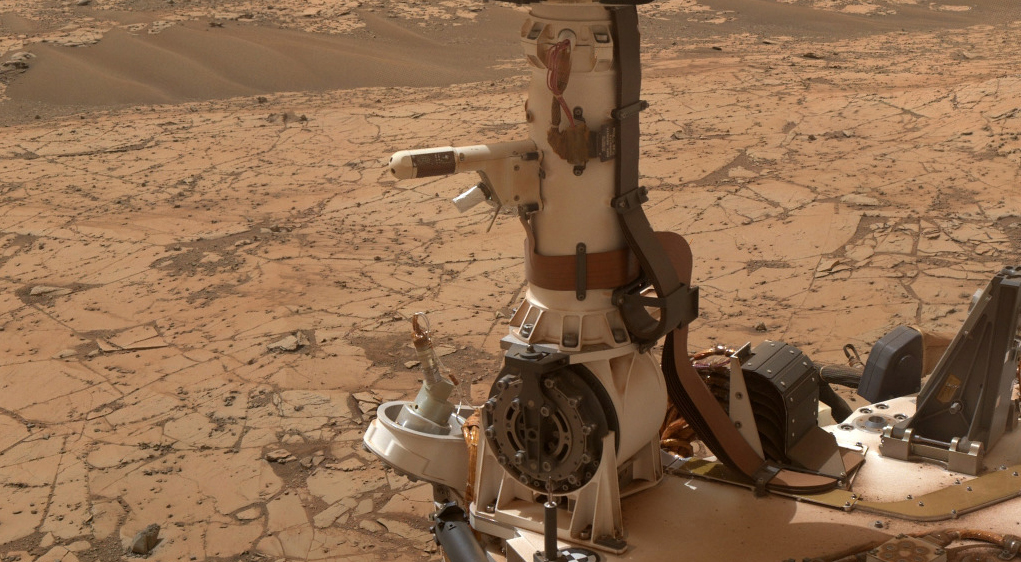
REMS instrument on Mars

The Mars Environmental Dynamics Analyzer (MEDA) is an instrument on board the Mars 2020 Perseverance rover designed to characterize dust size and morphology, as well as surface weather. This information is intended to inform future human exploration objectives, as dust sizes and shapes, daily weather reports, and information on radiation and wind patterns on Mars are critical for proper design of in situ resource utilization systems. MEDA is a follow-on project from REMS of the Curiosity rover mission, with a larger scope.

The instrument suite was developed and provided by the Spanish Astrobiology Center at the Spanish National Research Council in Madrid, Spain. On April 8, 2021, NASA reported the first MEDA weather report on Mars: for April 3–4, 2021, the high was "minus-7.6 degrees, and a low of minus-117.4 degrees ... [winds] gusting to ... 22 mph".

== Scientific team members ==
The Principal Investigator is José Antonio Rodríguez Manfredi and the Deputy Principal Investigator is Manuel de la Torre Juarez (JPL-NASA).

List of coinvestigators and their affiliations:

Nathan Bridges Johns Hopkins University/Applied Physics Laboratory Laurel, Maryland	Olga Prieto-Ballesteros Instituto Nacional de Tecnica Aeroespacial Madrid, Spain	Pamela Conrad NASA Goddard Space Flight Center Greenbelt, Maryland
Miguel Ramos Universidad de Alcala de Henares Madrid, Spain	Javier Gomez-Elvira Instituto Nacional de Tecnica Aeroespacial Madrid, Spain	Alfonso Saiz-Lopez Agencia Estatal Consejo Superior de Investigaciones Científicas Instituto de Quimica Fisica Rocasolano Madrid, Spain
Felipe Gomez-Gomez Instituto Nacional de Tecnica Aeroespacial Madrid, Spain	Agustin Sanchez-Lavega Universidad del Pais Vasco UPV/EHU Bilbao, Biscay, Spain	Ari-Matti Harri Ilmatieteen Laitos Helsinki, Finland
John SchofieldNASA Jet Propulsion Laboratory Pasadena, California	Mark LemmonTexas A & M College Station, Texas	Eduardo Sebastian Instituto Nacional de Tecnica Aeroespacial Madrid, Spain
German Martinez University of Michigan Ann Arbor, Michigan	Michael Smith NASA Goddard Space Flight Center Greenbelt, Maryland	Sara Navarro Lopez Instituto Nacional de Tecnica Aeroespacial Madrid, Spain
Leslie Tamppari NASA Jet Propulsion Laboratory Pasadena, California		Claire Newman Aeolis Research Pasadena, California

== Overview ==
Dust dominates Mars' weather the way that water dominates Earth's weather. Martian weather cannot be predicted unless dust behavior is studied and understood in the weather context. MEDA is a suite of environmental sensors designed to record dust optical properties and six atmospheric parameters: wind speed/direction, pressure, relative humidity, air temperature, ground temperature, and radiation (UV, visible, and IR ranges of the spectrum).

The technology used on MEDA was inherited from the REMS package operating on the Curiosity rover and the TWINS package on InSight lander. The sensors are located on the rover's mast and on the deck, front and interior of the rover's body. It records data whether the rover is active or not, at both day and night. The instruments will collect data for 5 minutes every 30 minutes.

Parameter	Performance/units
Mass	5.5 kg (12 lb)
Power	Max 17 watts
Data return	≈11 megabytes
Temperature	accuracy: 5 K resolution: 0.1 K
Relative humidity	accuracy of 10% in the 200-323 K range
Pressure	Range: 1 to 1150 Pa accuracy: 20 Pa resolution: 0.5 Pa
Radiation	eight upward looking photodiodes: • 255 +/– 5 nm for the O_{3} • 295 +/– 5 nm for the O_{3} • 250–400 nm for total UV • 450±40 nm for MastCam-Z cross-calibration • 650 +/– 25 nm for SuperCam cross-calibration • 880 +/–5 nm for MastCam-Z cross-calibration • 950 +/– 50 nm for NIR • one panchromatic (300-1000 nm) filter
Wind	accuracy: 2 m/sec resolution: 0.5 m/sec

== Components ==
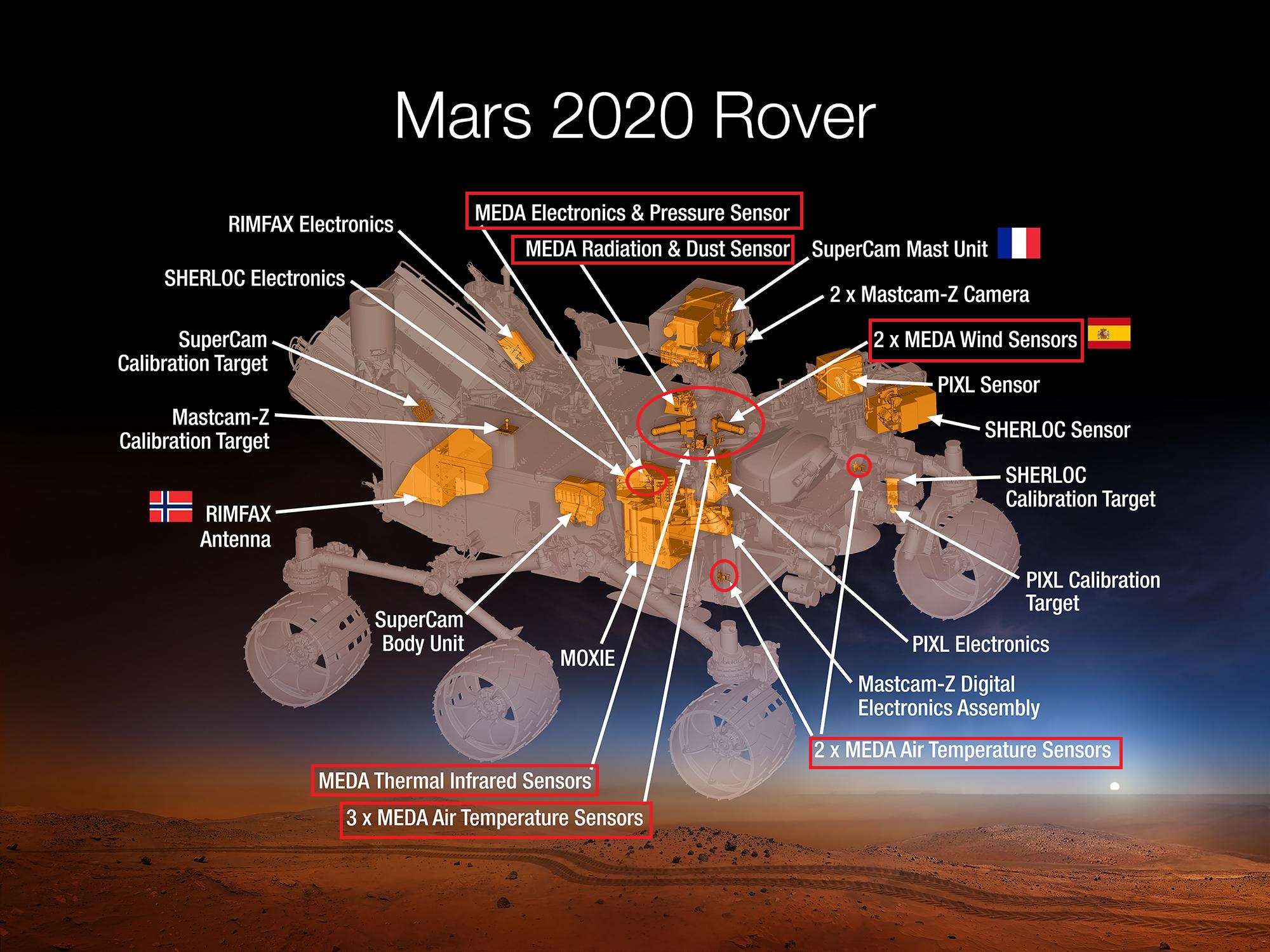
Various components of MEDA highlighted in this graphic of planned devices for the Perseverance rover

== See also ==
- Martian soil (aka regolith)
- Atmosphere of Mars
- Materials Adherence Experiment (1996 Mars dust experiment on Mars Pathfinder)
