= MicrOmega-IR =

- Operator: European Space Agency
- Manufacturer: Institut d'Astrophysique Spatiale, of the CNRS
- Instrument type: Infrared hyperspectral microscope
- Function: Subsurface composition
- Mission duration: ≥ 7 months
- Website: ExoMars Rover Instrument Suite

Properties
- Mass: ≈2 kg

Host spacecraft
- Spacecraft: Rosalind Franklin rover
- Operator: European Space Agency
- Launch date: NET 2028

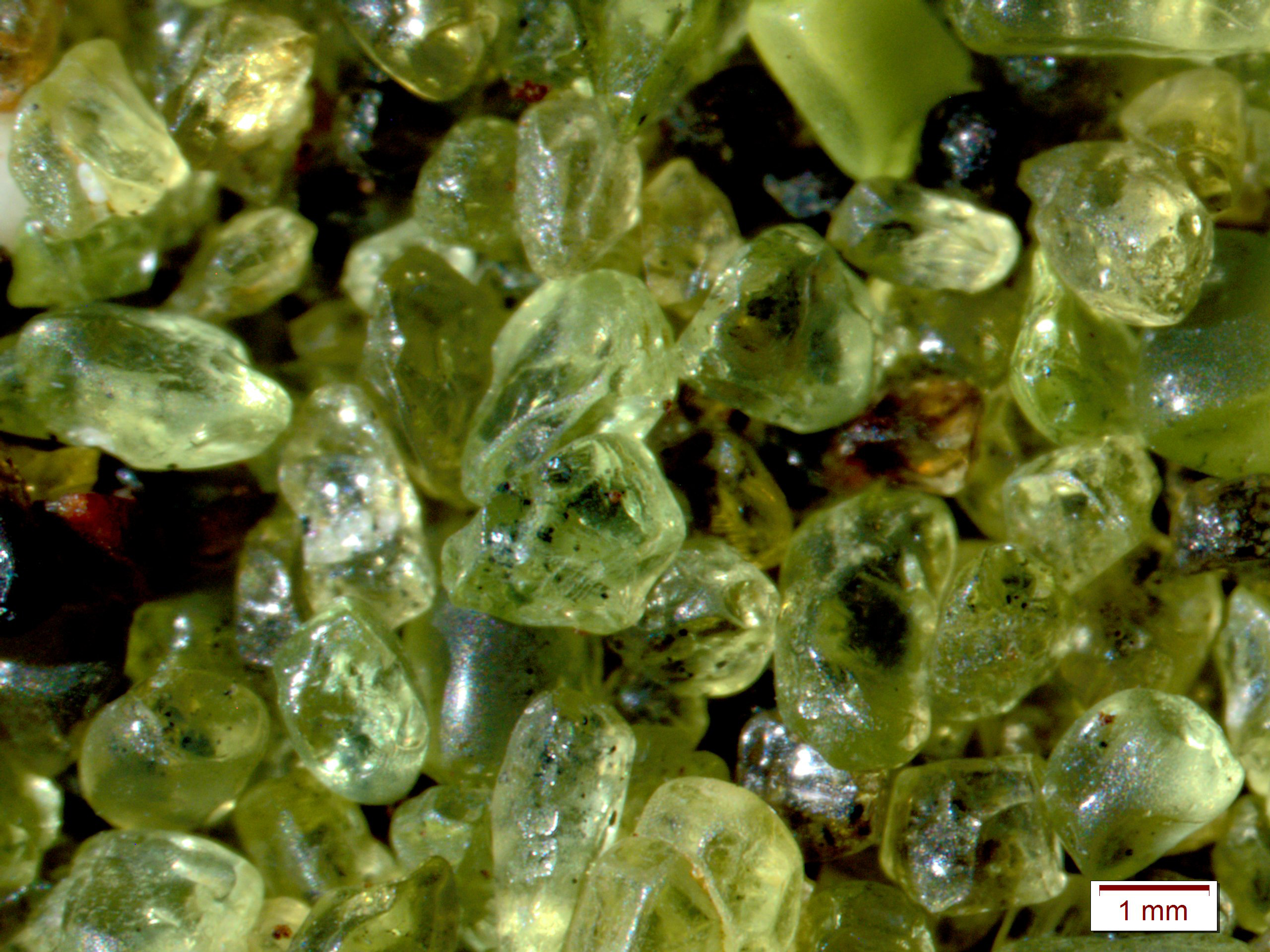
Grains of Earth olivine, one of the minerals MicroOmega is designed to detect

MicrOmega-IR is an infrared hyperspectral microscope that is part of the science payload on board the European Rosalind Franklin rover, tasked to search for biosignatures on Mars. The rover is planned to be launched not earlier than 2028. MicrOmega-IR will analyse in situ the powder material derived from crushed samples collected by the rover's core drill.

== Development ==
The MicrOmega mnemonic is derived from its French name Micro observatoire pour la mineralogie, l'eau, les glaces et l'activité; IR stands for infrared. It was developed by France's Institut d'Astrophysique Spatiale at the CNRS. France has also flown MicrOmega on other missions such as the 2011 Fobos-Grunt and the Hayabusa2 MASCOT mobile lander currently exploring asteroid Ryugu. France is also developing a variant called MacrOmega Near-IR Spectrometer for the Martian Moons Exploration (MMX) lander, a Japanese sample-return mission to Mars' moon Phobos.

The Principal Investigator of the MicrOmega-IR for the Rosalind Franklin rover is Jean-Pierre Bibring, a French astronomer and planetary scientist at the Institut d'Astrophysique Spatiale. Co-PIs are astrobiologists Frances Westall and Nicolas Thomas.

MicrOmega was developed by a consortium including:

- IAS (Orsay, France)
- LESIA (Meudon, France)
- CBM (Orléans, France)
- University Of Bern (Bern, Switzerland)
- Russian Space Research Institute (IKI) (Moscow, Russia)

== Overview ==
| MicrOmega-IR | Parameter/units |
|---|---|
| Type | Infrared hyperspectral microscope |
| Manufacturer | Institut d'Astrophysique Spatiale, of the CNRS |
| Spectral range | 0.9–4 μm |
| Spectral sampling | 20/cm from 0.95 μm to 3.65 μm |
| Imaging resolution | 20 μm^{2}/pixel |
| Field of view | 5 × 5 mm^{2} |
| Mass | ≈ 2 kilograms (4.4 lb) |

MicrOmega-IR is a visible and infrared hyperspectral microscope that is designed to characterize the texture and composition of crushed samples presented to the instrument. Its objective is to study mineral grain assemblages in detail to try to unravel their geological origin, structure and composition, including potential organics. These data will be vital for interpreting past and present geological processes and environments on Mars. Because MicrOmega-IR is an imaging instrument, it can also be used to identify grains that are particularly interesting, and assign them as targets for Raman and MOMA observations.

It is composed of 2 microscopes: MicrOmega/VIS has a spatial sampling of approximately 4 μm, working in 4 colors in the visible range. The other one is the MicrOmega/NIR hyperspectral microscope working in the spectral range 0.95 μm - 3.65 μm with a spatial sampling of 20 μm per pixel. Its main supporting components include:

- A monochromator based on an Acousto-optic modulator illumination system.
- Infrared magnification optics.
- Infrared focal plane.
- The thermal control system.
- The sample container.

The IR instrument uses a HgCdTe (Mercury-Cadmium-Telluride) matrix detector, the Sofradir Mars SW 320 x 256 pixels.

Examples of materials for identification, if present:

- pyroxene
- olivine
- ferric oxides
- hydrated phyllosilicates
- sulfates
- carbonates
- ices
- organics (organic as in organic chemistry)

== See also ==
- Astrobiology
- Life on Mars
- Mars Multispectral Imager for Subsurface Studies (Another ExoMars drill-related instrument)
