= Aerospace Logistics Technology Engineering Company =

Italian aerospace company

The Aerospace Logistics Technology Engineering Company (ALTEC) is an Italian aerospace company owned by the Italian Space Agency and Thales Alenia Space. It was founded in 2001 by Alenia Spazio and Consorzio Icarus, and is based in Turin. It will serve as the Control Centre for the two ExoMars missions to Mars.
