= Spanish Astrobiology Center =

Research institute

Astrobiology Center (Centro de Astrobiología)
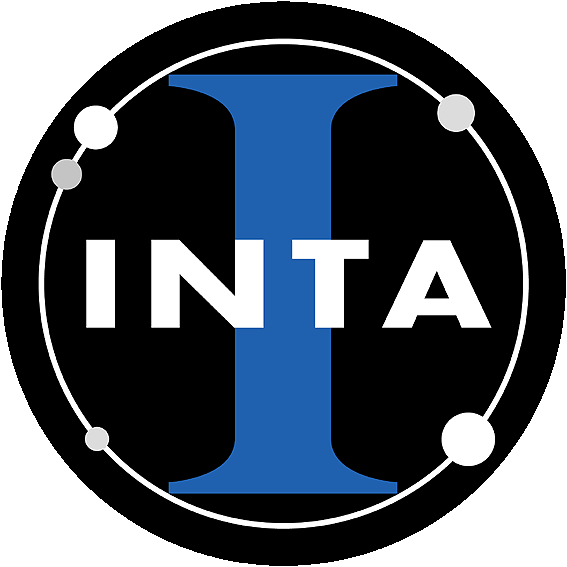
- Founder: Juan Pérez-Mercader
- Established: 19 November 1999
- Mission: Astrobiology research
- Focus: Origin of life
- Director: Víctor Parro García
- Owner: INTA-CSIC
- Location: Madrid, Spain
- Website: cab.inta-csic.es/en/

Spanish Astrobiology Center (Spanish: Centro de Astrobiología (CAB)) is a state-run institute in Spain dedicated to astrobiology research, and it is part of the National Institute of Aerospace Technology (INTA) as well as the Spanish National Research Council (CSIC). It was created in 1999 and it is affiliated with NASA Astrobiology Institute.

Its main objective is "understanding life as a consequence of the evolution of the matter and energy in the Universe."

== History ==
The foundation of Spain's Astrobiology Center (CAB) had its beginnings in 1998 when a group of Spanish scientists led by Juan Pérez-Mercader, presented a proposal of affiliation to the newly created NASA Astrobiology Institute (NAI). The affiliation was accepted and the center was officially created on 19 November 1999. It operated from offices at the National Institute of Aerospace Technology (INTA) until it moved to its own building inaugurated in January 2003.

== Organization ==
The Astrobiology Center is based in Madrid, Spain, its director is Víctor Parro García, and the Vicedirector is Francisco Najarro. The center is organized into several research and support units, and some of these are associated to Spanish universities, including the University of Valladolid and the Autonomous University of Madrid. The center is part of the National Institute of Aerospace Technology (INTA) as well as the Spanish National Research Council (CSIC).

The center is structured in several departments: Astrophysics Department, Molecular Evolution Department, Planetary Science and Habitability Department, Advanced Instrumentations Department, as well as several support units.

== Research ==
CAB has contributed to NASA in its mission to better characterize and find conditions for life in the Universe, and has prioritized Martian weather research and endurance of some extremophile microorganisms. CAB has developed instruments for multiple missions:

- Rover Environmental Monitoring Station (REMS) for the Curiosity rover
- Temperature and Winds for InSight (TWINS) on the InSight mission
- MEDA (Mars Environmental Dynamics Analyzer), which rides on NASA's Perseverance rover launched in 2020
- Raman Laser Spectrometer (RLS) for detecting minerals and potential biological pigments for the European Space Agency's Rosalind Franklin rover also to be launched in 2022.
- CAB is also developing a life-detector called Signs Of LIfe Detector (SOLID) to be potentially flown in a future mission.
