= Mars Multispectral Imager for Subsurface Studies =

Mars Multispectral Imager for Subsurface Studies (Ma_MISS)
- Operator: European Space Agency
- Manufacturer: INAF
- Instrument type: spectrometer
- Mission duration: ≥ 7 months
- Website: ExoMars Rover Instrument Suite

Properties
- Spectral band: Visible and NIR

Host spacecraft
- Spacecraft: Rosalind Franklin rover
- Operator: European Space Agency
- Launch date: NET 2028

Mars Multispectral Imager for Subsurface Studies (Ma_MISS) is a miniaturized imaging spectrometer designed to provide imaging and spectra by reflectance in the near-infrared (NIR) wavelength region and determine the mineral composition and stratigraphy. The instrument is part of the science payload on board the European Rosalind Franklin rover, tasked to search for biosignatures, and scheduled to launch not earlier than 2028. Ma_MISS is essentially inside a drill on the Rover, and will take measurements of the sub-surface directly.

Ma_MISS will help on the search for biosignatures by studying minerals and ices in situ before the collection of samples. The instrument is integrated within the Italian core drill system called DEEDRI, and it will be dedicated to in situ studies of the mineralogy inside the excavated holes in terms of visible and infrared spectral reflectance.

The Principal Investigator is Maria Cristina De Sanctis, from the INAF (Istituto Nazionale di Astrofisica) in Italy.

== Overview ==
MA-MISS	Parameter/units
Operational wavelengths	*Visible; *NIR: 0.4-2.2 μm
Focal distance between window and sample	< 1 mm
Spatial resolution	0.1 mm
Bore hole	≈2.5 cm diameter

The instrument is based on the design conceived by planetary scientist Angioletta Coradini in 2001. Ma_MISS is integrated in the Rosalind Franklin rover 2-metre DEEDRI core drill and shares its structure and electronics. It will perform visible and near-infrared spectroscopy (NIR) in the 0.4 to 2.2 μm range of the excavated borehole wall.

A 5 watt lamp and an optical fiber array will provide the illumination of the target (about 100 μm spot) as well as collect the scattered light from the target. An optical fiber carries the light to the spectrometer.

It will be operated periodically during the pauses of the drilling activity and will also be able to provide images of the hole wall by a sapphire window connected to an array of optical fibres. MA-MISS will provide important information about mineralogy, petrology, and geological processes of sedimentary materials of the Martian subsurface. It will also give insights about materials that have not been altered by surface processes such as erosion, weathering or oxidation.

The instrument is noted for its location inside the drill where it will have close contact with the Martian sub-surface. There is a window on the side of the drill, and as the drill turns it can take measurements around the circumference of the bore hole.

== Objectives ==
The ExoMars programme is an astrobiology project focused on the search for biosignatures in the subsurface of Mars, and to better understand the geological evolution and habitability of Mars. The study of the Martian subsurface will provide important constraints on the nature, timing and duration of alteration and sedimentation processes on Mars, as well as on the complex interactions between the surface and the atmosphere. The stated objectives of the Ma_MISS experiment are:

- Determine the composition of subsurface materials.
- Map the distribution of subsurface water and CO_{2} ices.
- Characterize grain size.
- Reconstruct a stratigraphic column for clues on subsurface geological processes.
