= Signs Of LIfe Detector =

Spacecraft instrument to detect biosignatures

Signs Of LIfe Detector (SOLID)
- Manufacturer: Spanish Astrobiology Center (CSIC-INTA)
- Instrument type: Immunoassay
- Function: life detection
- Website: auditore.cab.inta-csic.es/solid/en/instrument/

Properties
- Mass: < 7 kg (15 lb)

Signs Of LIfe Detector (SOLID) is an analytical instrument under development to detect extraterrestrial life in the form of organic biosignatures obtained from a core drill during planetary exploration.

The instrument is based on fluorescent immunoassays and it is being developed by the Spanish Astrobiology Center (CAB) in collaboration with the NASA Astrobiology Institute. SOLID is currently undergoing testing for use in astrobiology space missions that search for common biomolecules that may indicate the presence of extraterrestrial life, past or present. The system was validated in field tests and engineers are looking into ways to refine the method and miniaturize the instrument further.

== Science background ==
Modern astrobiology inquiry has emphasized the search for water on Mars, chemical biosignatures in the permafrost, soil and rocks at the planet's surface, and even biomarker gases in the atmosphere that may give away the presence of past or present life. The detection of preserved organic molecules of unambiguous biological origin is fundamental for the confirmation of present or past life, but the 1976 Viking lander biological experiments failed to detect organics on Mars, and it is suspected it was because of the combined effects of heat applied during analysis and the unexpected presence of oxidants such as perchlorates in the Martian soil. The recent discovery of near surface ground ice on Mars supports arguments for the long-term preservation of biomolecules on Mars.

SOLID demonstrated that antibodies are unaffected by acidity, heat and oxidants such as perchlorates, and it has emerged as a viable choice for an astrobiology mission directly searching for biosignatures.

For a time, the ExoMars' Rosalind Franklin rover was planned to carry a similar instrument called Life Marker Chip.

== Instrument ==
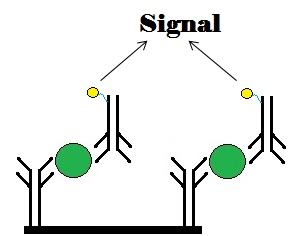
The two-site, non-competitive immunoassay consists of a biomolecule (in green) captured by an immobile antibody and "sandwiched" by a labeled antibody. When exposed to a laser beam, the fluorochrome label (in yellow) is excited and its fluorescent signal is measured.

SOLID was designed for automatic in situ detection and identification of substances from liquid and crushed samples under the conditions of outer space. The system uses hundreds of carefully selected antibodies to detect lipids, proteins, polysaccharides, and nucleic acids. These are complex biological polymers that could only be synthesized by life forms, and are therefore strong indicators —biosignatures— of past or present life.

SOLID consists of two separate functional units: a Sample Preparation Unit (SPU) for extractions by ultrasonication, and a Sample Analysis Unit (SAU), for fluorescent immunoassays. The antibody microarrays are separated in hundreds of small compartments inside a biochip only a few square centimeters in size.

SOLID instrument is able to perform both "sandwich" and competitive immunoassays using hundreds of well characterized and highly specific antibodies. The technique called "sandwich immunoassay" is a non-competitive immunoassay in which the analyte (compound of interest in the unknown sample) is captured by an immobilized antibody, then a labeled antibody is bound to the analyte to reveal its presence. In other words, the "sandwich" quantify antigens (i.e. biomolecules) between two layers of antibodies (i.e. capture and detection antibody). For the competitive assay technique, unlabeled analyte displaces bound labelled analyte, which is then detected or measured.

An optical system is set up so that a laser beam excites the fluorochrome label and a CCD detector captures an image of the microarray that can be measured.

The instrument is able to detect a broad range of molecular size compounds, from the amino acid size, peptides, proteins, to whole cells and spores, with sensitivities at 1–2 ppb (ng/mL) for biomolecules and 104 to 103 spores per milliliter. Some compartments in the microarray are reserved for samples of known nature and concentrations, that are used as controls for reference and comparison. SOLID instrument concept avoids the high-temperature treatments of other techniques that may destroy organic matter in the presence of Martian oxidants such as perchlorates.

== Testing ==
A field prototype of SOLID was first tested in 2005 in a simulated Mars drilling expedition called MARTE (Mars Analog Rio Tinto Experiment) where the researchers tested a drill 10 m (33 ft) in depth, sample-handling systems, and immunoassays relevant to the search for life in the Martian subsurface. MARTE was funded by the NASA Astrobiology Science and Technology for Exploring Planets (ASTEP) program. Using the sample cores, SOLID successfully detected several biological polymers in extreme environments in different parts of the world, including a deep South African mine, Antarctica's McMurdo Dry Valleys, Yellowstone, Iceland, Atacama Desert in Chile, and in the acid water of Rio Tinto.

Extracts obtained from Mars analogue sites on Earth were added to various perchlorate concentrations at −20 °C for 45 days and then the samples were analyzed with SOLID. The results showed no interference from acidity or from the presence of 50 mM perchlorate which is 20 times higher than that found at the Phoenix landing site. SOLID demonstrated that the chosen antibodies are unaffected by acidity, heat and oxidants such as perchlorates, and it has emerged as a viable choice for an astrobiology mission directly searching for biosignatures.

In 2018, another field test took place at the Atacama Desert with a rover called ARADS (Atacama Rover Astrobiology Drilling Studies) that carried a core drill, SOLID instrument, and another life detection system called Microfluidic Life Analyzer (MILA). MILA processes minuscule volumes of fluid samples to isolate amino acids, which are building blocks of proteins. The rover tested different strategies for searching for potential evidence of life in the soil, and established that roving, drilling and life detection can take place in concert.

=== Status ===
These tests validated the system for planetary exploration. Some improvements to be addressed in the future are instrument miniaturization, extraction protocols, and antibody stability under outer space conditions. SOLID would be one of the payloads of the proposed Icebreaker Life to Mars, or a lander to Europa.

== See also ==
- Biosensor
- Immunoassay
- Viking lander biological experiments
