= Mars Organic Molecule Analyser =

Astrobiological instrument

- Manufacturer: Max Planck Institute for Solar System Research, Goddard Space Flight Center, LISA and LATMOS
- Instrument type: ion trap mass spectrometer
- Function: search for organic compounds in Mars' soil
- Website: ExoMars Rover Instrument Suite

Properties
- Mass: 11.5 kg (25 lb)
- Resolution: 10 ppb

Host spacecraft
- Spacecraft: Rosalind Franklin rover
- Operator: ESA
- Launch date: 2028 (planned)

The Mars Organic Molecule Analyser (MOMA) is a mass spectrometer-based instrument on board the Rosalind Franklin rover to be launched in 2028 to Mars on an astrobiology mission. It will search for organic compounds (carbon-containing molecules) in the collected soil samples. By characterizing the molecular structures of detected organics, MOMA can provide insights into potential molecular biosignatures. MOMA will be able to detect organic molecules at concentrations as low as 10 parts-per-billion by weight (ppbw). MOMA examines solid crushed samples exclusively; it does not perform atmospheric analyses.

The Principal Investigator is Fred Goesmann, from the Max Planck Institute for Solar System Research in Germany.

== Overview ==
The goal of MOMA is to seek signs of past life on Mars (biosignatures) by analysing a wide range of organic compounds that may be found in drilled samples acquired from 2 meters below the Martian surface by the Rosalind Franklin rover. MOMA examines solid crushed samples only; it does not perform atmospheric analyses.

MOMA will first volatilize solid organic compounds so that they can be analysed by a mass spectrometer; this volatilisation of organic material is achieved by two different techniques: laser desorption and thermal volatilisation, followed by separation using four GC-MS columns. The identification of the organic molecules is then performed with an ion trap mass spectrometer.

=== Organic biosignatures ===
While there is no unambiguous Martian biosignature to look for, a pragmatic approach is to look out for certain molecules such as lipids and phospholipids that may be forming cell membranes which can be preserved over geological timescales. Lipids and other organic molecules may exhibit biogenic features that are not present in abiogenic organic material. If biogenic (synthesized by a life form), such compounds may be found at high concentrations only over a narrow range of molecular weights, unlike in carbonaceous meteorites where these compounds are detected over a broader range of molecular weights. In the case of sugars and amino acids, excessive molecular homochirality (asymmetry) is another important clue of their biological origin. The assumption is that life on Mars would be carbon-based and cellular as on Earth, so there are expected common building blocks such as chains of amino acids (peptides and proteins) and chains of nucleobases (RNA, DNA, or their analogs). Also, some isomers of high molecular weight organics can be potential biosignatures when identified in context with other supporting evidence. Other compounds targeted for detection will include fatty acids, sterols, and hopanoids.

=== Background organics ===
The surface of Mars is expected to have accumulated significant quantities of large organic molecules delivered by interplanetary dust particles and carbonaceous meteorites. MOMA's characterization of this fraction, may determine not only the abundance of this potential background for trace biomarker detection, but also the degree of decomposition of this matter by radiation and oxidation as a function of depth. This is essential in order to interpret the samples' origin in the local geological and geochemical context.

== Development ==
The components of MOMA related to GC-MS have heritage from the Viking landers, the COSAC on board the comet lander Philae, and SAM on board the Curiosity rover. But the methods applied in the past on board the Viking landers and the Curiosity rover are mostly destructive (pyrolysis), and consequently important information of the organic material is lost. Also, only volatile molecules can be detected and, only nonpolar molecules can get through the GC columns to the detector. MOMA will combine pyrolysis–derivatization with a less destructive method: LDMS (Laser Desorption Mass Spectrometry), which allows large and intact molecular fragments to be detected and characterized by the mass spectrometer (MS). The LDMS technique is not affected by these drawbacks, and it is unaffected to the presence of perchlorates, known to be abundant on the surface of Mars. Tandem mass spectrometry can then be used to further characterize these molecules.

The Max Planck Institute for Solar System Research is leading the development. International partners include NASA. The mass spectrometer (MS) and the main electronics of MOMA are provided by NASA's Goddard Space Flight Center, while the gas chromatography (GC) is provided by the two French institutes LISA and LATMOS. The UV-Laser is being developed by the Laser Zentrum Hannover. MOMA does not form a single compact unit, but is modular with numerous mechanical and thermal interfaces within the rover. The final integration and verification will be performed at Thales Alenia Space in Italy.

| Parameter | Units/performance |
|---|---|
| Mass | 11.5 kg (25 lb) |
| Power | Average: 65 W Maximum: 154 W |
| Operational temperature | −40 °C to +20 °C |
| Sensitivity | Organics present at ≥10 ppb |
| GC ovens | 32 (20 for pyrolysis/EGA, 12 for derivatization); Max temperature: 850 °C for pyrolysis/EGA, 600 °C for derivatization |
| Sample volume | up to 200 mm^{3} crushed sample per oven |
| Laser | UV (λ = 266 nm); Pulse energy: 13–130 μJ; Pulse duration: < 2.5 ns Spot size: ≈ 400 μm |
| Mass spectrometer (MS) | Mass range: 50–1000 Da; Mass isolation: ±5 Da |
