= Urey instrument =

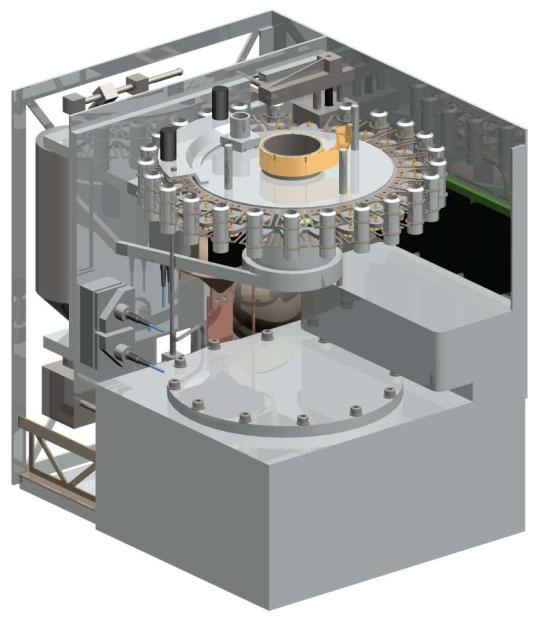
Urey design

The Urey instrument, or Urey: Mars Organic and Oxidant Detector was a developmental spacecraft instrument for detecting organic compounds including amino acids.

== Overview ==
It was funded by NASA and tested in the Atacama Desert in the early 2000s. Urey was selected by NASA for further development in support ExoMars or any future Mars mission that could use Urey along with Mars Organic Molecule Analyzer, or Moma in 2007, funded with 1.5 million USD total (750k each). Urey was a suite of instruments that built on 15 years of research into detecting organic molecules. Urey is a design for in situ biomarker detection, and it was tested in the early 2000s. The device would also study the mysterious oxidants in Mars regolith.

Urey was previously included on ExoMars rover, now the Rosalind Franklin rover, in one of its iterations, and would have searched for organic compounds in Martian rocks and soils as evidence for past life and/or prebiotic chemistry. Starting with a hot water extraction, only soluble compounds are left for further analysis. Sublimation, and capillary electrophoresis makes it possible to identify amino acids. The detection would be by laser-induced fluorescence, a highly sensitive technique, capable of parts-per-trillion sensitivity. These measurements would be made at a thousand times greater sensitivity than the Viking GCMS experiment, and would significantly advance our understanding of the organic chemistry of Martian soils. Urey would follow up on the Viking results which were inclusive and only sampled the very near surface.

Urey had been selected for a time to be on the Pasteur payload of the Rosalind Franklin rover, however, it was developed for any Mars mission not necessarily ExoMars and was funded independently by NASA.

One of the components of Urey was the Mars Oxidant Instrument (MOI) and it was developed by NASA's Ames Research Center.

Urey Suite:

- Subcritical Water Extractor
- Mars Organic Detector
- Micro-Capillary Electrophoresis Instrument
- Mars Oxidant Instrument

== Name ==
Urey is named after Harold Clayton Urey (1893 – 1981) for his contributions to chemistry and other studies including winning the Nobel Prize in Chemistry in 1934.

== See also ==
- Thermal and Evolved Gas Analyzer
- CheMin
- Sample Analysis at Mars
