= CheMin =

Instrument

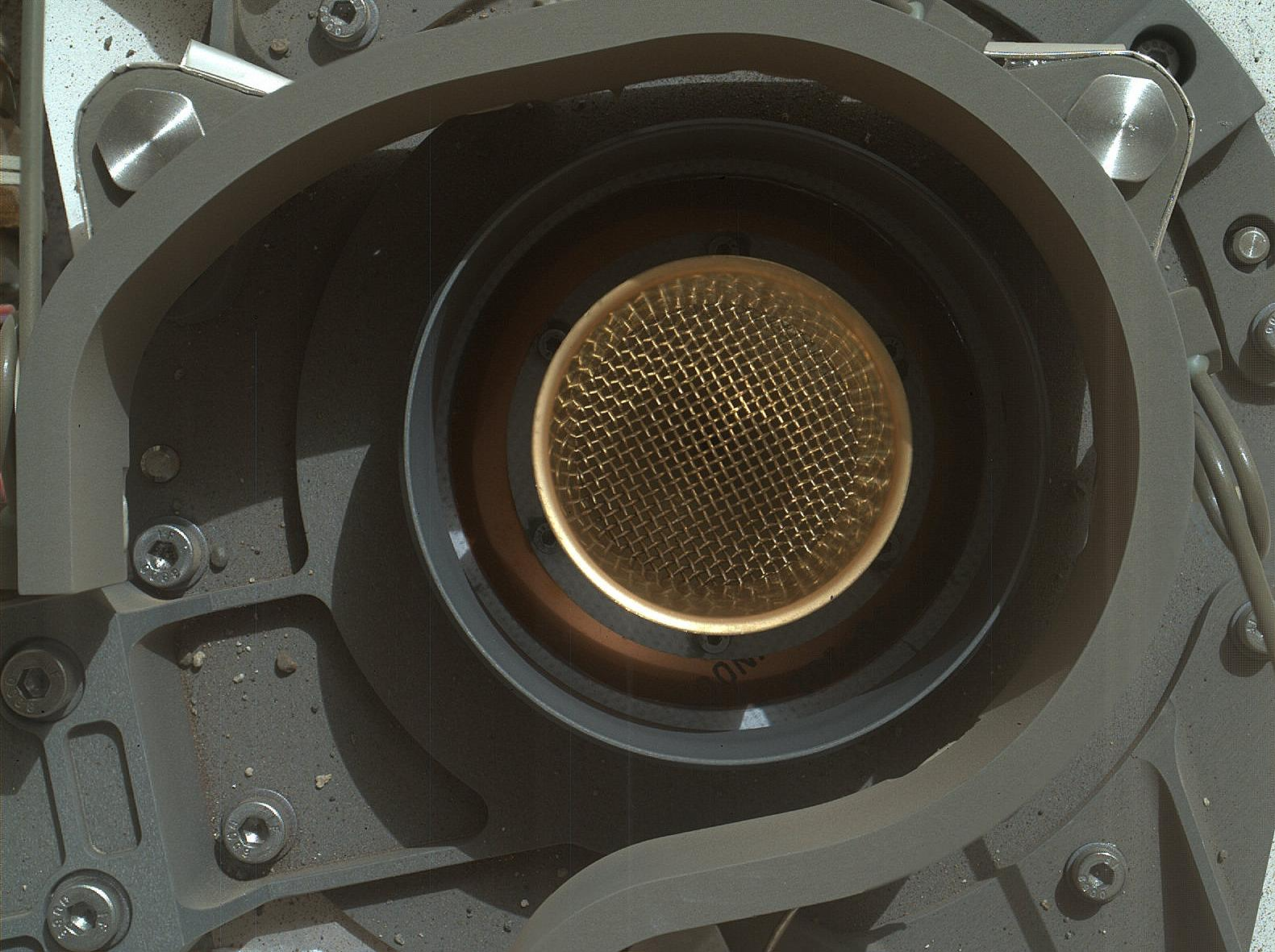
- Sample inlet of CheMin analyzer
- Operator: NASA
- Manufacturer: Ames Research Center
- Instrument type: X-ray diffraction
- Function: Surface composition
- Mission duration: November 26, 2011 – present
- Began operations: 17 October 2012

Host spacecraft
- Spacecraft: Curiosity rover
- Operator: NASA
- Launch date: 26 November 2011
- Rocket: Atlas V 541 (AV-028)
- Launch site: Cape Canaveral LC-41
- COSPAR ID: 2011-070A

CheMin, short for Chemistry and Mineralogy, is an instrument located in the interior of the Curiosity rover that is exploring the surface of Gale crater on Mars. David Blake, from NASA Ames Research Center, is the Principal Investigator.

CheMin identifies and quantifies the minerals present in rocks and soil delivered to it by the rover's robotic arm. By determining the mineralogy in rocks and soils, CheMin assesses the involvement of water in their formation, deposition, or alteration. In addition, CheMin data is useful in the search for potential mineral biosignatures, energy sources for life or indicators for past habitable environments.

CheMin aboard the Curiosity rover on Mars won the 2013 NASA Government Invention of the year award.

== Description ==
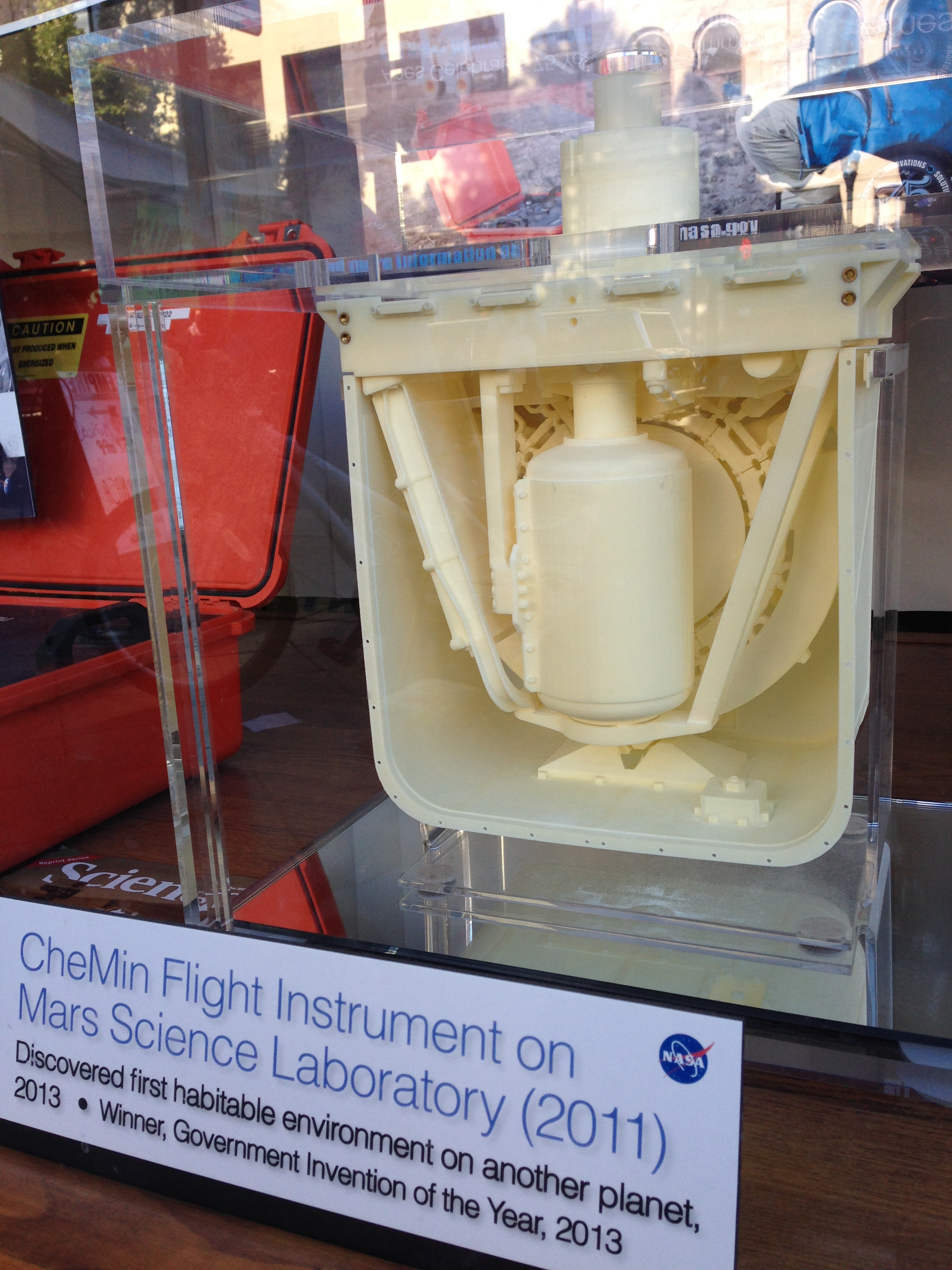
On public display in downtown Mountain View, California, as part of NASA Ames' 75th anniversary.

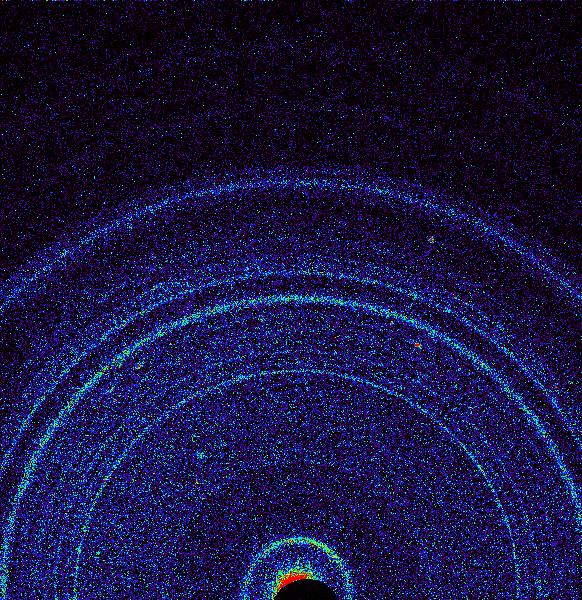
First X-ray diffraction view of the Martian soil – CheMin analysis reveals feldspar, pyroxenes, olivine and more (Curiosity rover, "Rocknest", October 17, 2012).

CheMin is an X-ray powder diffraction instrument that also has X-ray fluorescence capabilities. CheMin does not require the use of liquid reagents, instead, it utilizes a microfocus cobalt X-ray tube, a transmission sample cell and an energy-discriminating X-ray-sensitive CCD to produce simultaneous 2-D X-ray diffraction patterns and energy-dispersive histograms from powdered samples. Raw CCD frames are processed into data products on board the rover to reduce the data volume. These data products are transmitted to Earth for further processing analyses.

In operation, the collimated X-ray source produces and directs a beam through a transmission sample cell containing powdered material. A CCD (charge-coupled device) imager is positioned on the opposite side of the sample from the source and directly detects X-rays diffracted or fluoresced by the sample. The CCD can measure the charge generated by each photon, and hence its energy. Diffracted X-rays strike the detector and are identified by their energy, producing a two-dimensional image that constitutes the diffraction pattern of the sample. Both crystalline and amorphous materials can be analyzed in this fashion.

A maximum of 65 mm^{3} of sample material is delivered to a vibrated funnel system that penetrates the rover deck, although only about 10 mm^{3} of material is required to fill the sample cell which is transparent with a disc-shaped volume, with an 8 mm diameter and 175 μm thickness. The funnel contains a 1 mm mesh screen to limit the particle size. Five permanent cells are loaded with calibration standards; these are single minerals or synthetic ceramic. Each analysis may take up to 10 hours, spread out over two or more Martian nights.

=== Features ===
- Capacity: CheMin is planned to analyze as many as 74 dry samples, but it is capable of analyzing many more because its sample cells can be emptied and reused for additional analyses. Cross-contamination by cell reuse is expected to be less than 5%. CheMin does not have the capability to store previously analyzed samples for later reanalysis.
- Detection limits: able to detect individual minerals that are present at the 3% level and above.
- Accuracy: for minerals that are present in concentrations of 12% and above, CheMin is able to state the absolute amount present ± 1.5%
- Precision: 10%

== Timeline ==
On October 17, 2012 at "Rocknest", the first X-ray diffraction analysis of Martian soil was performed. The results revealed the presence of several minerals, including feldspar, pyroxenes and olivine, and suggested that the Martian soil in the sample was similar to the "weathered basaltic soils" of Hawaiian volcanoes. The paragenetic tephra from a Hawaiian cinder cone has been mined to create Martian regolith simulant for researchers to use since 1998.

CheMin analyzed many rocks. Some contained carbonates in the form of crystalline siderite (FeCO_{3}). One rock contained over 10 % of the mineral. The rocks also were composed of plagioclase with the elements sodium (Na)–, Ca-, and aluminum (Al)–, as well as Ca- and Mg-bearing silicate mineral pyroxene. Other minerals found were calcium sulfates, magnesium sulfates, different amounts of iron oxyhydroxides, and an unidentified x-ray amorphous material. Rover’s Chemistry and Mineralogy (CheMin) instrument uses x-ray diffraction to determine sample mineralogy. The names of the rock formations and drill sites are CA, Canaima; TC, Tapo Caparo; UB, Ubajara; and SQ, Sequoia. V

== Typical results ==
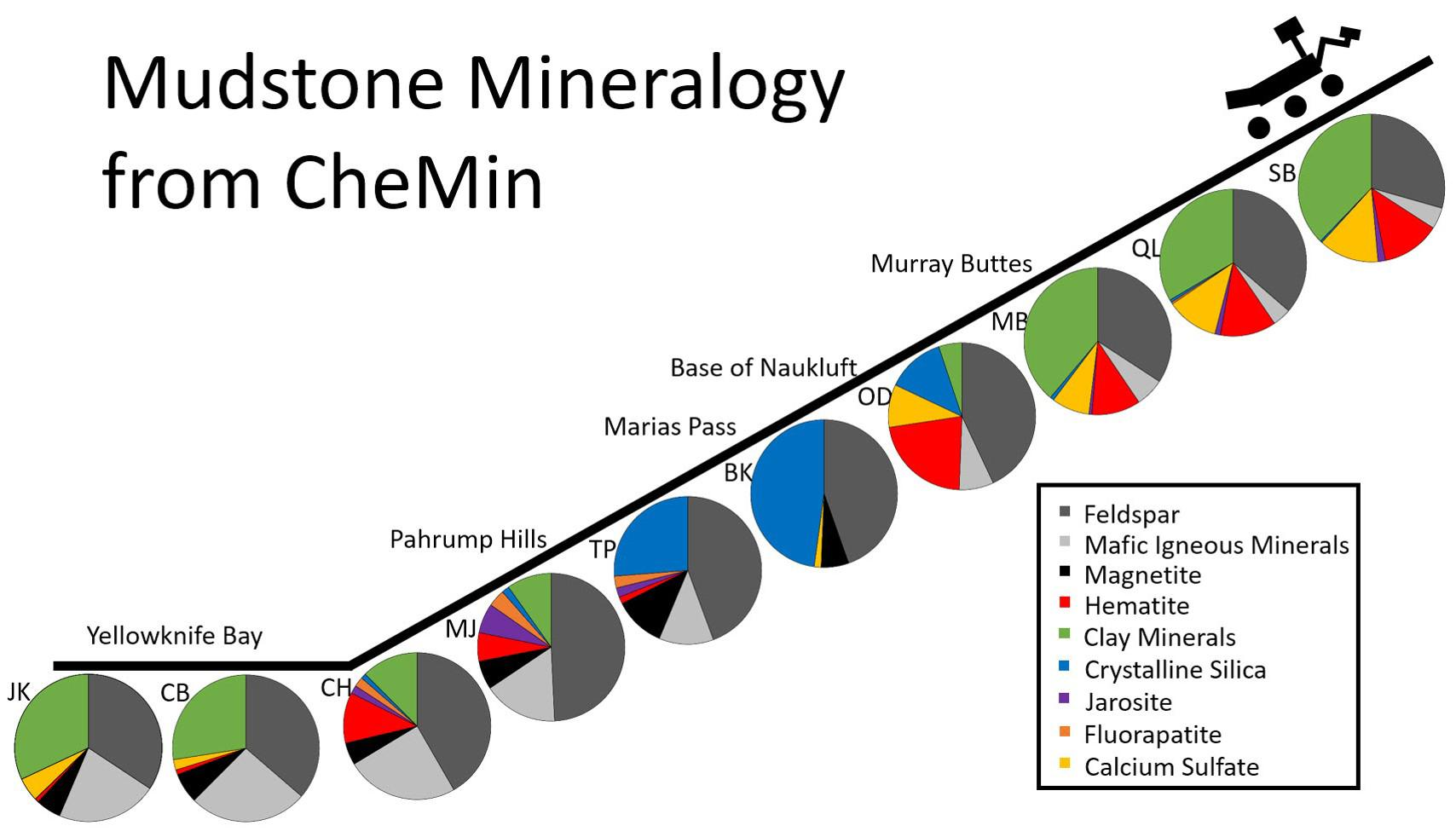
Curiosity rover – Mudstone Mineralogy – 2013 to 2016 on Mars (CheMin; December 13, 2016)

== See also ==
- Thermal and Evolved Gas Analyzer (Phoenix lander)
- Urey instrument
