= Lunar regolith simulant =

Recreation of lunar dust

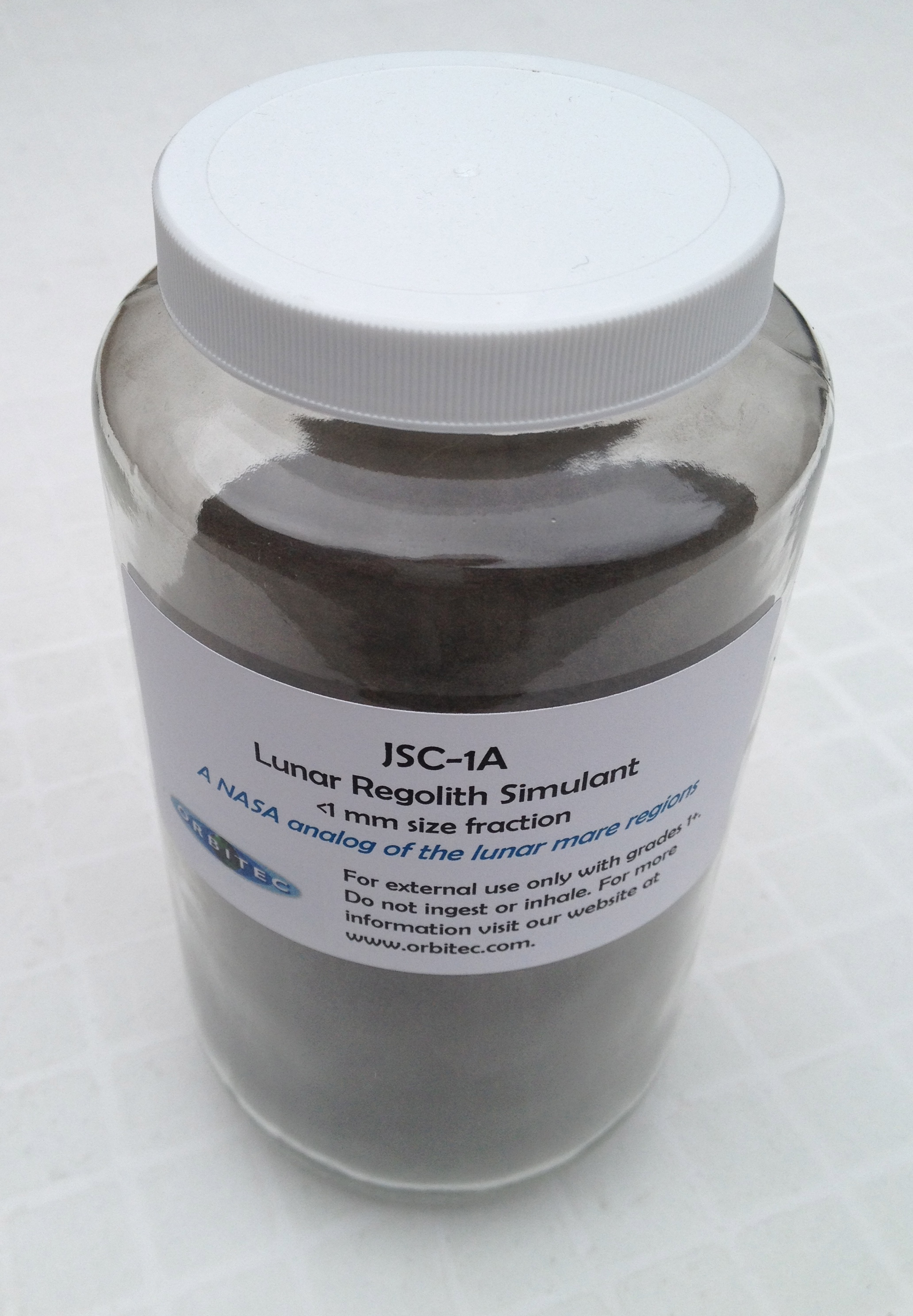
A 1 kg jar of JSC-1A lunar simulant

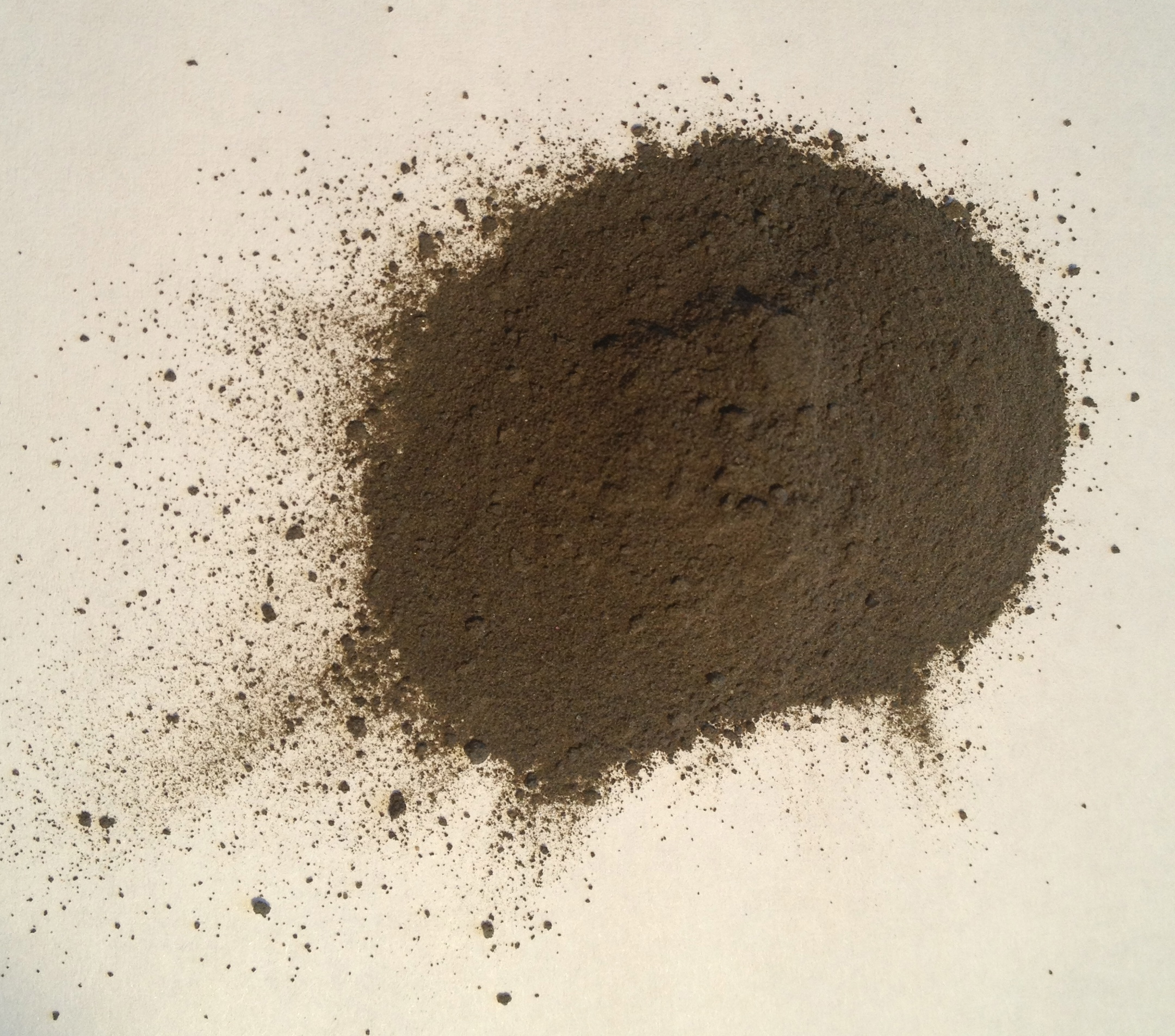
Approximately 15 g of JSC-1A

A lunar regolith simulant is a terrestrial material synthesized in order to approximate the chemical, mechanical, engineering, mineralogical, or particle-size distribution properties of lunar regolith. Lunar regolith simulants are used by researchers who wish to research the materials handling, excavation, transportation, and uses of lunar regolith. Samples of actual lunar regolith are too scarce, and too small, for such research, and have been contaminated by exposure to Earth's atmosphere.

== Early simulants ==
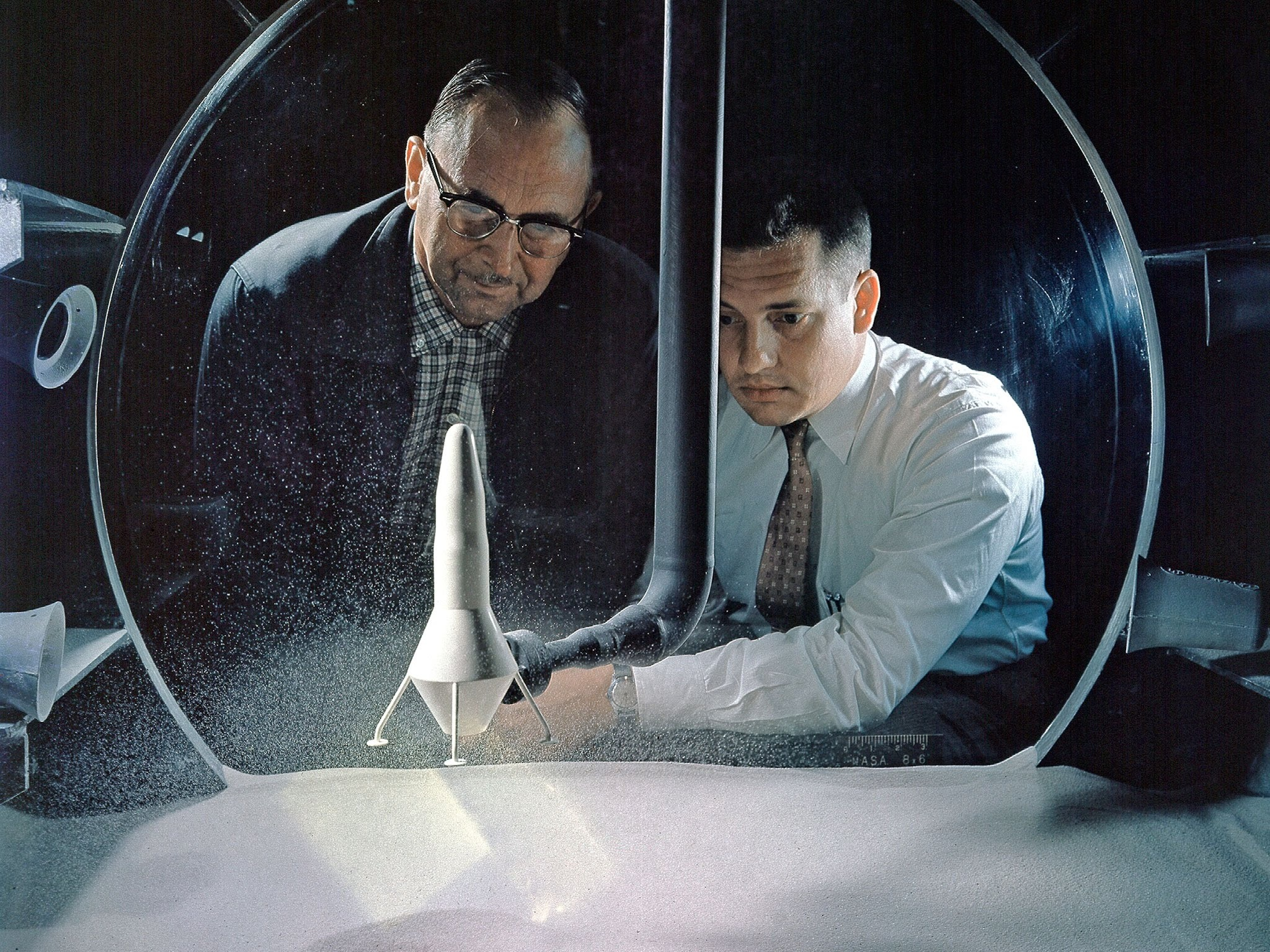
NASA Researchers view a demonstration of the moon dust simulator in the 8- by 6-Foot Supersonic Wind Tunnel facility at the NASA Lewis Research Center (1960).

In the run-up to the Apollo program, crushed terrestrial rocks were first used to simulate the anticipated soils that astronauts would encounter on the lunar surface. In some cases the properties of these early simulants were substantially different from actual lunar soil, and the issues associated with the pervasive, fine-grained, sharp dust grains on the Moon came as a surprise.

== Later simulants ==
After Apollo and particularly during the development of the Constellation program, there was a large proliferation of lunar simulants produced by different organizations and researchers. Many of these were given three-letter acronyms to distinguish them (e.g., MLS-1, JSC-1), and numbers to designate subsequent versions. These simulants were broadly divided into highlands or mare soils, and were usually produced by crushing and sieving analogous terrestrial rocks (anorthosite for highlands, basalt for mare). Returned Apollo and Luna samples were used as reference materials in order to target specific properties such as elemental chemistry or particle size distribution. Many of these simulants were criticized by prominent lunar scientist Larry Taylor for a lack of quality control and wasted money on features like nanophase iron that had no documented purpose.

=== JSC-1 and -1A ===
JSC-1 (Johnson Space Center Number One) was a lunar regolith simulant that was developed in 1994 by NASA and the Johnson Space Center. Its developers intended it to approximate the lunar soil of the maria. It was sourced from a basaltic ash with a high glass content.

In 2005, NASA contracted with Orbital Technologies Corporation (ORBITEC) for a second batch of simulant in three grades:

- JSC-1AF, fine, 27 μm average size
- JSC-1A, a reproduction of JSC 1, less than 1 mm size
- JSC-1AC, coarse, a distribution of sizes < 5 mm

NASA received 14 metric tons of JSC-1A, and one ton each of AF and AC in 2006. Another 15 tons of JSC-1A and 100 kg of JSC-1F were produced by ORBITEC for commercial sale, but ORBITEC is no longer selling simulants and was acquired by the Sierra Nevada Corporation. An 8-ton sand box of commercial JSC-1A is available for daily rental from the NASA Solar System Exploration Research Virtual Institute (SSERVI).

JSC-1A can geopolymerize in an alkaline solutions resulting in a hard, rock-like, material. Tests show that the maximum compressive and flexural strength of the 'lunar' geopolymer is comparable to that of conventional cements.

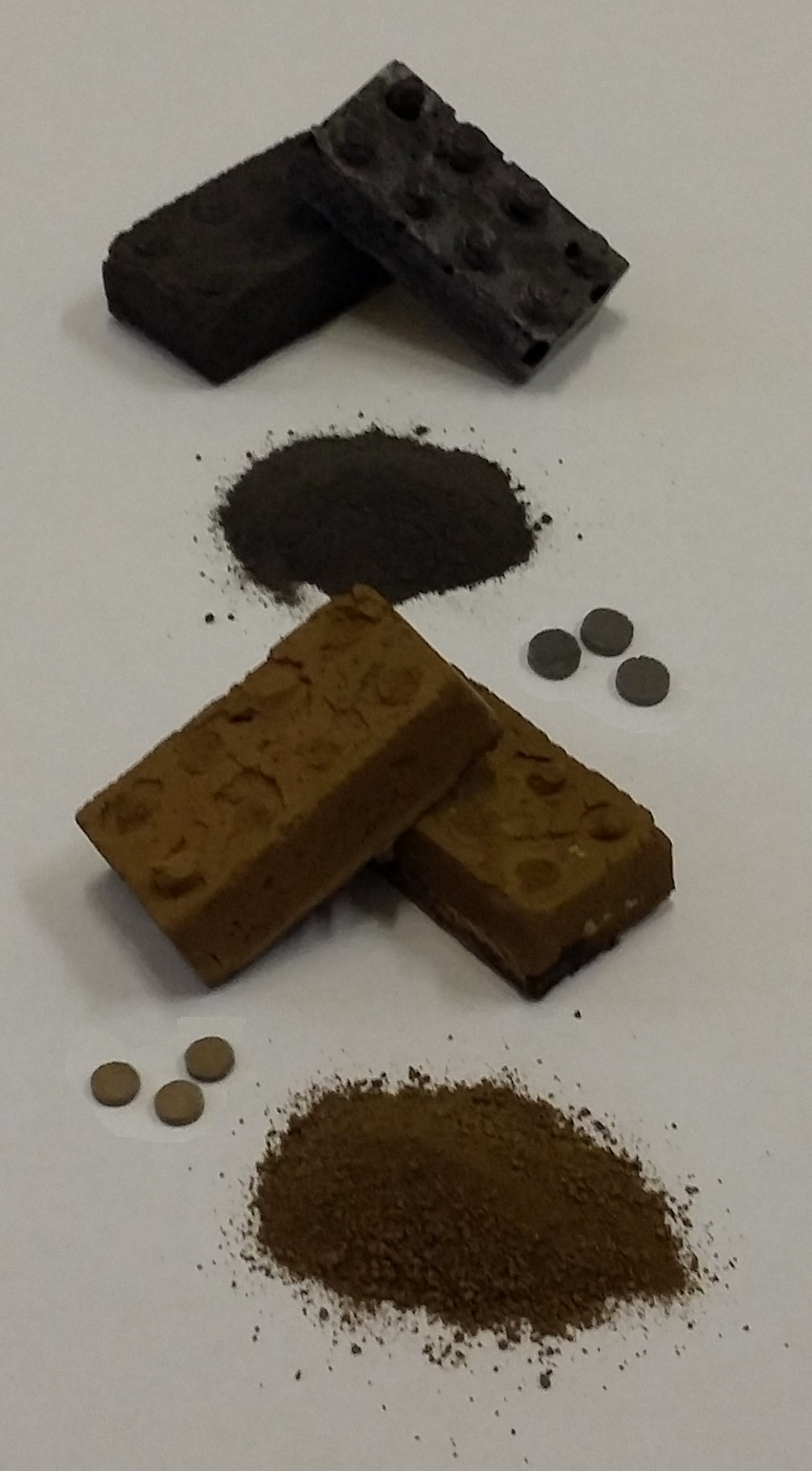
Geopolymers from lunar (JSC-1A) and Martian (JSC MARS-1A) dust simulants produced at the University of Birmingham

JSC-1 and JSC-1A are now no longer available outside of NASA centers.

=== NU-LHT and OB-1 ===
Two lunar highlands simulants, the NU-LHT (lunar highlands type) series and OB-1 (olivine-bytownite) were developed and produced in anticipation of the Constellation activities. Both of these simulants are sourced mostly from rare anorthosite deposits on the Earth. For NU-LHT the anorthosite came from the Stillwater complex, and for OB-1 it came from the Shawmere Anorthosite in Ontario. Neither of these simulants were widely distributed.

== Recent simulants ==
Most of the previously developed lunar simulants are no longer being produced or distributed outside of NASA. Multiple companies have tried to sell regolith simulants for profit, including Zybek Advanced Products, ORBITEC, and Deep Space Industries. None of these efforts have seen much success. NASA is unable to sell simulants, or distribute unlimited amounts for free; however, NASA can award set amounts of simulant to grant winners.

Several lunar simulants have been developed recently and are either being sold commercially or are available for rent inside large regolith bins. These include the OPRL2N Standard Representative Lunar Mare Simulant and Standard Representative Lunar Highland Simulant. Off Planet Research also produces customized simulants for specific locations on the Moon including lunar polar icy regolith simulants that include the volatiles identified in the LCROSS mission.

Other simulants include Lunar Highlands Simulant (LHS-1) and Lunar Mare Simulant (LMS-1) produced and distributed by the not-for-profit Exolith Lab run out of the University of Central Florida.

In Europe, recent startups like Hispansion have developed a new series of simulants, TerraLun with a highlands (TLH-0) and a low titanium mare (TLM-0) variants, that offer high fidelity according to NASA FoM metrics and high volume production. They are yet to be used systematically in research.

Indian Space Research Organisation has developed its own lunar highland soil simulant called LSS-ISAC1 for its Chandrayaan programme. The raw material for this simulant was sourced from Sithampoondi and Kunnamalai villages in Tamil Nadu.

In 2020, a team of independent researchers from Thailand also developed the Thailand Lunar Simulant - Batch 1 (TLS-1) using domestic sources—the first ever successful simulant production attempt in the country that is based on the properties of the Apollo 11 sample. Further applications in the field of space and material engineering were also made using the produced simulant.

== See also ==
- Lunar soil
- Martian regolith simulant
- Moon rock
