= Palagonite =

Igneous rock

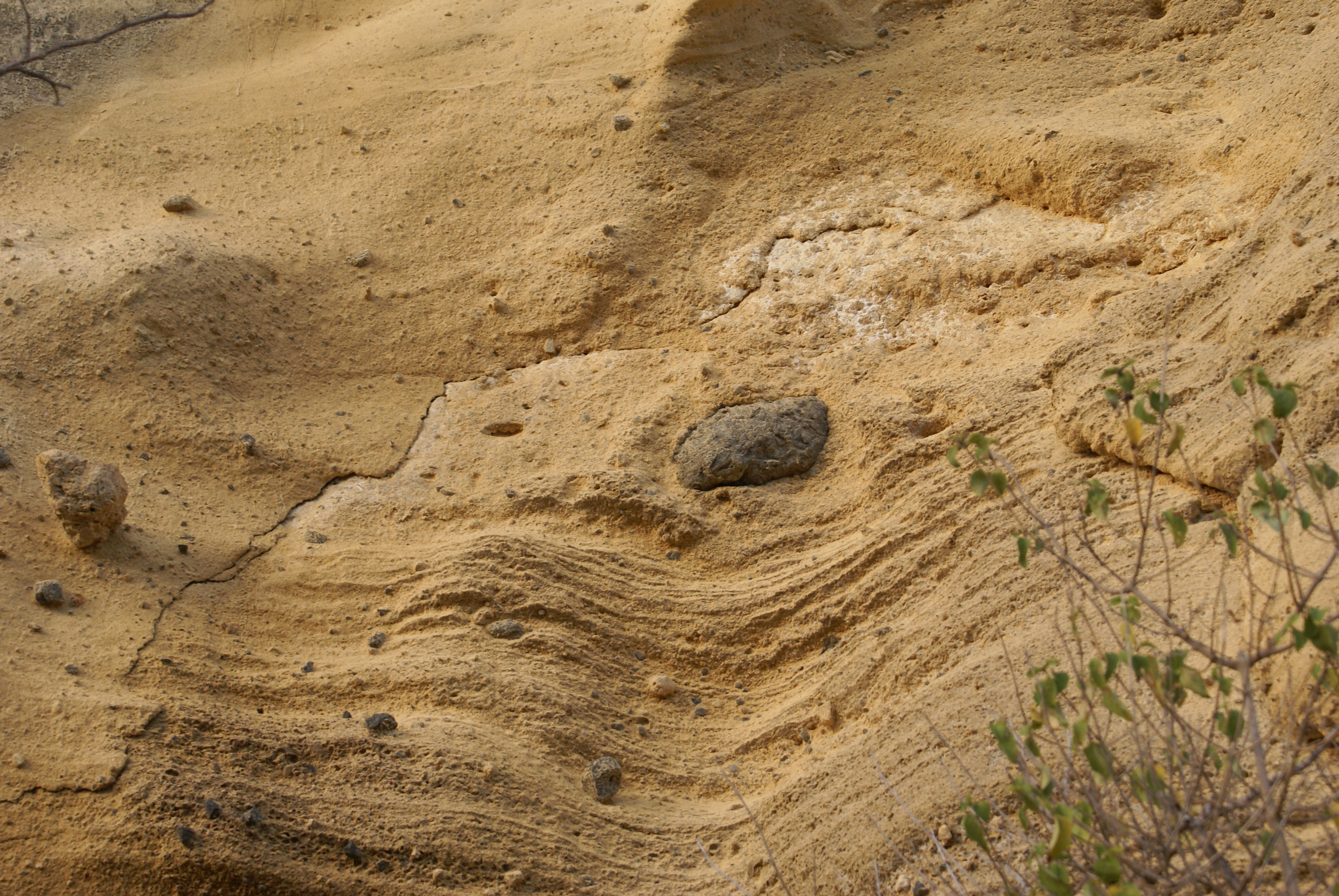
Palagonite layers at Moya Beach, Mayotte.

Palagonite is an alteration product from the interaction of water with volcanic glass of chemical composition similar to basalt. Palagonite can also result from the interaction between water and basalt melt. The water flashes to steam on contact with the hot lava and the small fragments of lava react with the steam to form the light-colored palagonite tuff cones common in areas of basaltic eruptions in contact with water. An example is found in the pyroclastic cones of the Galapagos Islands. Charles Darwin recognized the origin of these cones during his visit to the islands. Palagonite can also be formed by a slower weathering of lava into palagonite, resulting in a thin, yellow-orange rind on the surface of the rock. The process of conversion of lava to palagonite is called palagonitization.

Palagonite soil is a light yellow-orange dust, comprising a mixture of particles ranging down to sub-micrometer sizes, usually found mixed with larger fragments of lava. The color is indicative of the presence of iron in the +3 oxidation state, embedded in an amorphous matrix.

Palagonite tuff is a tuff composed of sideromelane fragments and coarser pieces of basaltic rock, embedded in a palagonite matrix. A composite of sideromelane aggregate in palagonite matrix is called hyaloclastite.

== On Mars ==
Based on infrared spectroscopy, the fine-grained component of Mauna Kea palagonite is the terrestrial material with the best match to the spectral properties of Martian dust, and is believed to be similar in composition and in origin to dusty component of the surface regolith of Mars. The palagonitic tephra from a cinder cone in Hawaii has been used to create Martian regolith simulant for researchers. The spectroscopic signature of palagonitic alteration on Mars is used as evidence for the existence of water on Mars.
