= Martian regolith =

Fine regolith found on the surface of Mars

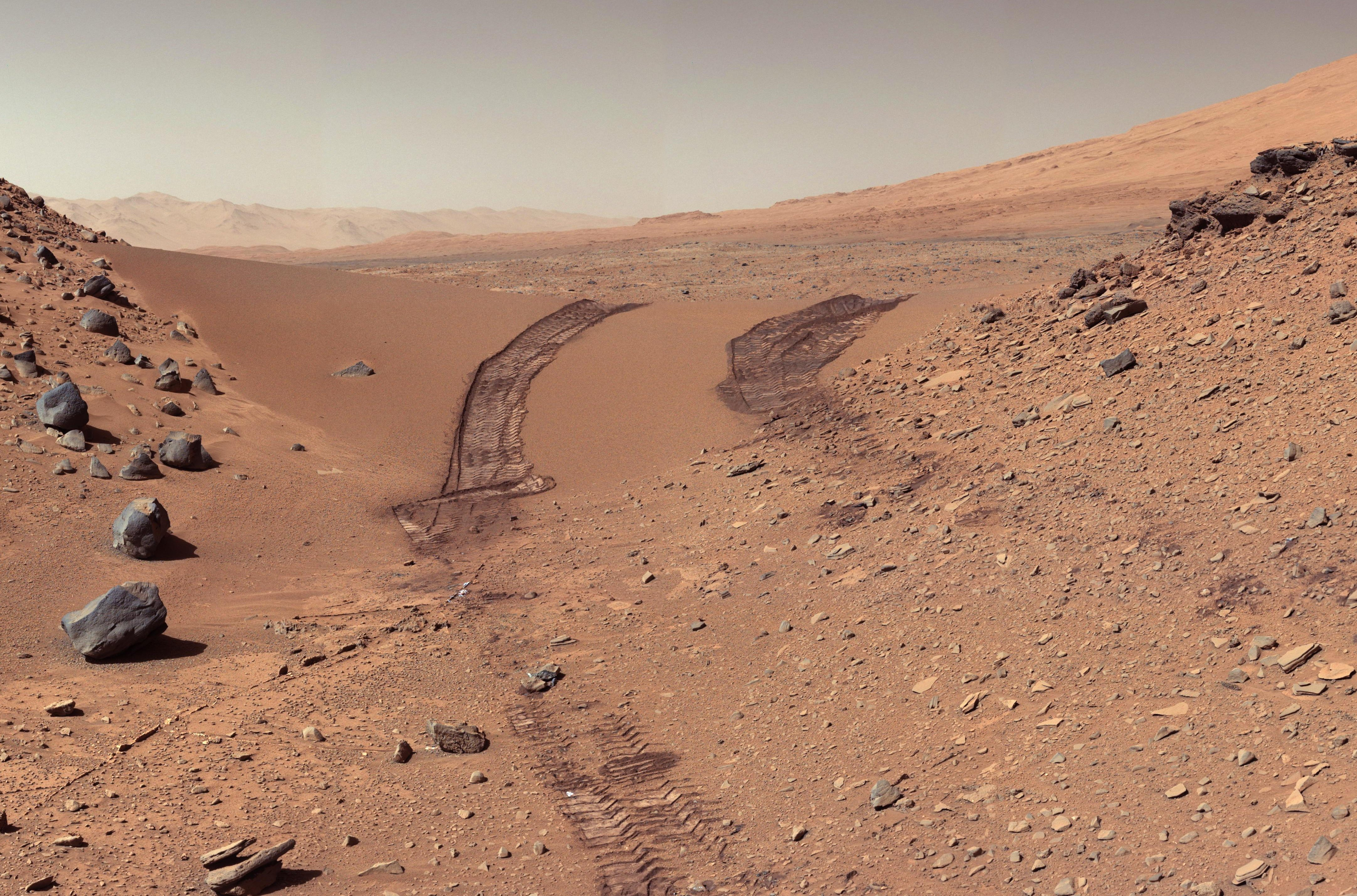
Curiosity's view of Martian soil and boulders after crossing the "Dingo Gap" sand dune (February 9, 2014; image transformed to Earth-like atmospheric view, original image).

Martian regolith is the fine blanket of unconsolidated, loose, heterogeneous superficial deposits covering the surface of Mars. The term Martian soil typically refers to the finer fraction of regolith. So far, no samples have been returned to Earth, the goal of a Mars sample-return mission, but the soil has been studied remotely with the use of Mars rovers and Mars orbiters. Its properties can differ significantly from those of terrestrial soil, including its toxicity due to the presence of perchlorates.

== Definitions ==
On Earth, the term "soil" usually includes organic content. In contrast, planetary scientists adopt a functional definition of soil to distinguish it from rocks. Rocks generally refers to 10 cm scale and larger materials (e.g., fragments, breccia, and exposed outcrops) with high thermal inertia, with areal fractions consistent with the Viking Infrared Thermal Mapper (IRTM) data, and immobile under current aeolian (wind) conditions. Consequently, rocks are classified as grains exceeding the size of cobbles on the Wentworth scale.

This approach enables agreement across Martian remote sensing methods that span the electromagnetic spectrum from gamma to radio waves. Soil refers to all other, typically unconsolidated, material including those sufficiently fine-grained to be mobilized by wind. Soil consequently encompasses a variety of regolith components identified at landing sites. Typical examples include: bedform (a feature that develops at the interface of fluid and a moveable bed such as ripples and dunes), clasts (fragments of pre-existing minerals and rock such as sediment deposits), concretions, drift, dust, rocky fragments, and sand. The functional definition reinforces a recently proposed generic definition of soil on terrestrial bodies (including asteroids and satellites) as an unconsolidated and chemically weathered surficial layer of fine-grained mineral or organic material exceeding centimeter scale thickness, with or without coarse elements and cemented portions.

Martian dust generally connotes even finer materials than Martian soil, the fraction which is less than 30 micrometres in diameter. Disagreement over the significance of soil's definition arises due to the lack of an integrated concept of soil in the literature. The pragmatic definition "medium for plant growth" has been commonly adopted in the planetary science community but a more complex definition describes soil as "(bio)geochemically/physically altered material at the surface of a planetary body that encompasses surficial extraterrestrial telluric deposits". This definition emphasizes that soil is a body that retains information about its environmental history and that does not need the presence of life to form.

== Toxicity ==
Mars Perseverance rover – wind lifts a massive dust cloud (June 18, 2021)

Martian regolith is toxic, due to relatively high concentrations of perchlorate compounds containing chlorine. Elemental chlorine was first discovered during localised investigations by Mars rover Sojourner, and has been confirmed by Spirit, Opportunity and Curiosity. The Mars Odyssey orbiter has also detected perchlorates across the surface of the planet.

Perchlorates such as calcium perchlorate were first discovered on Mars in 2008 by the NASA Phoenix lander. The levels detected in the Martian regolith are around 0.5%, which is a level considered toxic to humans. These compounds are also toxic to plants. A 2013 terrestrial study found that a 0.5 g per liter concentration caused:

- a significant decline in the chlorophyll content in plant leaves
- reduction in the oxidizing power of plant roots
- reduction in the size of the plant both above and below ground
- an accumulation of concentrated perchlorates in the leaves

The report noted that one of the types of plant studied, Eichhornia crassipes, seemed resistant to the perchlorates and could be used to help remove the toxic salts from the environment, although the plants themselves would end up containing a high concentration of perchlorates as a result. There is evidence that some bacterial lifeforms are able to overcome perchlorates by physiological adaptations to increasing perchlorate concentrations, and some even live off them. In 2022, NASA and the U.S. National Science Foundation co-funded a multi-year grant to study the use of the bacteria Dehalococcoides mccartyi to break down perchlorates into harmless chlorides and oxygen. However, the added effect of the high levels of UV reaching the surface of Mars breaks molecular bonds, creating even more dangerous chemicals which in lab tests on Earth were shown to be more lethal to bacteria than the perchlorates alone. This, along with cold temperature, would add to the need to grow plants indoors.

The chlorine in Martian perchlorates is thought to originate from volcanoes or aqueous weathering of basalt, and the oxygen likely originates from the atmosphere, possibly with some contribution from minerals. It is hypothesized that perchlorate may be formed either by reactions of chlorine with ozone, or by oxidation at grain surfaces, or by reactions enhanced with chlorine dioxide, or through reactions with free radicals produced by electrostatic discharge in dust storms.

=== Dust hazard ===
The InSight lander at its mission start and end having been covered by Martian dust eventually rendering it inoperable

The potential danger to human health of the fine Martian dust has long been recognized by NASA. A 2002 study warned about the potential threat, and a study was carried out using the most common silicates found on Mars: olivine, pyroxene and feldspar. It found that the dust reacted with small amounts of water to produce highly reactive molecules that are also produced during the mining of quartz and known to produce lung disease in miners on Earth, including cancer (the study also noted that lunar dust may be worse).

Following on from this, since 2001 NASA's Mars Exploration Program Analysis Group (MEPAG) has had a goal to determine the possible toxic effects of the dust on humans. In 2010, the group noted that although the Phoenix lander and the rovers Spirit and Opportunity had contributed to answering this question, none of the instruments have been suitable for measuring the particular carcinogens that are of concern. The Mars 2020 rover is an astrobiology mission that will also make measurements to help designers of a future human expedition understand any hazards posed by Martian dust. It employs the following related instruments:

- MEDA, a set of atmospheric sensors that measure various things including radiation, and dust size and shape.
- PIXL, an X-ray fluorescence spectrometer to determine the fine scale elemental composition of Martian surface materials.
- SHERLOC, an ultraviolet Raman spectrometer that uses fine-scale imaging and an ultraviolet (UV) laser to determine fine-scale mineralogy

The Mars 2020 rover mission will cache samples that could potentially be retrieved by a future mission for their transport to Earth. Any questions about dust toxicity that have not already been answered in situ can then be investigated by labs on Earth.

== Observations ==
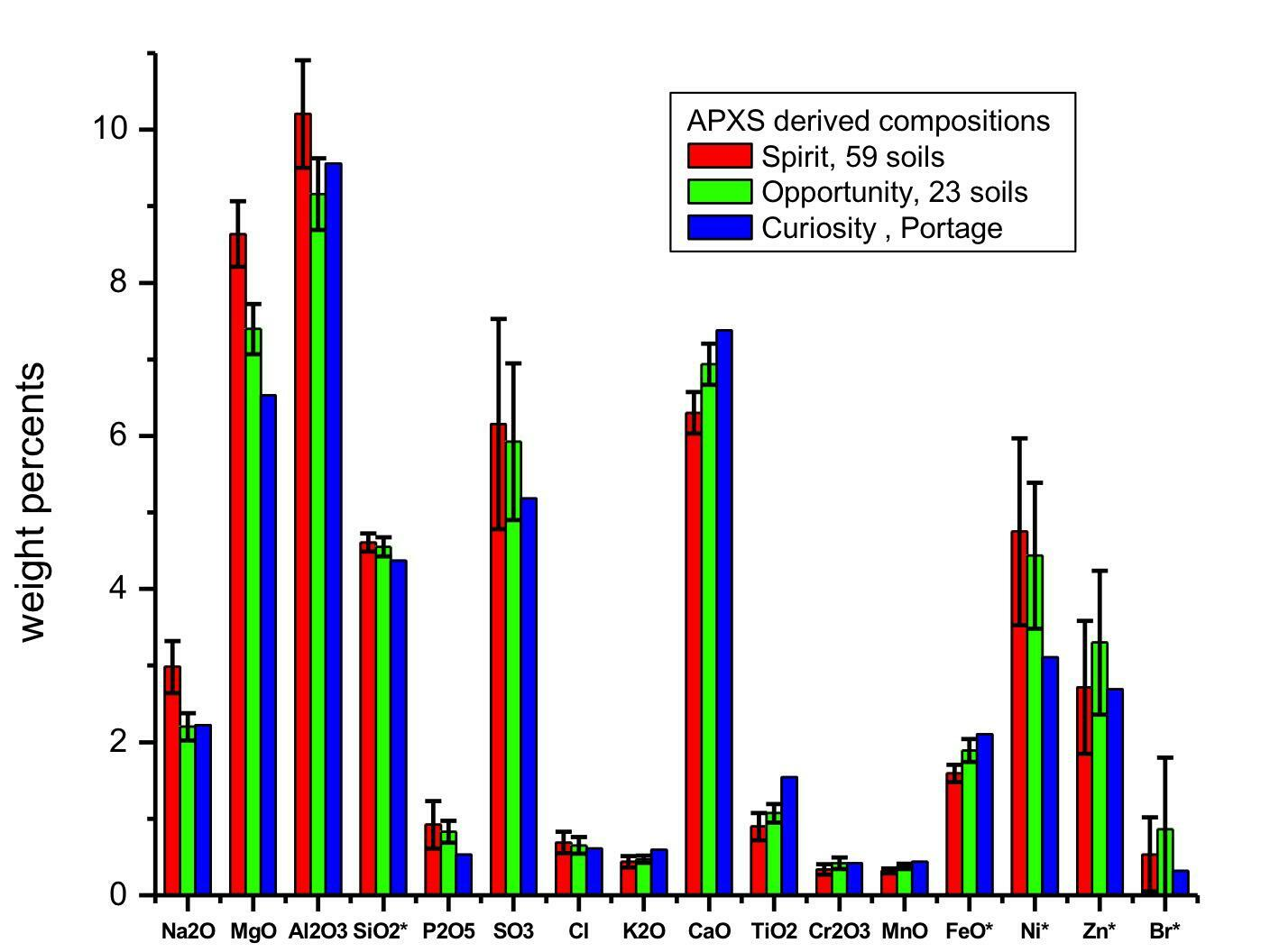
Comparison of Soils on Mars – Samples by Curiosity, Opportunity, and Spirit rovers (December 3, 2012). (SiO_{2} and FeO are divided by 10, and Ni, Zn, and Br are multiplied by 100.)

Mars is covered with vast expanses of sand and dust and its surface is littered with rocks and boulders. The dust is occasionally picked up in vast planet-wide dust storms. Mars dust is very fine, and enough remains suspended in the atmosphere to give the sky a reddish hue. The reddish hue is due to rusting iron minerals presumably formed a few billion years ago when Mars was warm and wet, but now that Mars is cold and dry, modern rusting may be due to a superoxide that forms on minerals exposed to ultraviolet rays in sunlight. The sand is believed to move only slowly in the Martian winds due to the very low density of the atmosphere in the present epoch. In the past, liquid water flowing in gullies and river valleys may have shaped the Martian regolith. Mars researchers are studying whether groundwater sapping is shaping the Martian regolith in the present epoch, and whether carbon dioxide hydrates exist on Mars and play a role.

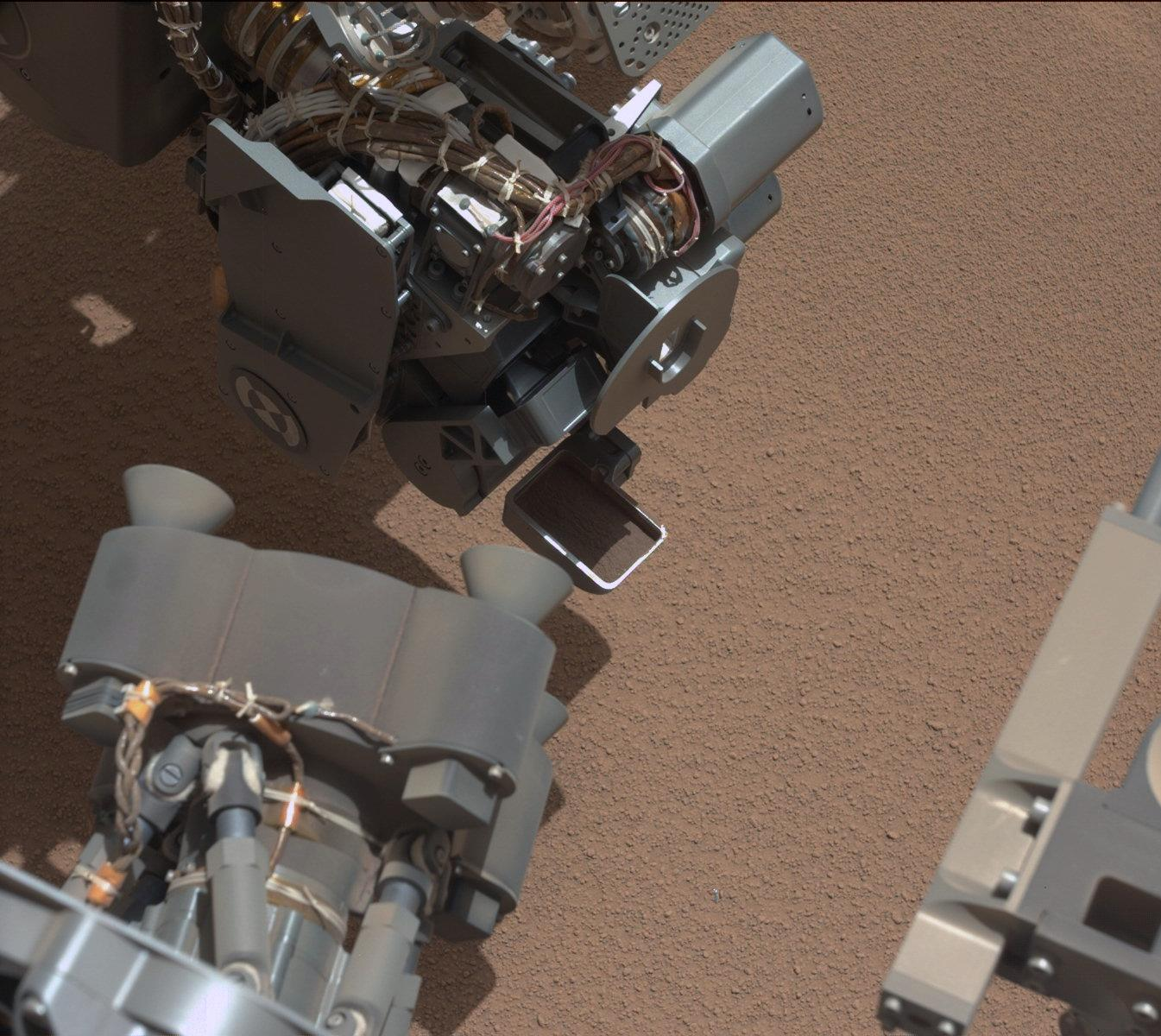
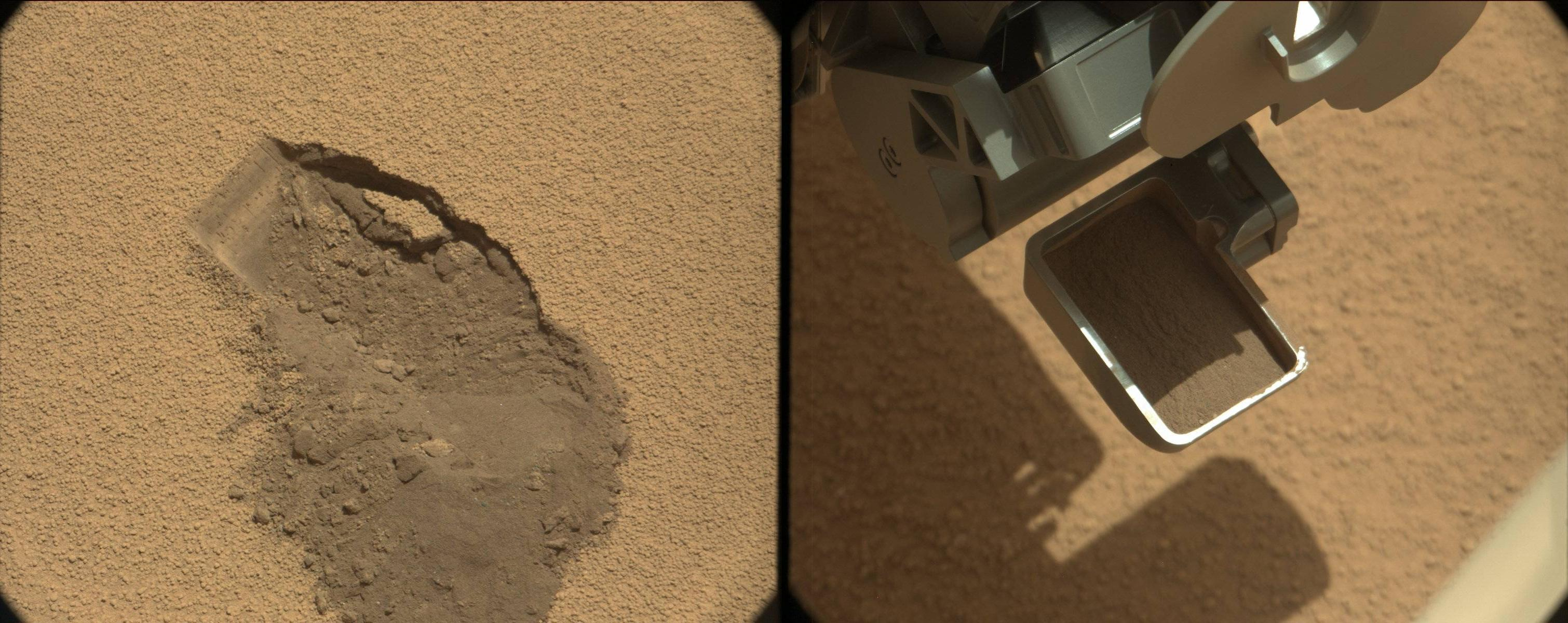
First use of the Curiosity rover's scooper as it sifts a load of sand at "Rocknest" (October 7, 2012)

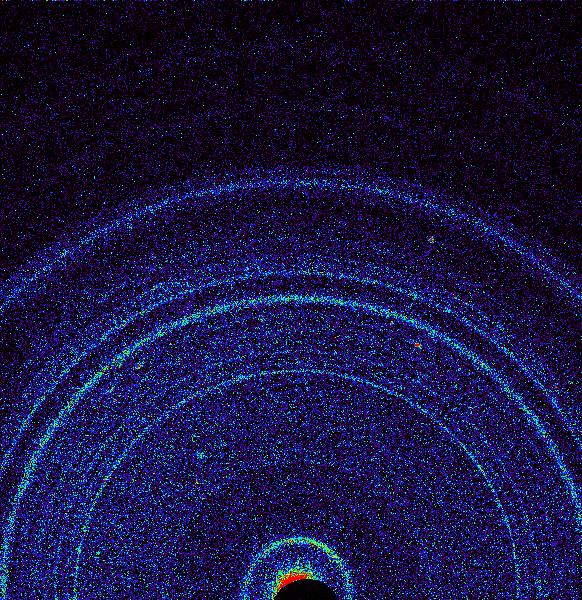
First X-ray diffraction view of Martian soil – CheMin analysis reveals feldspar, pyroxenes, olivine and more (Curiosity rover at "Rocknest", October 17, 2012).

It is believed that large quantities of water and carbon dioxide ices remain frozen within the regolith in the equatorial parts of Mars and on its surface at higher latitudes. According to the High Energy Neutron Detector of the Mars Odyssey satellite the water content of Martian regolith is up to 5% by weight. The presence of olivine, which is an easily weatherable primary mineral, has been interpreted to mean that physical rather than chemical weathering processes currently dominate on Mars. High concentrations of ice in regolith is thought to be the cause of accelerated soil creep, which forms the rounded "softened terrain" characteristic of the Martian midlatitudes.

In June 2008, the Phoenix lander returned data showing Martian regolith to be slightly alkaline and containing vital nutrients such as magnesium, sodium, potassium and chloride, all of which are ingredients for living organisms to grow on Earth. Scientists compared the regolith near Mars's north pole to that of backyard gardens on Earth, and concluded that it could be suitable for growth of plants. However, in August 2008, the Phoenix Lander conducted simple chemistry experiments, mixing water from Earth with Martian soil in an attempt to test its pH, and discovered traces of the salt perchlorate, while also confirming many scientists' hypotheses that the Martian surface was considerably basic, measuring at 8.3. The presence of the perchlorate makes Martian regolith more exotic than previously believed (see Toxicity section). Further testing was necessary to eliminate the possibility of the perchlorate readings being caused by terrestrial sources, which at the time were thought could have migrated from the spacecraft either into samples or the instrumentation. However, each new lander has confirmed their presence in the regolith locally and the Mars Odyssey orbiter confirmed they are spread globally across the entire surface of the planet.

"Sutton Inlier" soil on Mars – target of ChemCam's laser – Curiosity rover (May 11, 2013)

In 1999 the Mars Pathfinder rover performed an indirect electrostatics measurement of the Martian regolith. The Wheel Abrasion Experiment (WAE) was designed with fifteen metal samples and film insulators mounted on the wheel to reflect sunlight to a photovoltaic sensor. Lander cameras showed dust accumulating on the wheels as the rover moved and the WAE detected a drop in the amount of light hitting the sensor. It is believed that the dust may have acquired an electrostatic charge as the wheels rolled across the surface causing the dust to adhere to the film surface.

On October 17, 2012 (Curiosity rover at "Rocknest"), the first X-ray diffraction analysis of Martian regolith was performed. The results revealed the presence of several minerals, including feldspar, pyroxenes and olivine, and suggested that the Martian regolith in the sample was similar to the "weathered basaltic soils" of Hawaiian volcanoes. Hawaiian volcanic ash has been used as Martian regolith simulant by researchers since 1998.

In December 2012, scientists working on the Mars Science Laboratory mission announced that an extensive analysis of Martian regolith performed by the Curiosity rover showed evidence of water molecules, sulphur and chlorine, as well as hints of organic compounds. However, terrestrial contamination, as the source of the organic compounds, could not be ruled out.

On September 26, 2013, NASA scientists reported the Mars Curiosity rover detected "abundant, easily accessible" water (1.5 to 3 weight percent) in regolith samples at the Rocknest region of Aeolis Palus in Gale Crater. In addition, NASA reported that the Curiosity rover found two principal regolith types: a fine-grained mafic type and a locally derived, coarse-grained felsic type. The mafic type, similar to other Martian regolith and Martian dust, was associated with hydration of the amorphous phases of the regolith. Also, perchlorates, the presence of which may make detection of life-related organic molecules difficult, were found at the Curiosity rover landing site (and earlier at the more polar site of the Phoenix lander) suggesting a "global distribution of these salts". NASA also reported that Jake M rock, a rock encountered by Curiosity on the way to Glenelg, was a mugearite and very similar to terrestrial mugearite rocks.

On April 11, 2019, NASA announced that the Curiosity rover on Mars drilled into, and closely studied, a "clay-bearing unit" which, according to the rover Project Manager, is a "major milestone" in Curiosity's journey up Mount Sharp.

Humans will need in situ resources for colonising Mars. That demands an understanding of the local unconsolidated bulk sediment, but the classification of such sediment remains a work in progress. Too little of the entire Martian surface is known to draw a sufficiently representative picture.

== Atmospheric dust ==
Similarly sized dust will settle from the thinner Martian atmosphere sooner than it would on Earth. For example, the dust suspended by the 2001 global dust storms on Mars only remained in the Martian atmosphere for 0.6 years, while the dust from Mount Pinatubo took about two years to settle. However, under current Martian conditions, the mass movements involved are generally much smaller than on Earth. Even the 2001 global dust storms on Mars moved only the equivalent of a very thin dust layer – about 3 μm thick if deposited with uniform thickness between 58° north and south of the equator. Dust deposition at the two rover sites has proceeded at a rate of about the thickness of a grain every 100 sols.

The difference in the concentration of dust in Earth's atmosphere and that of Mars stems from a key factor. On Earth, dust that leaves atmospheric suspension usually gets aggregated into larger particles through the action of soil moisture or gets suspended in oceanic waters. It helps that most of Earth's surface is covered by liquid water. Neither process occurs on Mars, leaving deposited dust available for suspension back into the Martian atmosphere. In fact, the composition of Martian atmospheric dust – very similar to surface dust – as observed by the Mars Global Surveyor Thermal Emission Spectrometer, may be volumetrically dominated by composites of plagioclase feldspar and zeolite which can be mechanically derived from Martian basaltic rocks without chemical alteration. Observations of the Mars Exploration Rovers' magnetic dust traps suggest that about 45% of the elemental iron in atmospheric dust is maximally oxidized (Fe^{3+}) and that nearly half exists in titanomagnetite, both consistent with mechanical derivation of dust with aqueous alteration limited to just thin films of water. Collectively, these observations support the absence of water-driven dust aggregation processes on Mars. Furthermore, wind activity dominates the surface of Mars at present, and the abundant dune fields of Mars can easily yield particles into atmospheric suspension through effects such as larger grains disaggregating fine particles through collisions.

The Martian atmospheric dust particles are generally 3 μm in diameter. While the atmosphere of Mars is thinner, Mars also has a lower gravitational acceleration, so the size of particles that will remain in suspension cannot be estimated with atmospheric thickness alone. Electrostatic and van der Waals forces acting among fine particles introduce additional complexities to calculations. Rigorous modeling of all relevant variables suggests that 3 μm diameter particles can remain in suspension indefinitely at most wind speeds, while particles as large as 20 μm diameter can enter suspension from rest at surface wind turbulence as low as 2 ms^{−1} or remain in suspension at 0.8 ms^{−1}.

In July 2018, researchers reported that the largest single source of dust on the planet Mars comes from the Medusae Fossae Formation.

Dust devils

Dust devil on Mars as viewed by the Curiosity rover

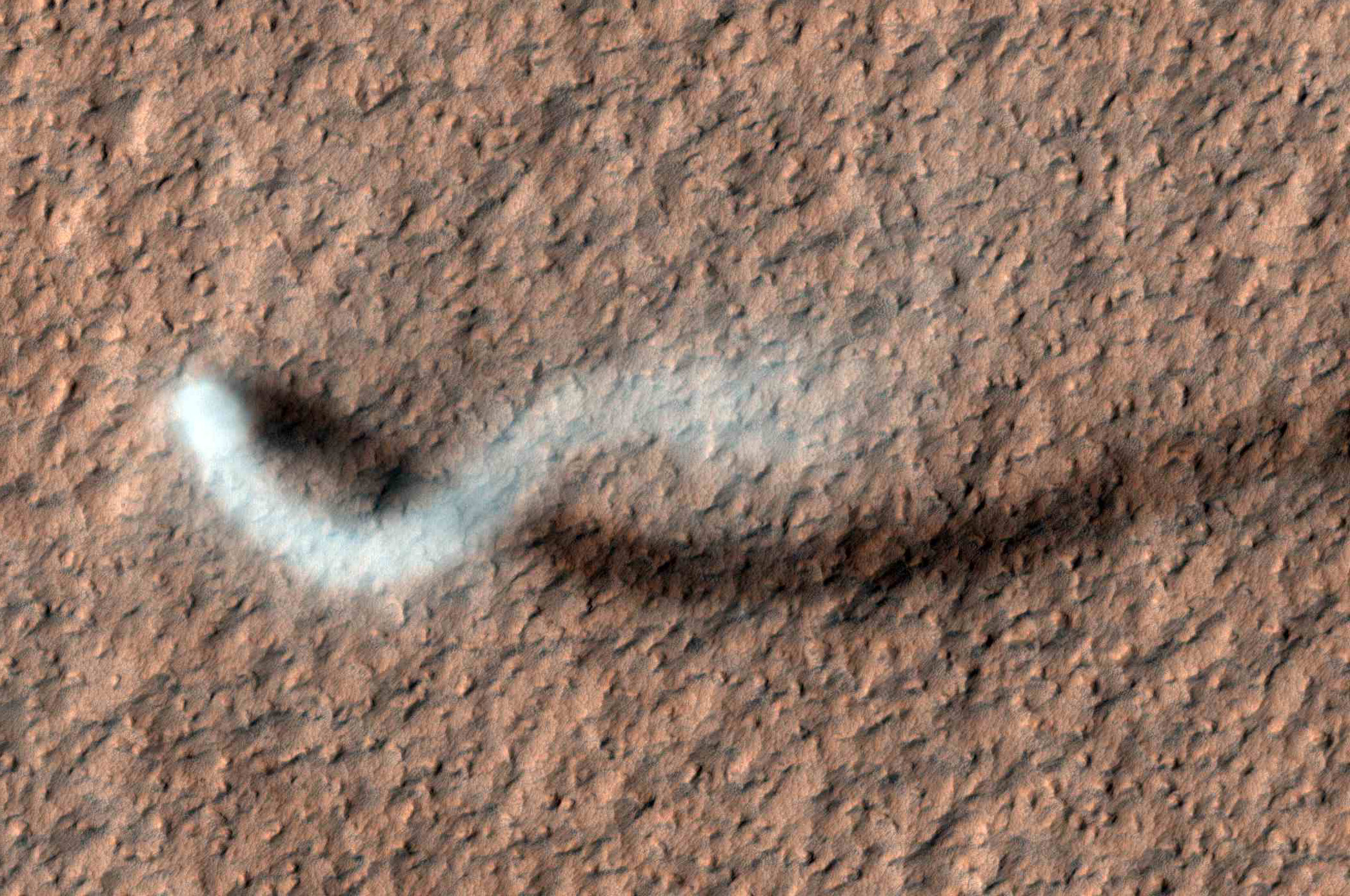
A 30 meter wide and 800 meter high dust devil. Dust devils of 20 kilometer height have been observed.

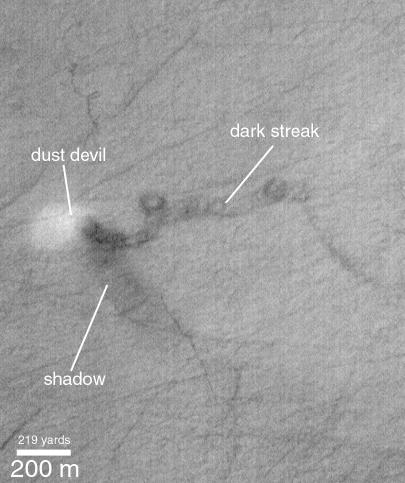

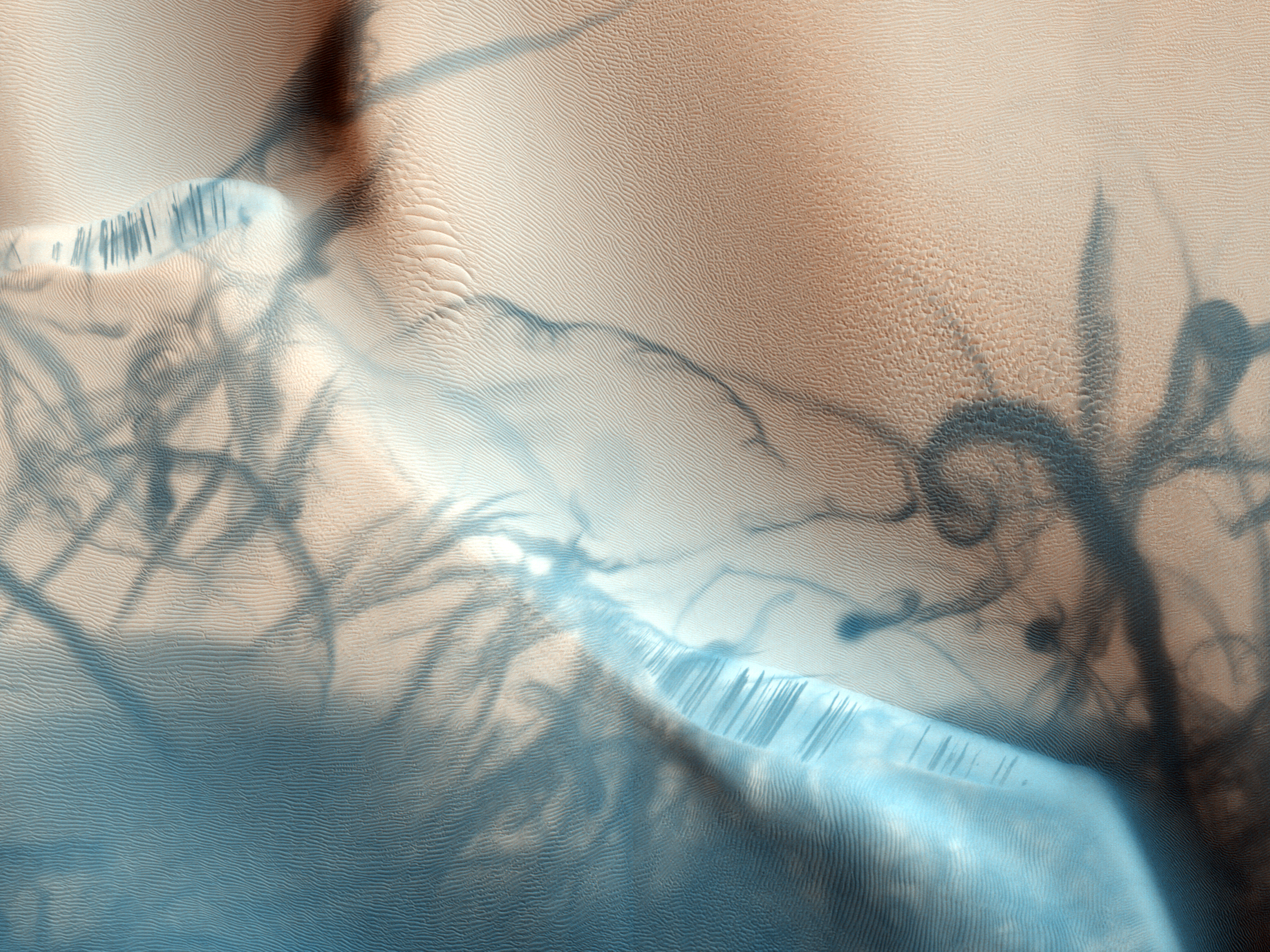
Dust devils cause twisting dark trails on the Martian surface

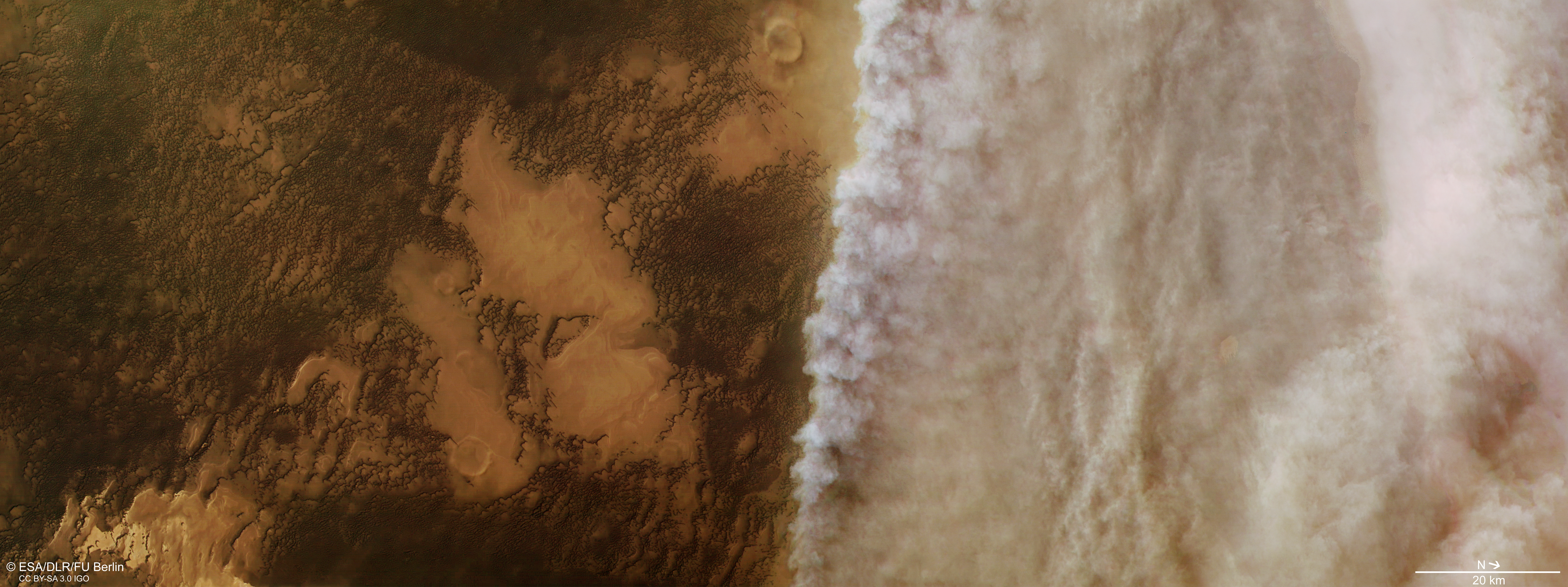
Detail of a Martian dust storm, as viewed from orbit

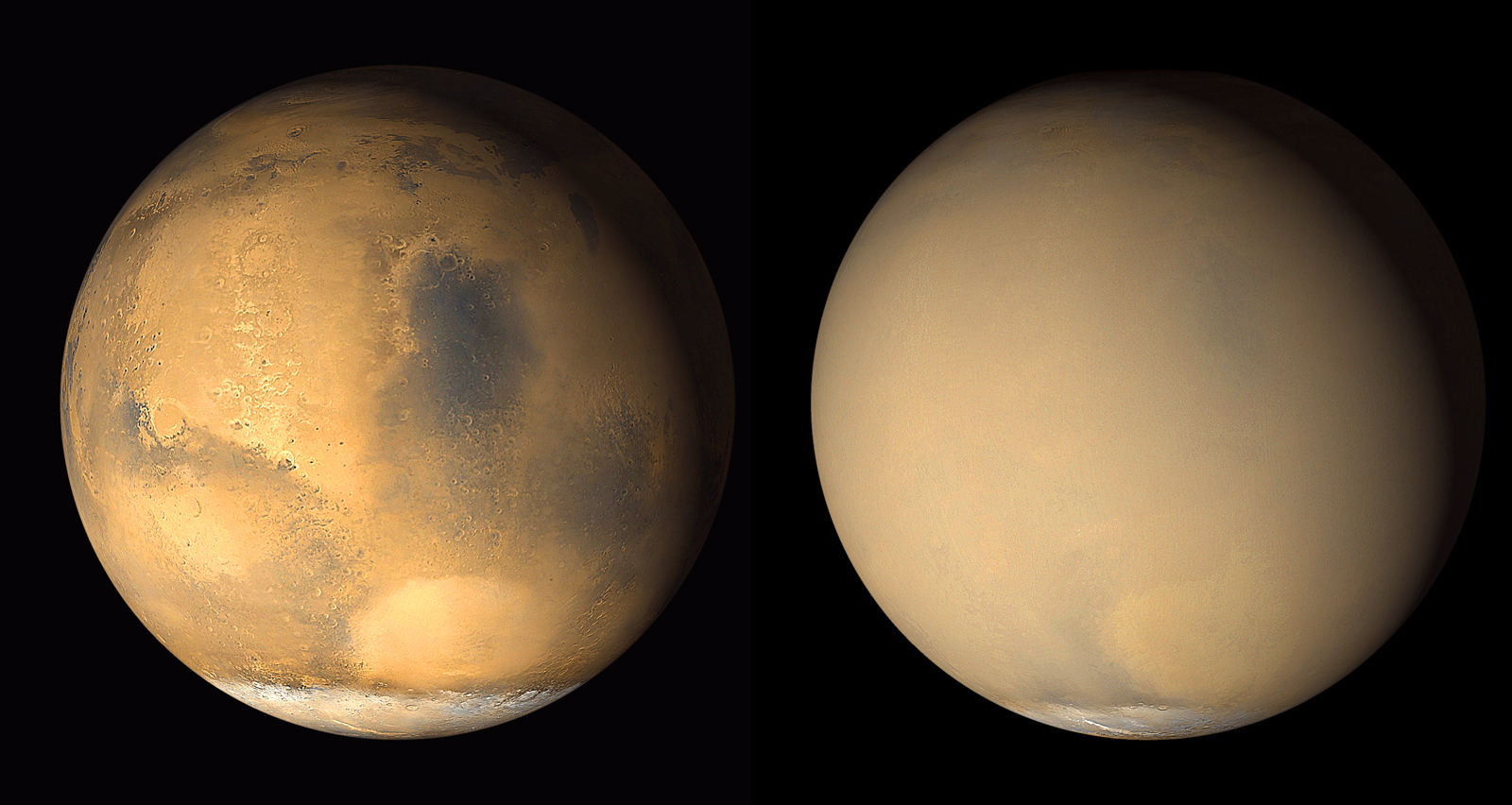
Mars without a dust storm in June 2001 (on left) and with a global dust storm in July 2001 (on right), as seen by Mars Global Surveyor

Mars dust storm in optical depth tau from May to September 2018 (by Mars Climate Sounder)

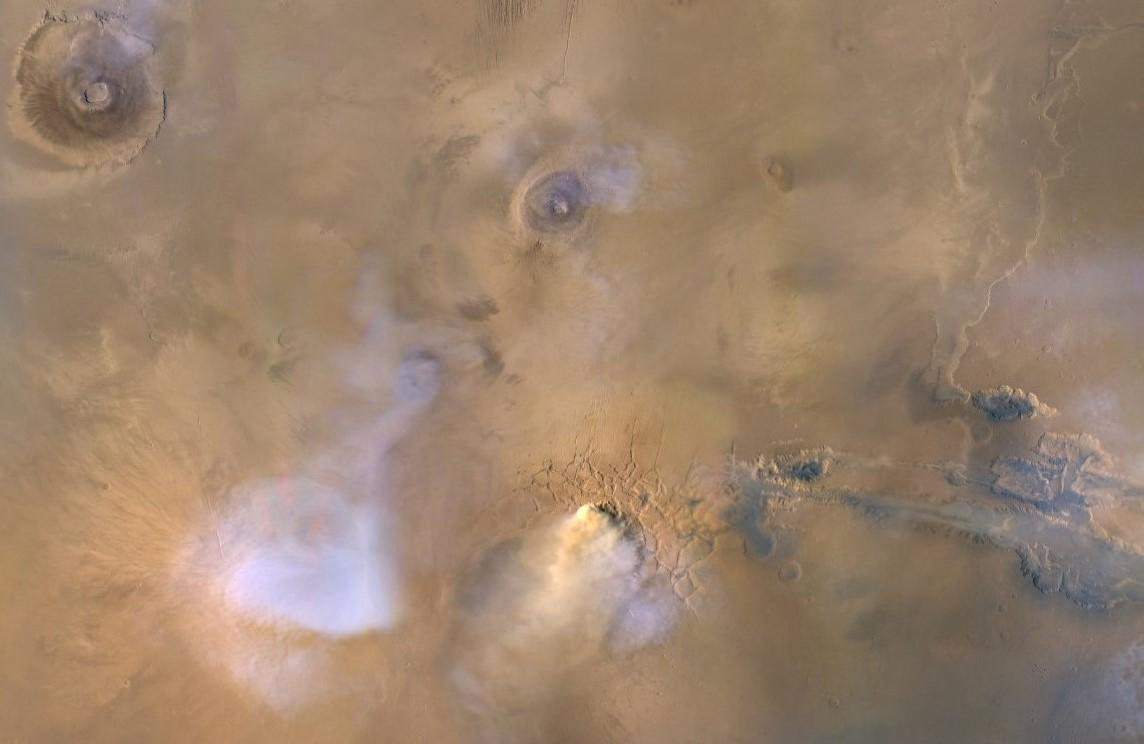
Difference of dust and water clouds: the yellow cloud at the bottom center of the image is a large dust cloud, the other white clouds are water clouds.

== Research on Earth ==
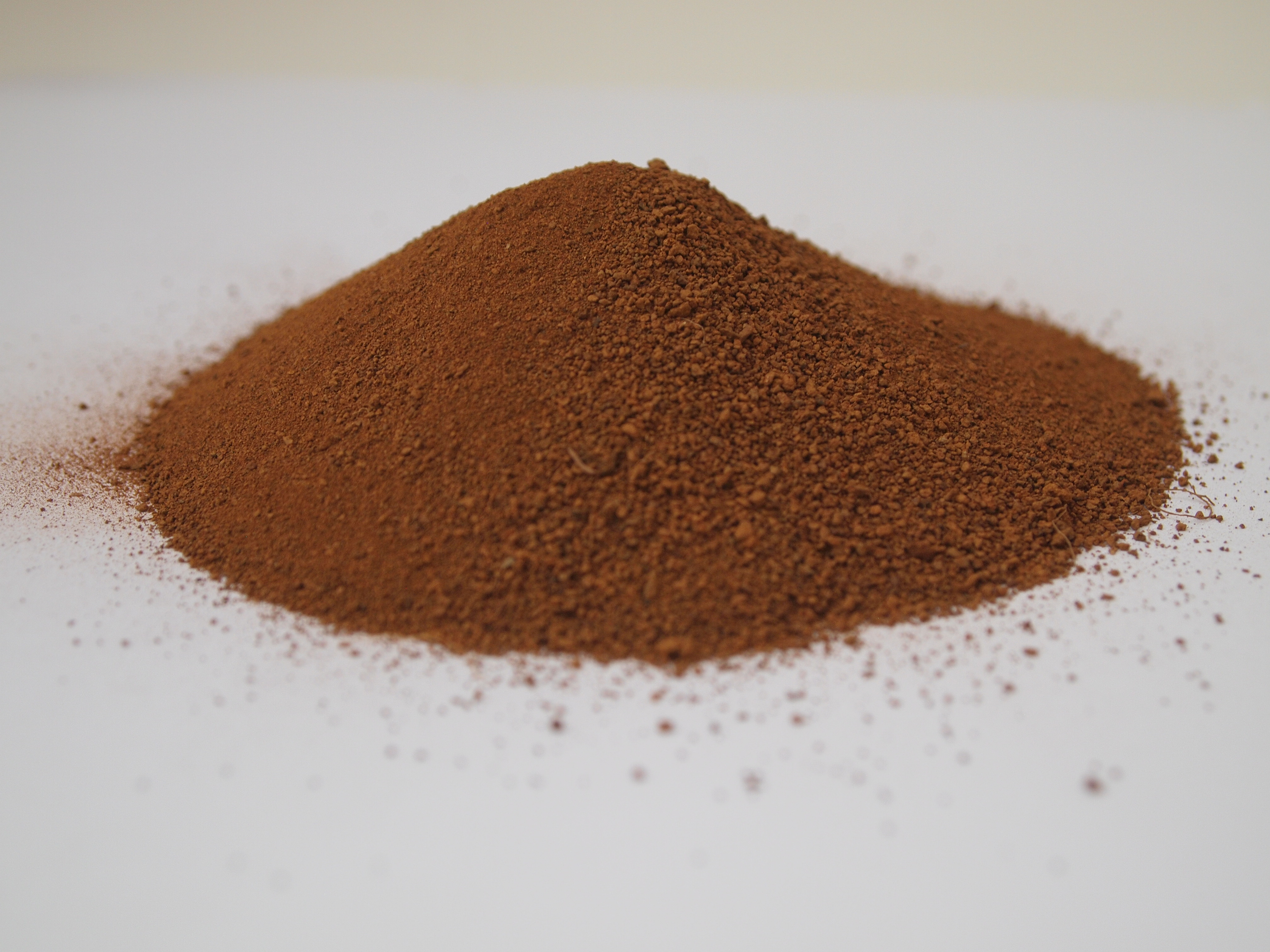
A small pile of JSC MARS-1A soil simulant

Research on Earth is currently limited to using Martian regolith simulants, such as the MGS-1 simulant produced by Exolith Lab, which are based on the analysis from the various Mars spacecraft. These are a terrestrial material that is used to simulate the chemical and mechanical properties of Martian regolith for research, experiments and prototype testing of activities related to Martian regolith such as dust mitigation of transportation equipment, advanced life support systems and in-situ resource utilization.

A number of Mars sample return missions are being planned, which would allow actual Martian regolith to be returned to Earth for more advanced analysis than is possible in situ on the surface of Mars. This should allow even more accurate simulants. The first of these missions is a multi-part mission beginning with the Mars 2020 lander. This will collect samples over a long period. A second lander will then gather the samples and return them to Earth.

== Gallery ==
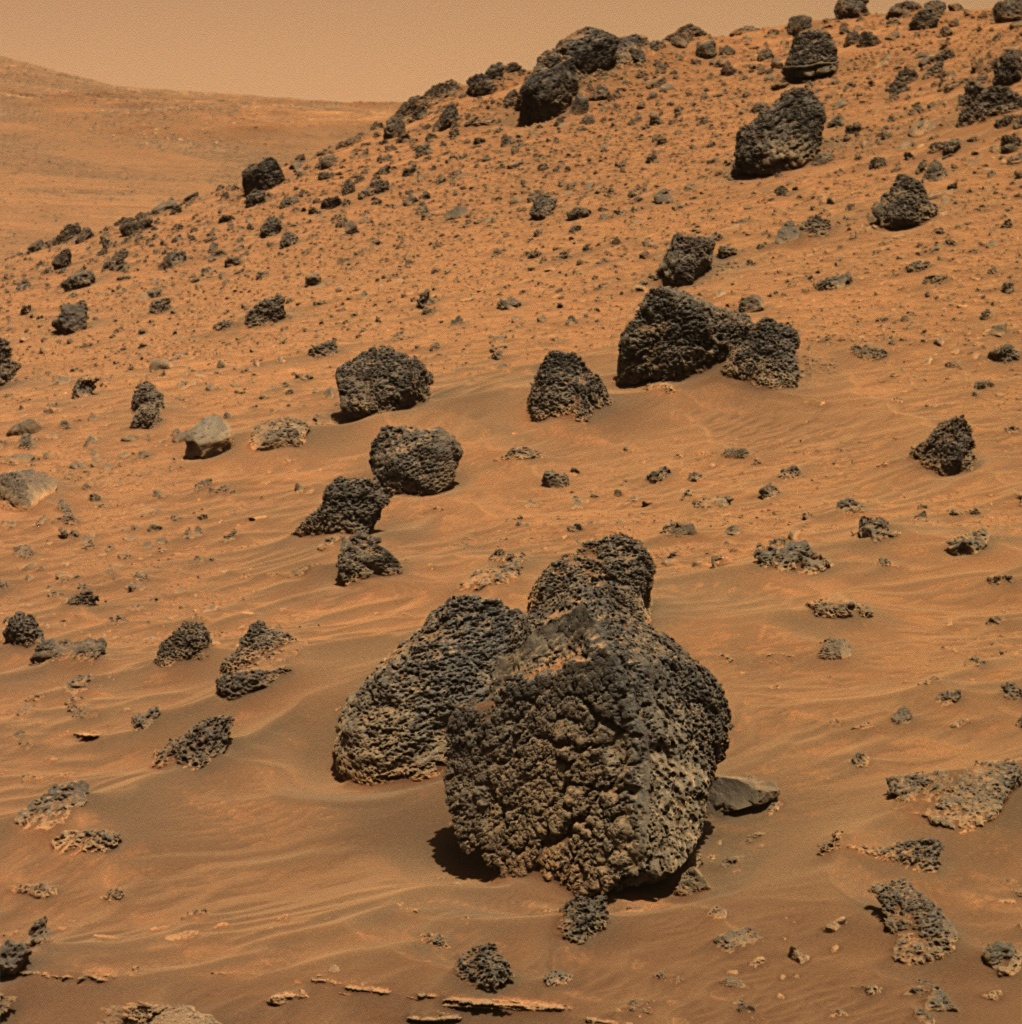
Martian sand and boulders photographed by NASA's Mars Exploration Rover Spirit (April 13, 2006)

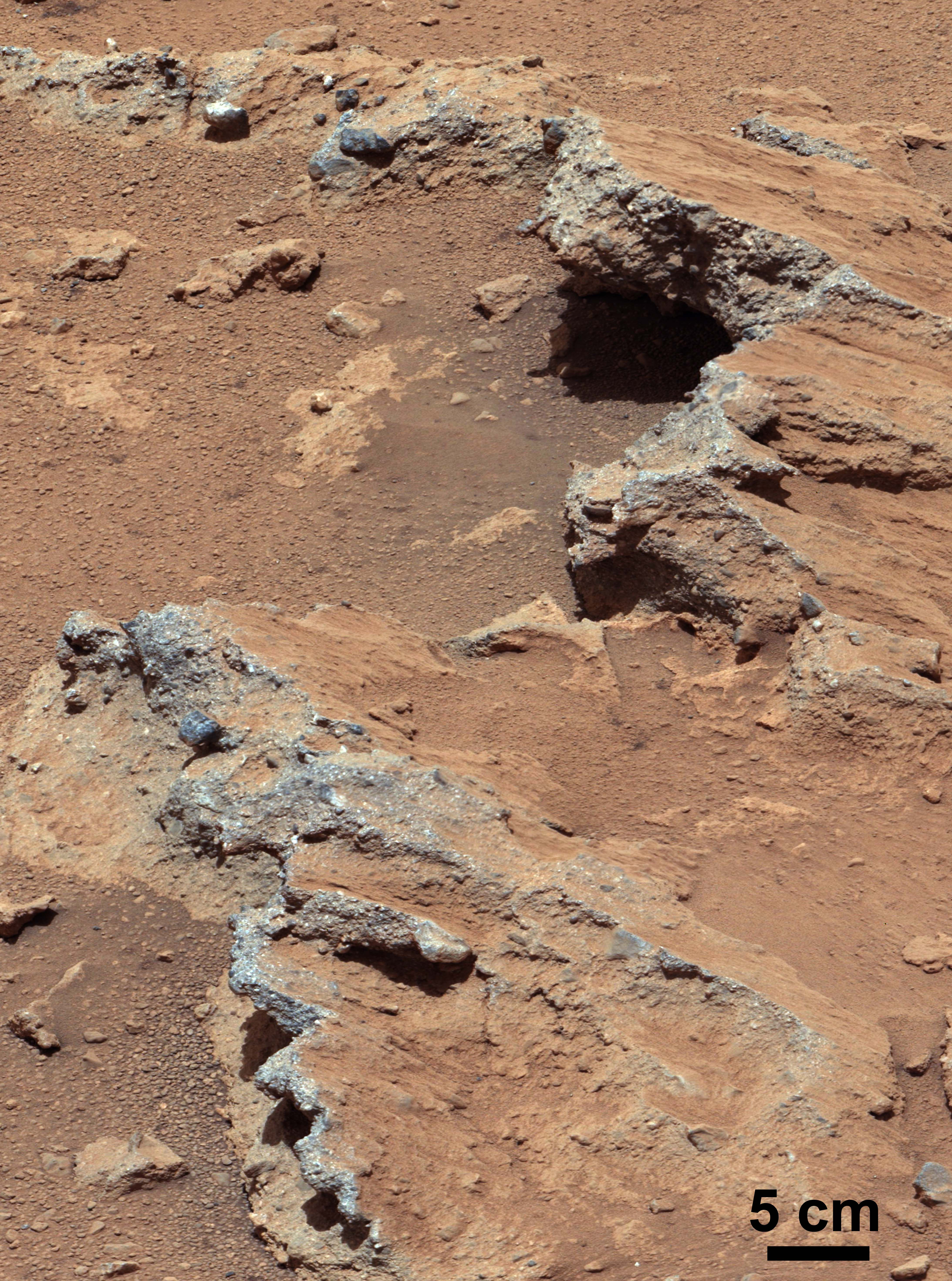
"Hottah" rock outcrop (close-up; 3D) (September 12, 2012)

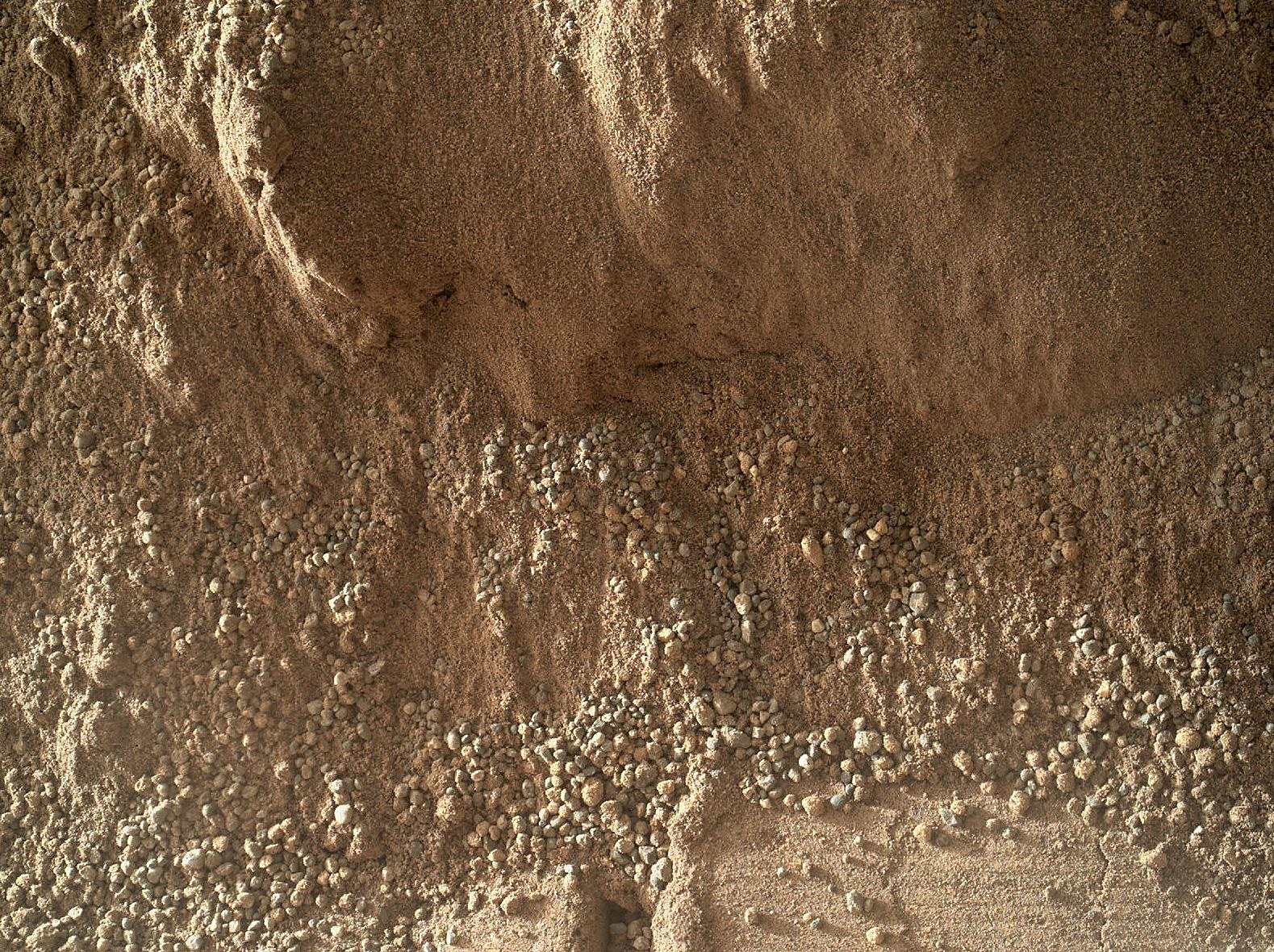
"Rocknest" sand on Mars – scoffmark made by the Curiosity rover (MAHLI, October 4, 2012)

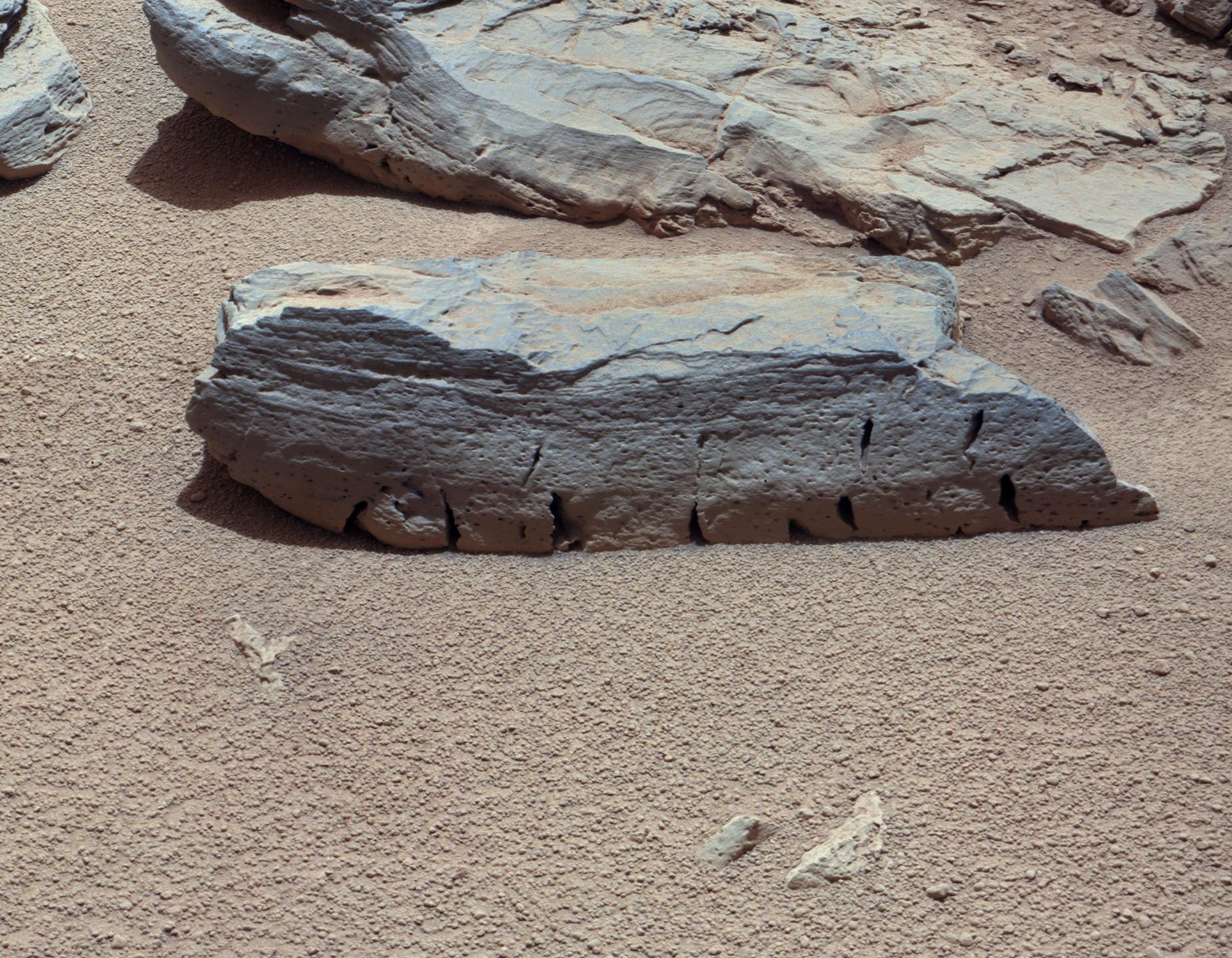
"Rocknest 3" rock on Mars – as viewed by the MastCam on Curiosity (October 5, 2012)

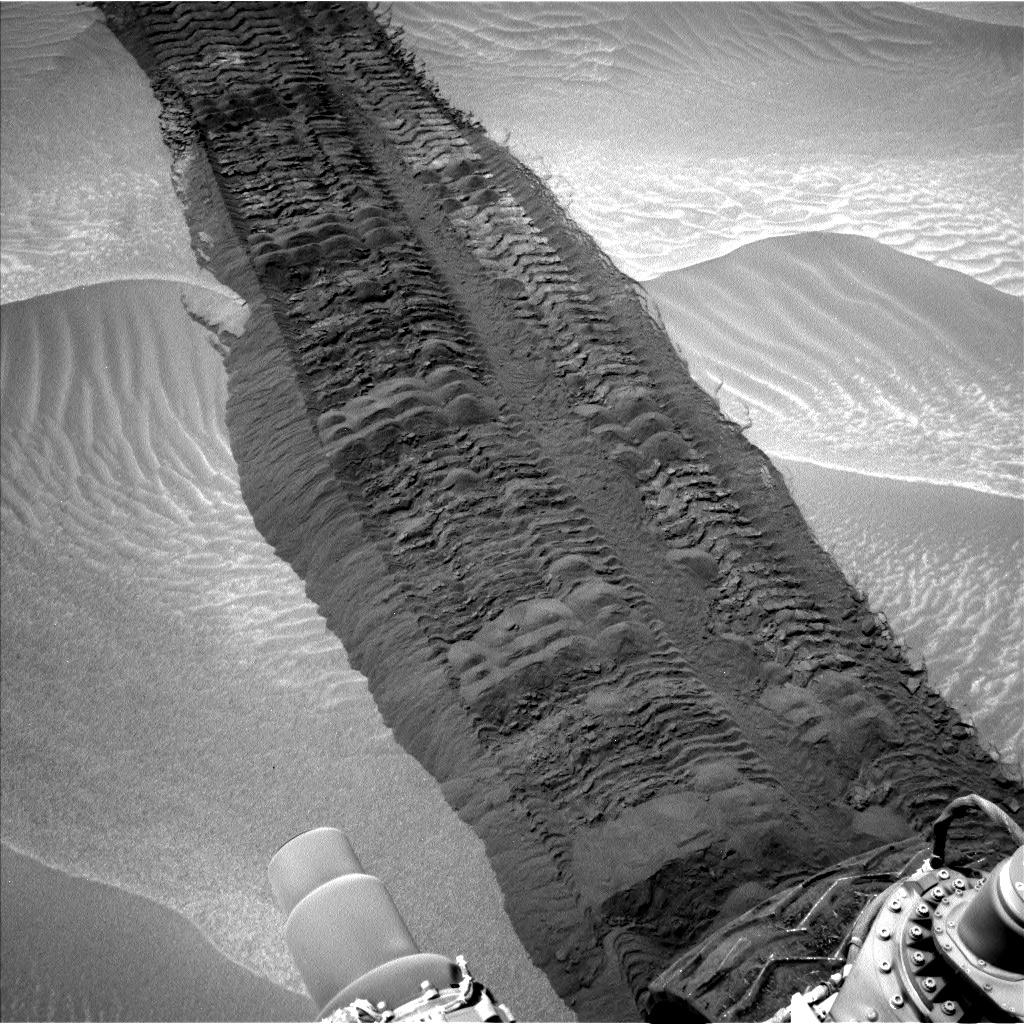
Tracks of the Curiosity rover in the sands of "Hidden Valley" (August 4, 2014)

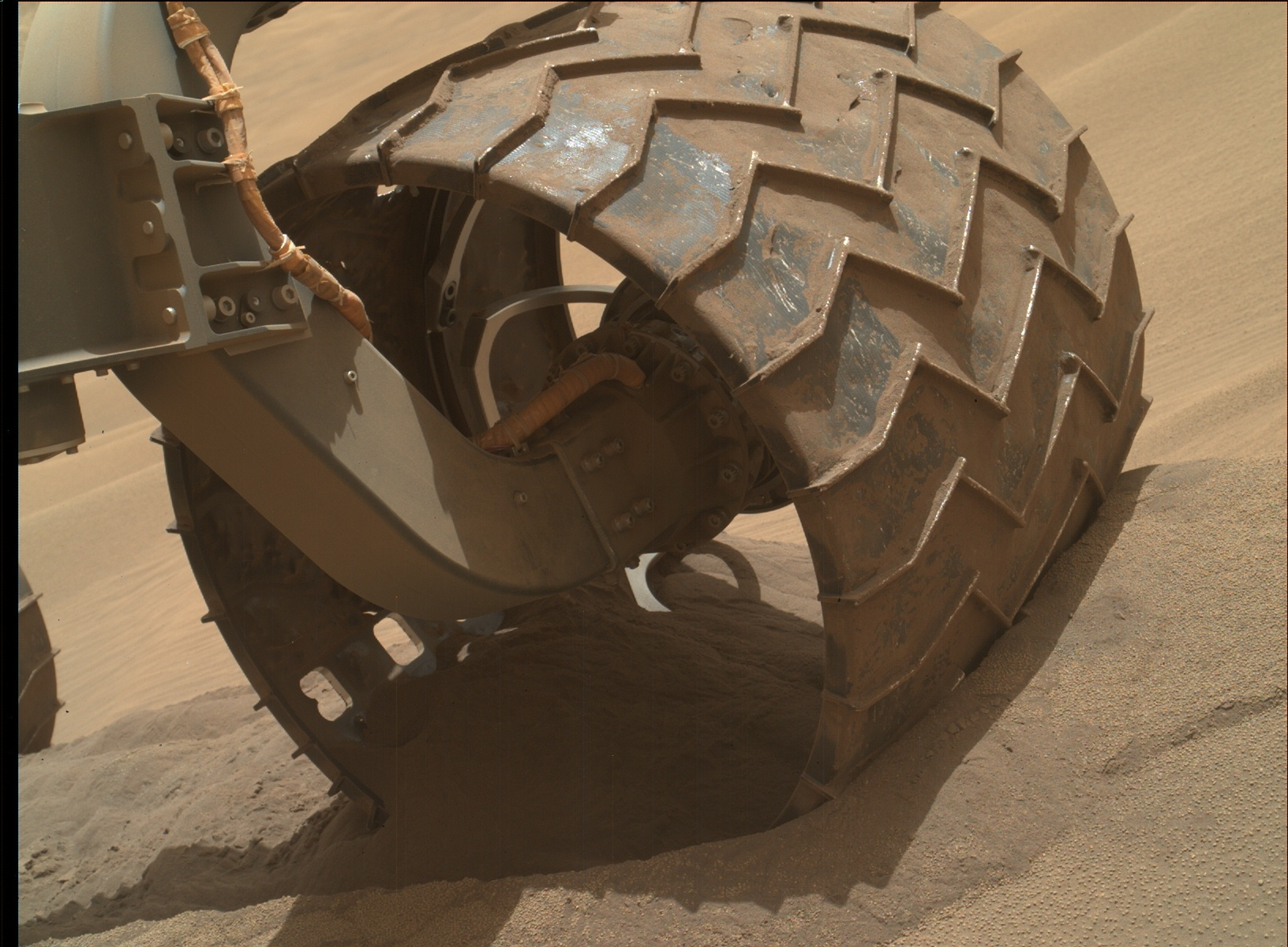
Wheel of the Curiosity rover partially submerged in sand at Hidden Valley (August 6, 2014)
Sand moving on Mars – as viewed by Curiosity (January 23, 2017)

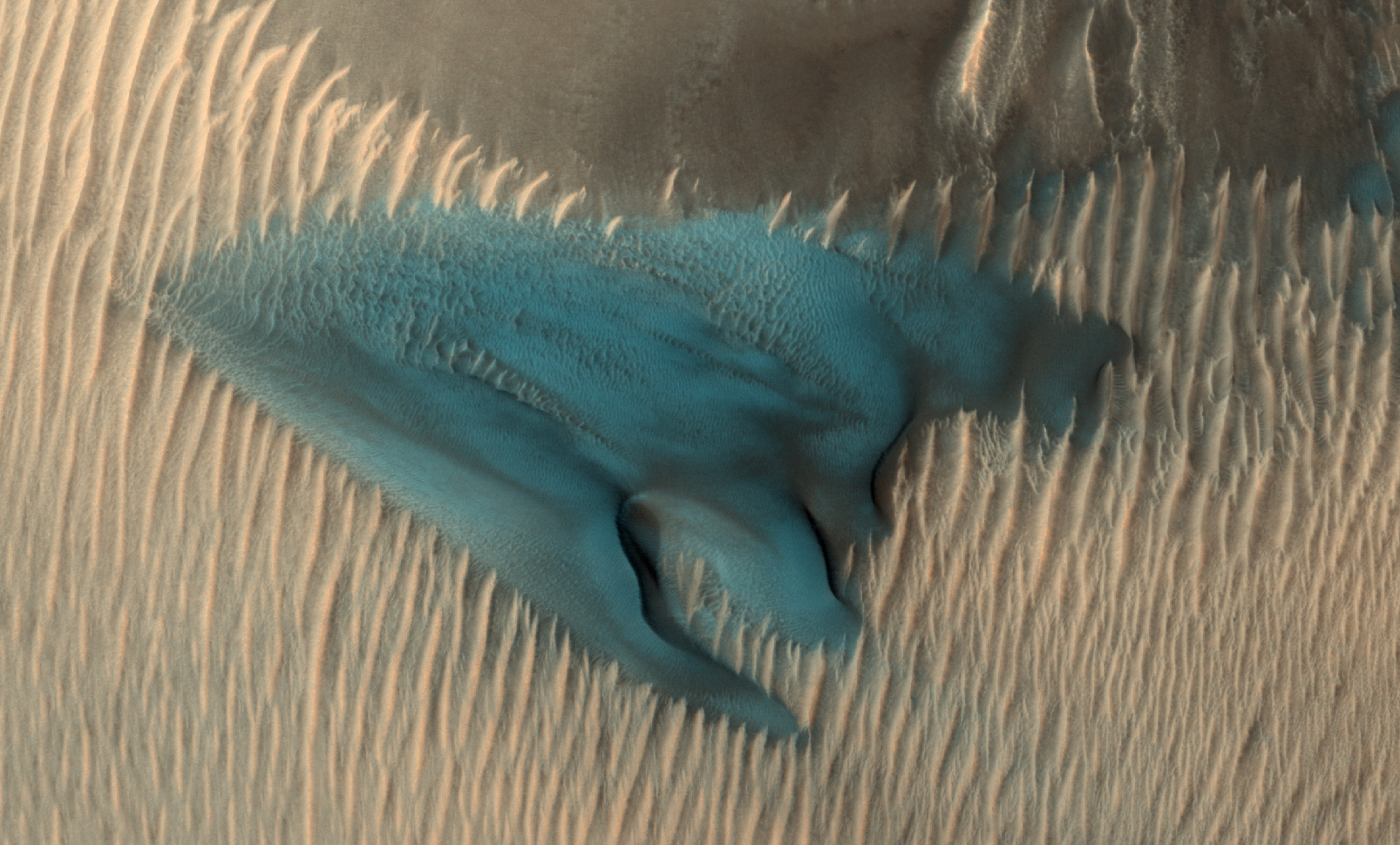
A dune on Mars appears in false colors blue. In false colour colours yellow to blue represent warmer to colder regolith.

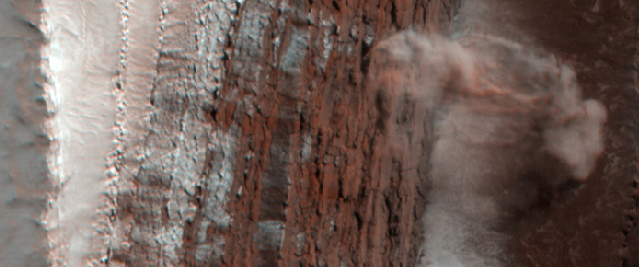
An avalanche of dust

== See also ==
- Martian soil simulant
- Aeolis quadrangle
- Carbonates on Mars
- Composition of Mars
- Gale Crater
- Geology of Mars
- List of rocks on Mars
- Martian regolith simulant
- Mineralogy of Mars
- Scientific information from the Mars Exploration Rover mission
- Water on Mars
- Mars carbonate catastrophe
