= Martian regolith simulant =

Material used to simulate the properties of Martian regolith

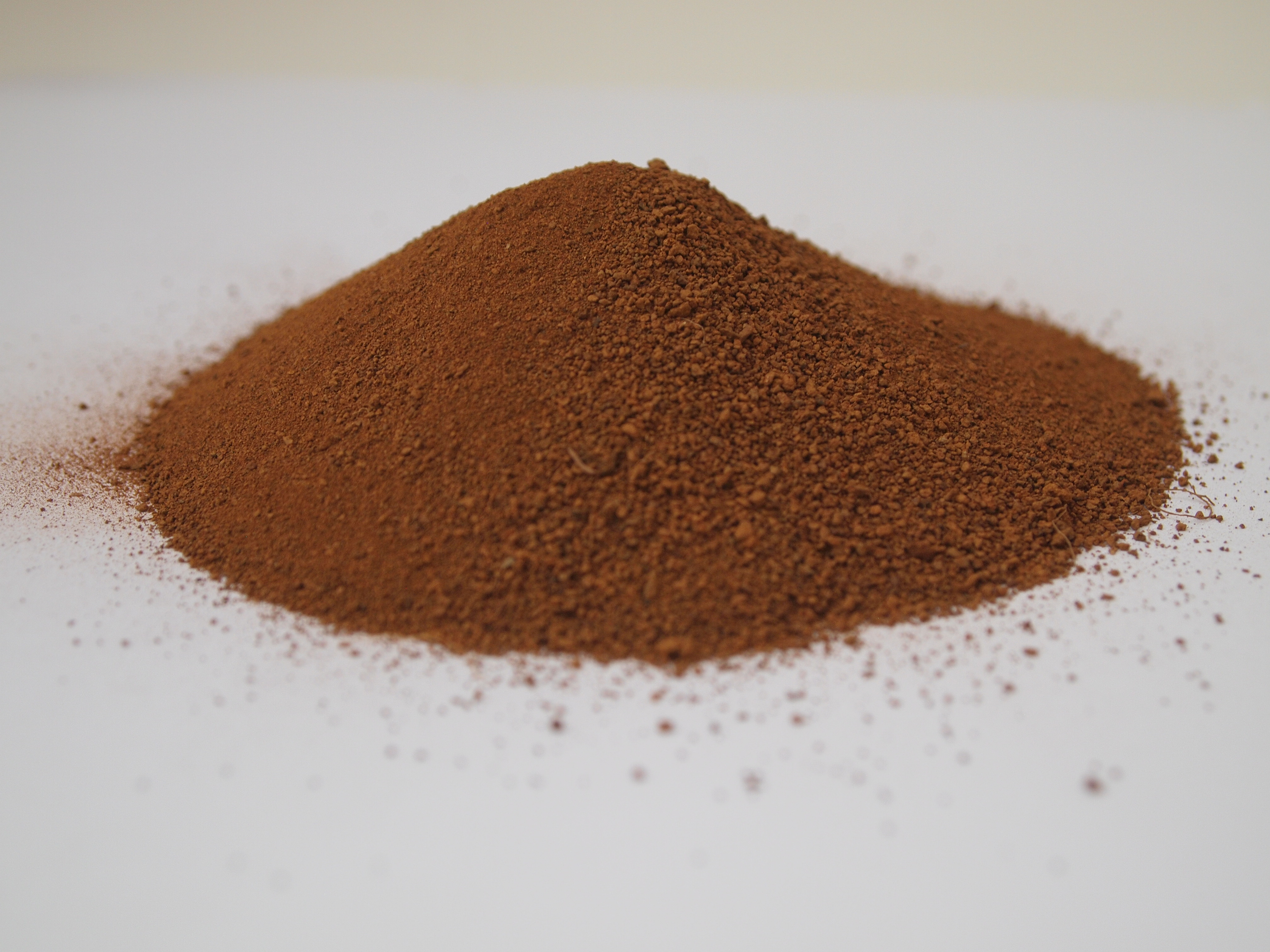
A small pile of JSC MARS-1A

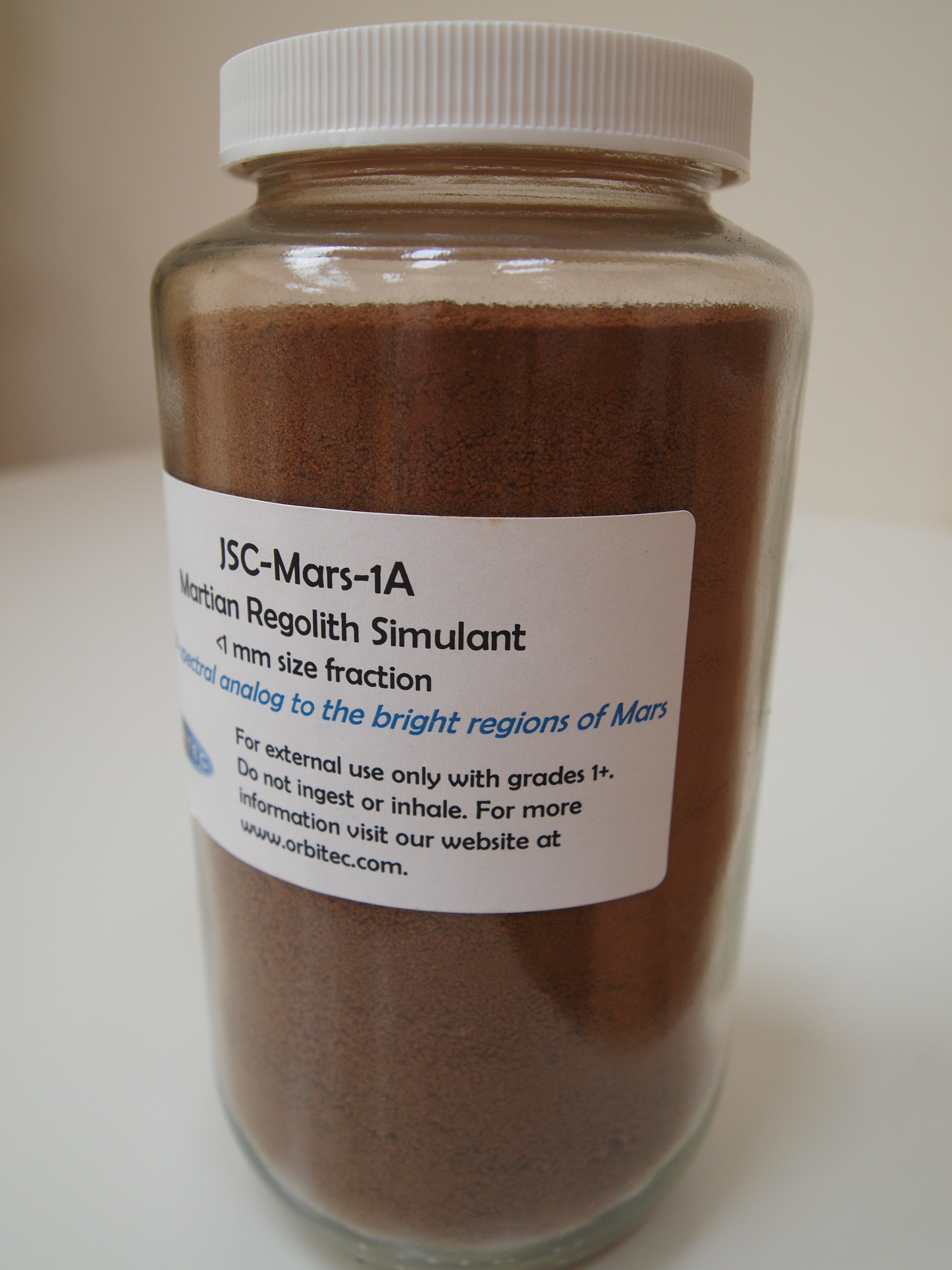
A jar of Martian regolith simulant JSC MARS-1A

Martian regolith simulant (or Martian soil simulant) is a terrestrial material that is used to simulate the chemical and mechanical properties of Martian regolith for research, experiments and prototype testing of activities related to Martian regolith such as dust mitigation of transportation equipment, advanced life support systems and in-situ resource utilization.

== Variations ==
=== JSC Mars-1 and JSC Mars-1A ===
After the Viking landers and the Mars Pathfinder's rover landed on Mars, the onboard instruments were used to determine the properties of the Martian soil at the landing sites. The studies of the Martian soil properties led to the development of JSC Mars-1 Martian regolith simulant at NASA's Johnson Space Center in 1998. It contained palagonitic tephra with a particle size fraction of less than 1 millimeter. The palagonitic tephra, which is glassy volcanic ash altered at low temperature, was mined from a quarry at the Pu'u Nene cinder cone. The studies of the cone, which is located between Mauna Loa and Mauna Kea in Hawaii, indicate that the tephra is a close spectral analog to the bright regions of Mars.

When the original supply of JSC Mars-1 ran out, there were needs for additional material. NASA's Marshall Space Flight Center contracted Orbital Technologies Corporation to supply 16 metric tons of lunar and Martian simulants. The company also made an additional eight tons of Martian simulant available for other interested parties to purchase. However, as of 2017 JSC Mars-1A is no longer available.

After milling to reduce its particle size, JSC Mars-1A can geopolymerize in alkaline solutions forming a solid material. Tests show that the maximum compressive and flexural strength of the 'martian' geopolymer is comparable to that of common clay bricks.

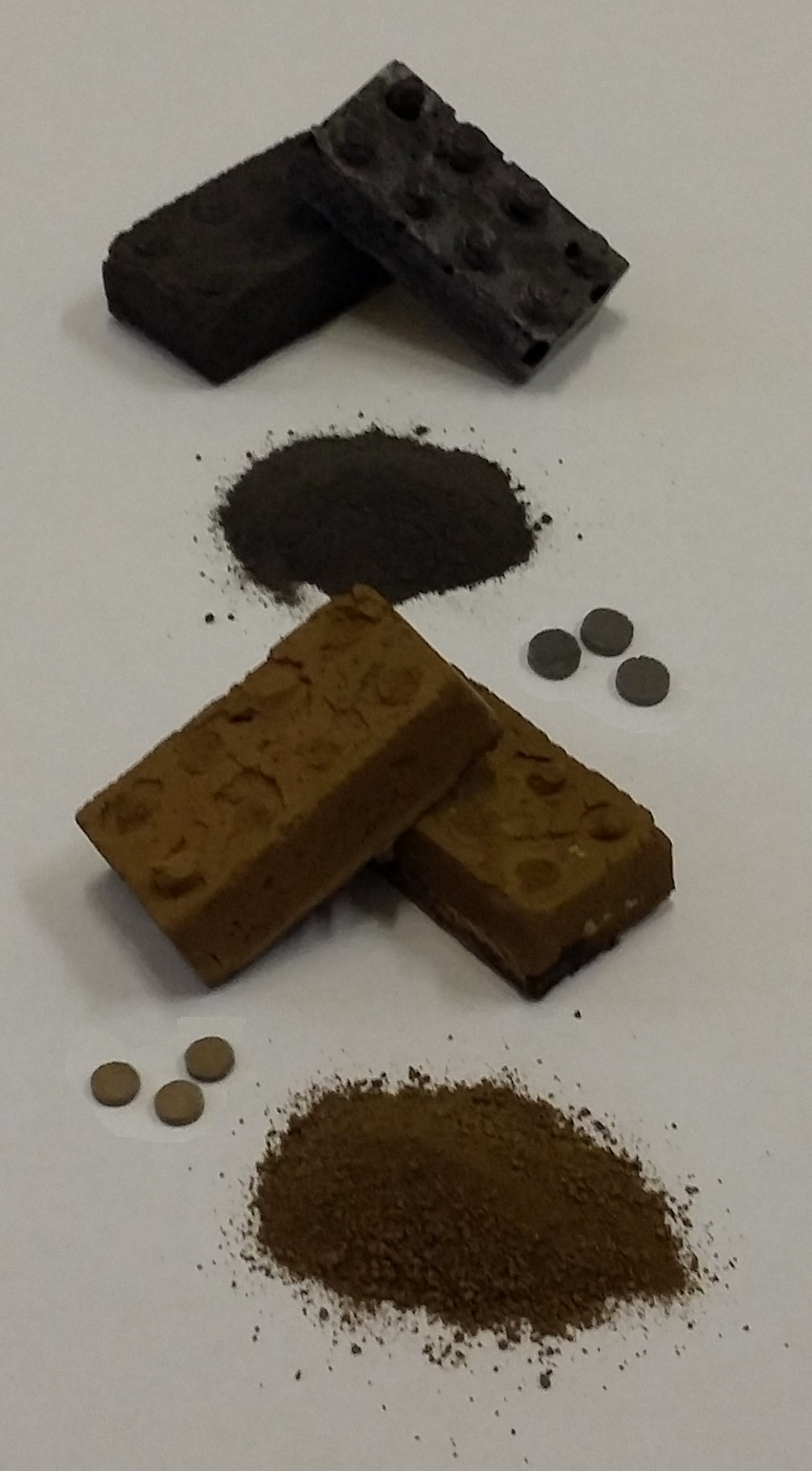
Geopolymers from lunar (JSC-1A) and Martian (JSC MARS-1A) dust simulants produced at the University of Birmingham

=== MMS ===
MMS or Mojave Mars Simulant was developed in 2007 to address some issues with JSC Mars-1. While JSC Mars-1 did simulate the color of Martian regolith, it performed poorly in many qualities, including its hygroscopic tendencies—it had undergone weathering that attracts water, making it more clay-like. MMS, however, was hygroscopically inert due to minimal weathering and the way it was crushed, which allowed it to better simulate that feature of Martian regolith, among others. MMS was found naturally as whole rocks in a volcanic formation near the town of Boron, California, in the western Mojave Desert. After crushing, basalt sands were processed and graded into particular sizes, MMS Coarse and MMS Fine. MMS Dust consists of smaller basalt particles matching the particle size distribution of Martian dust. A separate volcanic event created red-colored cinder which is mined and crushed to create MMS Cinder.

=== MGS-1 ===
MGS-1 or Mars Global Simulant was developed starting in 2018 as the first mineralogically accurate Martian regolith simulant. It is based on the Rocknest soil in Gale crater on Mars that has been analyzed extensively by the NASA Curiosity rover. MGS-1 is produced by mixing pure minerals together in accurate proportions, with a realistic particle size distribution. The simulant is available from the not-for-profit Exolith Lab at the University of Central Florida. MGS-1 does not include perchlorates by default, so it cannot be used to test the effects of that aspect of the Martian regolith. However, end users can spike the material with perchlorate salts or other superoxide species.

== Health risks ==
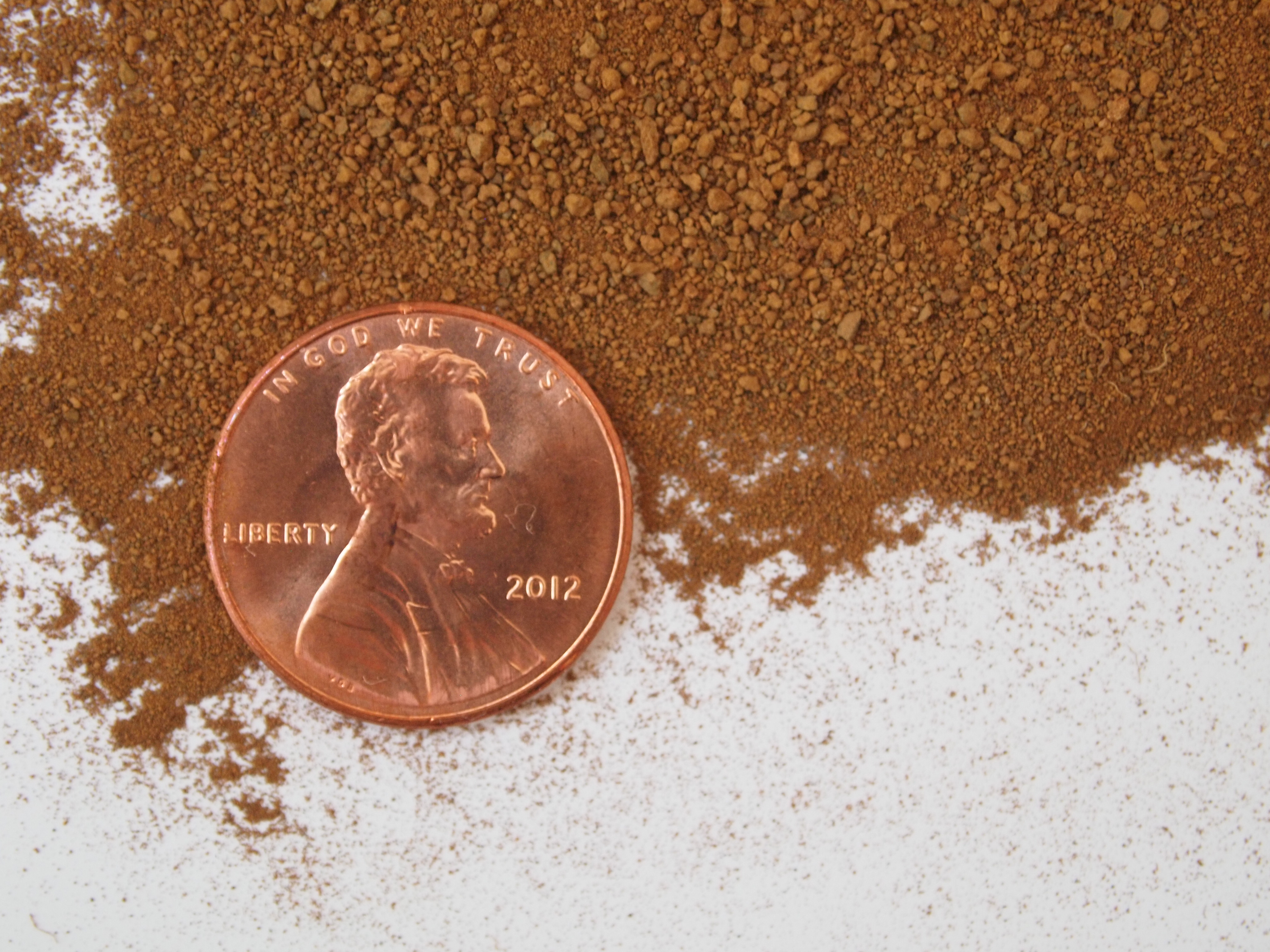
Particle size of Martian regolith simulant JSC MARS-1A compared to one US cent

Exposure to regolith simulants may pose some health risks due to the fine particles and the presence of crystalline silica. JSC Mars-1A has slight hazard on inhalation and eye contact which may cause irritation to eyes and respiratory tract. There has been research into the toxicity of the simulants to the body cells. JSC MARS-1 is considered to have dose-dependent cytotoxicity. Therefore, it is recommended for precautions to minimize fine dust exposure in large-scale engineering applications.

Although perchlorates were discovered on Mars in 2008 by the Phoenix lander, none of the simulants include perchlorates. This reduces the health risk posed by the simulants compared to actual Martian soil. Early simulants predated this discovery, but the latest simulant, MGS-1, still does not include them.

== See also ==
- List of Mars analogs
- Lunar regolith simulant
- Martian soil
- Mineralogy of Mars
- Regolith
- Mars Desert Research Station
