= Sithampoondi =

Sittampoondi Sittampoondi
- Village
- Country: India
- State: Tamil Nadu
- District: Namakkal

Languages
  - Official: Tamil
- Time zone: UTC+5:30 (IST)
- Postal code: 637203
- Vehicle registration: TN-28/TN-88
- Nearest city: Thiruchengode
- Lok Sabha constituency: Namakkal

Sittampoondi is a small village in Namakkal district, Tamil Nadu India. The nearest city is Tiruchengode. Sittampoondi is known for its green Sugarcane and Paddy fields. The village is fed by irrigation from the river Kaveri, 3 mi (4.8 km) away. Sittampoondi is the group of eighteen villages (called Patties). Gounders are the dominant community people in this area and most of them are farmers.

== Platinum discovery ==
The Government announced that platinum had been discovered in this area.

== Study on lunar soil ==
Geologists from Periyar University, Salem; the National Institute of Technology, Tiruchi; the Indian Institute of Science, Bangalore, and the National Geophysical Research Institute, Hyderabad, "concurred" that rocks from Sittampoondi and Kunnamalai had similar properties to the soil on the Moon.

S. Anbazhagan, Professor and Head of the Department of Geology, Periyar University, said: "We had done spectral studies on the lunar soil and we discovered its equivalent at Sittampoondi in 2004 when I was working in the Indian Institute of Technology-Bombay. ISRO’s soil scientists coordinated with us in this project."

This soil with rocks is used by ISRO to test its rover of Chandrayaan-2 and Chandrayaan-3.
