= Fine-Resolution Epithermal Neutron Detector =

Fine-Resolution Epithermal Neutron Detector (FREND)
- Operator: European Space Agency
- Manufacturer: Russian Space Research Institute
- Function: Neutron detector and dosimeter
- Mission duration: Planned: 7 years
- Website: np.cosmos.ru/en-us/instruments/frend

Properties
- Mass: 36 kg (79 lb)

Host spacecraft
- Spacecraft: Trace Gas Orbiter
- Operator: ESA
- Launch date: 14 March 2016
- Rocket: Proton-M/Briz-M
- COSPAR ID: 2016-017A

The Fine-Resolution Epithermal Neutron Detector (FREND) is a neutron detector that is part of the instrument payload on board the Trace Gas Orbiter (TGO), launched to Mars in March 2016. This instrument is currently mapping hydrogen levels to a maximum depth of 1 m (3 ft 3 in) beneath the Martian surface, thus revealing shallow water ice distribution. This instrument has an improved resolution of 7.5 times over the one Russia contributed to NASA's 2001 Mars Odyssey orbiter.

== Overview ==
FREND can provide information while orbiting Mars on the presence of hydrogen, in the form of water or hydrated minerals in the top 1 m (3 ft 3 in) of the Martian surface. Locations where hydrogen is found may indicate water-ice deposits, which is one of the key ingredients for life. Mapping ground ice could also be useful for future resource utilization (ISRU) and crewed missions.

FREND also features a dosimeter to monitor the radiation environment along its orbit around Mars.

== Objectives ==
The main science objective of the instrument is to carry out high spatial resolution mapping of epithermal and fast neutron fluxes from the Martian surface. FREND will work in synergy and complement orbital and ground data as measured the Dynamic Albedo of Neutrons (DAN) instrument on the Curiosity rover, the ADRON-RM instrument on the Rosalind Franklin rover and the ADRON-EM on the Kazachok.

The second goal of FREND is to use its dosimeter to measure the radiation dose at the TGO orbit from energetic particles of galactic cosmic rays and solar flares. The data will be used to estimate exposure levels of spacecraft and maintain radiation safety of crewed interplanetary flights.

== Principle and development ==
FREND	Parameter/units
Function	Neutron detector and dosimeter
Mass	36 kg (79 lb)
Dimensions	465 x 380 x 370 mm
Power consumption	14 W
Energy range	Neutrons: 0.4–500 keV; Charged particles: 0.5–10 MeV
Surface resolution	Approx. 40 m (130 ft)
Depth resolution	≈ 1 m (3 ft 3 in)
Field of view	10°
Telemetry rate	50 Mbit/day

Cosmic rays are sufficiently energetic to break apart atoms in the top one or two metres of Mars' surface, releasing high-energy neutrons, which can be measured by FREND instrument. The distribution of neutron velocities measured reveals the hydrogen content, which are a good indicator of hydrogen abundance —water or hydrated minerals— in the shallow subsurface of Mars.

FREND uses inherited technology developed by the Russian Space Research Institute and flown on the High Energy Neutron Detector (HEND) on Mars Odyssey; the Mercury Gamma and Neutron Spectrometer (MGNS) on BepiColombo; the Lunar Exploration Neutron Detector (LEND) on the Lunar Reconnaissance Orbiter, and Dynamic Albedo of Neutrons (DAN) on Curiosity rover.

This instrument's key components are four detectors containing Helium-3 for neutrons with energies from 0.4 keV to 500 keV, and a stilbene-based scintillator for high-energy neutrons up to 10 MeV. Each of the four ^{3}He detectors counts neutrons independently for increased reliability. All five detectors are encased within a collimator that improves the resolution 7.5 times over the one Russia contributed to NASA's Mars Odyssey orbiter.

The Principal Investigator is Igor G. Mitrofanov, from the Russian Space Research Institute (IKI). Mitrofanov is also the PI for ExoMars' ADRON-RM and ADRON-EM neutron detector instruments.

== See also ==
- Astrobiology
- Life on Mars
- Water on Mars
