= Outline of Mars =

Overview of and topical guide to Mars

The following outline is provided as an overview of and topical guide to Mars:

Mars – fourth planet from the Sun and the second-smallest planet in the Solar System, after Mercury. Named after the Roman god of war, it is often referred to as the "Red Planet" because the iron oxide prevalent on its surface gives it a reddish appearance. Mars is a terrestrial planet with a thin atmosphere, having surface features reminiscent both of the impact craters of the Moon and the valleys, deserts, and polar ice caps of Earth.

== Classification of Mars ==
- Astronomical object
  - Gravitationally rounded object
    - Planet
      - Planet of the Solar System
        - Inner planet
        - Superior planet
      - Terrestrial planet

== Location of Mars ==
- Milky Way Galaxy – barred spiral galaxy
  - Orion Arm – a spiral arm of the Milky Way
    - Solar System – the Sun and the objects that orbit it, including 8 planets, the 4th planet from the Sun being Mars
      - Orbit of Mars

== Features of Mars ==
- Atmosphere of Mars
  - Circulation
- Climate of Mars
- Martian surface
  - Geography of Mars
    - Outflow channels
  - Geology of Mars
    - Martian dichotomy
    - Martian polar ice caps
- Solar eclipses on Mars
- Orbit of Mars

=== Surface of Mars ===
Martian surface

- Concentric crater fill
- Dark slope streak
- Dust Devil Tracks
- Lineated valley fill
- Mars surface color
- Martian geyser
- Martian soil
- Scalloped topography
- Seasonal flows on warm Martian slopes
- Swiss cheese features
- Valley networks (Mars)
- Water on Mars
  - Glaciers on Mars
  - Groundwater on Mars

==== Landforms on Mars ====
- Martian chaos terrain
  - Areas of chaos terrain on Mars
- Chasmata on Mars
- Craters on Mars
- Gullies on Mars
- Labes on Mars
- Mountains on Mars
- Quadrangles on Mars
- Plains on Mars
- Valles on Mars
- Surface features of Mars seen by the Spirit rover

== Natural satellites of Mars ==
Moons of Mars

- Phobos
  - Phobos monolith
  - Transit of Phobos from Mars
- Deimos
  - Transit of Deimos from Mars

== History of Mars ==
- History of Mars observation
- Martian canals
  - List of Martian canals
- Classical albedo features on Mars
- Timeline of discoveries of water on Mars
  - Lakes on Mars

== Exploration of Mars ==
Exploration of Mars

- Mars aircraft
- Mars analogs
- Artificial objects on Mars
- Mars atmospheric entry
- Mars Direct
- Mars Exploration Joint Initiative
- Mars flyby
- Mars landing
- Life on Mars
- Martian meteorite
- Mars ocean hypothesis
- Rocks on Mars
- Mars rover
- Mars Scout Program

=== Flyby and direct missions to explore Mars ===
Missions to Mars

- Mars program
  - Mars 1
  - Mars 2
  - Mars 3
- Mariner program
  - Mariner 3
  - Mariner 4
  - Mariner 6 and 7
  - Mariner 8
  - Mariner 9
- Zond program
  - Zond 2
- Viking program
  - Viking 1
  - Viking 2
- Phobos program
- Mars Observer
- Mars Pathfinder
  - Sojourner
- Mars Global Surveyor
- Mars Climate Orbiter
- Mars Polar Lander
- Deep Space 2
- 2001 Mars Odyssey
- Nozomi spacecraft
- Mars Express
  - Beagle 2
- Mars Exploration Rover
  - Spirit rover
  - Opportunity rover
- Mars Reconnaissance Orbiter
- Rosetta spacecraft
- Phoenix spacecraft
- Dawn spacecraft
- Mars Science Laboratory
  - Curiosity rover
- MAVEN
- Mars Orbiter Mission
- Exomars Program
  - ExoMars Trace Gas Orbiter
  - Schiaparelli lander
- Insight lander
- Mars 2020
  - Perseverance rover
  - Ingenuity helicopter
- Emirates Mars Mission
- Tianwen-1
  - Tianwen-1 Orbiter
  - Tianwen-1 Deployable Camera
  - Tianwen-1 lander
  - Zhurong rover

=== Proposed missions to explore Mars ===
- ExoMars
  - Kazachok Lander Platform
  - Rosalind Franklin rover
- Mars sample return mission
- Human mission to Mars
  - List of crewed Mars mission plans
  - Mars Outpost
  - Mars to Stay
  - Colonization of Mars
  - Terraforming of Mars

== Mars in popular culture ==
- Mars in fiction
  - John Carter of Mars
  - Martians
    - Mars Attacks!
    - The War of the Worlds
  - Films set on Mars

== See also ==
- Outline of astronomy
  - Outline of the Solar System
- Outline of space exploration
- Astronomy on Mars
- Timekeeping on Mars
- Darian calendar
