= ADRON-RM =

Neutron spectrometer on mission to Mars

- Operator: European Space Agency
- Manufacturer: Russian Space Research Institute
- Instrument type: neutron spectrometer
- Function: hydrogen and H_{2}O detector
- Mission duration: ≥ 7 months
- Website: www.iki.rssi.ru/eng/exomars2018.htm

Properties
- Mass: 1.7 kg

Host spacecraft
- Spacecraft: Rosalind Franklin rover
- Operator: ESA
- Launch date: NET 2028

ADRON-RM (Autonomous Detector of Radiation of Neutrons Onboard Rover at Mars) is a neutron spectrometer to search for subsurface water ice and hydrated minerals. This analyser is part of the science payload on board the European Space Agency's Rosalind Franklin rover, tasked to search for biosignatures and biomarkers on Mars. The rover is planned to be launched not earlier than 2028 and land on Mars in 2029.

ADRON-RM is a near copy of ADRO-EM on the stationary ExoMars 2020 surface platform and the Dynamic Albedo of Neutrons (DAN) neutron detector on board NASA's Curiosity rover, all designed by Igor Mitrofanov from the Russian Space Research Institute (IKI).

== Overview ==
ADRON-RM is a neutron spectrometer that will search for hydrogen in the form of bound water or water ice, and hydrogen-bearing compounds. It will be used in combination with WISDOM instrument (a ground-penetrating radar) to study the subsurface beneath the rover and to search for optimal sites for drilling and sample collection. It can also detect trace elements such as Gd and major elements that constitute soil, such as Cl, Fe, Ti. It will also monitor the neutron component of the radiation background on Mars' surface.

== Development ==
ADRON-RM	Performance/units
Mass	1.7 kg
Power consumption	5 W
Dimensions	≈ 4 × 20 × 21 cm
Energy range for CETN (Note: counter of epithermal neutrons)	0.4 eV - 1 keV
Energy range for CTN (Note: counter of thermal neutrons)	≤ 1 keV
Detectors	Two ^{3}He proportional counters
Accumulation period	20 sec (changeable)

The Principal Investigator is Igor Mitrofanov from the Russian Space Research Institute (IKI). The instrument is almost a reproduction of the Dynamic Albedo of Neutrons (DAN) neutron detector on board NASA's Curiosity rover also developed in Russia. Mitrofanov is also developing the active gamma and neutron spectrometer, ADRON-EM (Active Detection of Radiation of Nuclei-ExoMars) for the stationary Kazachok lander—the primary goal of which will be to measure water distribution in the Martian subsurface. Measurements by ADRON-RM and ADRON-EM will work in synergy with other ExoMars instruments.

ADRON-RM uses two ^{3}He proportional counters with a cylindrical shape of about 25 mm in diameter and 55 mm in total length. Each counter is filled with ^{3}He gas under 4 atmospheres of pressure. Each neutron detector will measure two 32-channel spectra. The data will be obtained as routine and passive measurements, which will not be saved but will be immediately transmitted from the instrument to the rover computer. This means that all ADRON-RM measurements will be performed only when the 'Rover Compute Element' is active (daytime).

ADRON-RM is installed inside the ExoMars rover body at the rear balcony. The height above the surface is 0.8 m (2.6 ft).

== Objectives ==
The stated objectives of the ADRON-RM scientific investigation include:

- Measurement of the distribution of bulk hydrogen content in the form of free or bound water.
- Evaluation of the bulk composition of major soil neutron absorption elements (Cl, Fe, Ti S, etc.)
- Monitoring of the neutron component of the natural radiation background and estimation of neutron radiation dose at the Martian surface from Galactic cosmic rays and solar particle events.
- The potential to monitor seasonal changes of the neutron environment due to variations of atmospheric and subsurface properties.

== See also ==
- Astrobiology
- Life on Mars
- Water on Mars
