= Rafael Navarro-Gonzalez =

Mexican astrobiologist (1959–2021)

- Born: Rafael Navarro-González; April 25, 1959; Mexico City, Mexico
- Died: January 28, 2021 (aged 61); Mexico
- Education: Bachelors in Biology, Doctorate in Chemistry
- Alma mater: National Autonomous University of Mexico (BS-Biology); University of Maryland at College Park (PhD-Chemistry)
- Scientific career
- Fields: Astrobiology, Biology, Chemistry, Physics

Rafael Navarro-Gonzalez, also known as Rafael Navarro-González and Rafael Navarro, (April 25, 1959 – January 28, 2021) was a Mexican NASA astrobiologist who worked with the Curiosity rover on the planet Mars, and who helped lead researchers in the identification of ancient organic compounds on the planet. He was an internationally recognized scientist who merged laboratory simulations, field studies and modeling based on biology, chemistry and physics. Navarro-Gonzalez noted the significance of volcanic lightning in the origin of life on Earth. His professional work included the SAM component on the Mars Science Laboratory, and the HABIT instrument on the Exomars mission.

He died from complications of COVID-19 on January 28, 2021. In April 2021, NASA named a mountain, "Rafael Navarro Mountain", on the planet Mars in his honor.

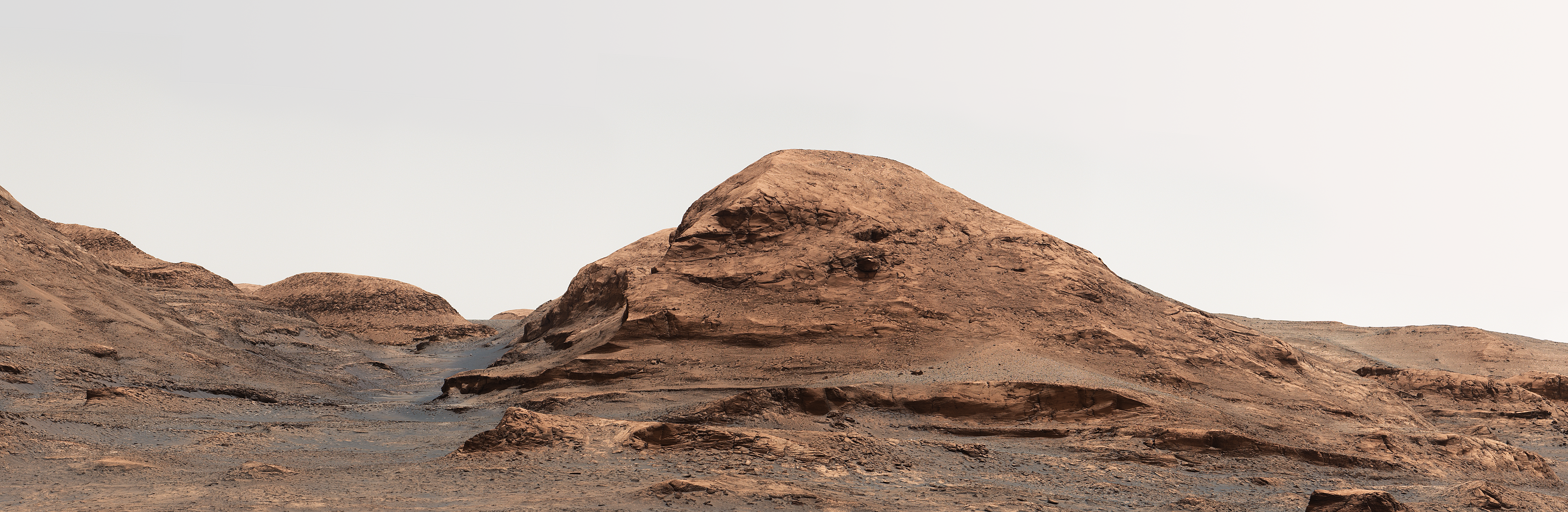
Rafael Navarro Mountain on the planet Mars (Curiosity rover; April 5, 2021)

== Awards and honors ==
- Alexander von Humboldt Medal (2009)
- Molina fellowship (first recipient)
- World Academy of Sciences Award in Earth Sciences

== See also ==
- List of mountains on Mars
- List of mountains on Mars by height
