= LaRa =

Belgian radio science experiment

LaRa (Lander Radioscience)
- Operator: ESA & Roscosmos
- Manufacturer: Antwerp Space N.V.
- Instrument type: Radio science/Transponder
- Function: Monitor the rotation and orientation of Mars
- Mission duration: Planned: ≥ 1 Earth year
- Website: lara.oma.be

Properties
- Mass: less than 2.2 kg
- Dimensions: Length: 23 cm for the transponder (7-9 cm for the antennas)
- Power consumption: ≈ 40 W
- Spectral band: X band (uplink: 7.174 GHz, downlink: 8.428 GHz)

Host spacecraft
- Spacecraft: Kazachok
- Operator: ESA & Roscosmos
- Launch date: August–October 2022
- Rocket: Proton-M/Briz-M
- Launch site: Baikonur

LaRa (Lander Radioscience) was a Belgian radio science experiment that will be placed onboard Kazachok, planned to be launched in 2022. LaRa will monitor the Doppler frequency shift of a radio signal traveling between the Martian lander and the Earth. These Doppler measurements will be used to precisely observe the orientation and rotation of Mars, leading to a better knowledge of the internal structure of the planet.

Kazachok was cancelled, and the ExoMars mission was moved to 2028.

== Instrument description ==
LaRa will obtain coherent two-way Doppler measurements from the X band radio link between Kazachok and large antennas on Earth, like those of the Deep space network. The relative radial velocity between the Earth and the Martian lander is inferred from Doppler shifts measured at the Earth ground stations. Masers at the Earth's ground stations ensure the frequency stability. Véronique Dehant, scientist at the Royal Observatory of Belgium, is the Principal Investigator of the experiment.

Antwerp Space N.V., a subsidiary of OHB SE, is the manufacturer of the LaRa instrument. The main parts of the transponder are the coherent detector, the transmitter with the solid-state power amplifier, the micro controller unit, the receiver and the power supply unit. The Allan deviation (quantifying the frequency stability of the signal) of the measurements is expected to be lower than $10^{-13}$at 60 second integration time.

The LaRa high-performance antennas were designed at the Université catholique de Louvain in Belgium to obtain an optimal antenna gain centered on an elevation (angle of the line-of-sight from the lander to Earth) of about 30° to 55°. There will be three antennas: two for the transmission (for redundancy purposes) and one for reception. Cables connect the transponder to the three antennas.

Belgium and the Belgian Federal Science Policy Office (BELSPO) fund the development and the manufacturing of LaRa through ESA's PRODEX program.

== Scientific objectives ==
LaRa will study the rotation of Mars as well as its internal structure, with particular focus on its core. It will observe the Martian precession rate, the nutations, and the length-of-day variations, as well as the polar motion. The precession and the nutations are variations in the orientation of Mars's rotation axis in space, the precession being the very long term motion (about 170 000 years for Mars) while the nutations are the variations with a shorter period (annual, semi-annual, ter-annual, periods). A precise measurement of the Martian nutations enables an independent determination of the size and density of the liquid core because of a resonance in the nutation amplitudes. The resonant amplification of the low-frequency forced nutations depends sensibly on the size, moment of inertia, and flattening of the core. This amplification is expected to correspond to a displacement of between a few to forty centimeters on Mars surface. Observing the amplification allows to confirm the liquid state of the core and to determine some core properties.

LaRa will also measure variations in the rotation angular momentum due to the redistribution of masses, such as the migration of ice from the polar caps to the atmosphere and the sublimation/condensation cycle of atmospheric CO_{2}.

== See also ==
- Rotation and Interior Structure Experiment, a similar radio science experiment by the InSight Mars lander
