= Javier Martín-Torres =

Spanish physicist

Javier Martín-Torres (born 27 July 1970) is a Spanish physicist with interests in atmospheric sciences (mainly Earth, Mars, and exoplanet atmospheres), geophysics, and astrobiology. He has published over 100 scientific papers in these areas.

He is a chaired professor in Planetary Sciences at the University of Aberdeen, UK, and senior research scientist of the Spanish Research Council, assigned to the Instituto Andaluz de Ciencias de la Tierra, located in Armilla, Granada, Spain. He is also a visiting professor at the School of Physics and Astronomy at the University of Edinburgh, a Specially Appointed Professor at Okayama University. Previously he has worked for ESA, the California Institute of Technology, Lunar and Planetary Laboratory, and 10 years for NASA at the Langley Research Center and Jet Propulsion Laboratory.

== Mars research ==
Martin-Torres is the principal investigator of the HABIT (HabitAbility: Brine, Irradiation and Temperature) instrument, which was supposed to travel to Mars as part of the scientific payload of the suspended ExoMars 2020 mission to investigate, amongst other things, the water exchange cycle between the atmosphere and the Martian regolith.

Martin-Torres is also a Co-I on the Mars Science Laboratory/Curiosity rover, ExoMars Trace Gas Orbiter ACS instrument, and ISEM/ExoMars rover.

=== Transient liquid water on Mars ===
The article Transient liquid water and water activity at Gale crater on Mars, reported the existence of a daily cycle of water exchange between the atmospheric boundary layer and the ground, including a phase during which the water remains in a transient liquid state. This is possible thanks to the presence in the soil of perchlorates, a highly hygroscopic kind of chlorine salt which seem to be ubiquitous over the Martian surface. These salts have the capability of catching water vapour from the environment up to the point of becoming solved in it forming concentrated solutions or brines. It is an extreme case of hygroscopy known as deliquescence.

The eutectic temperature of these brines allows its permanence in liquid state under the registered Martian environmental conditions in the study area of Curiosity, close to the equator, where they are the least favourable for this to happen. Therefore, it is expected that the phenomenon is more intense in terms of duration of the liquid phase in higher latitudes.

The presence of liquid water on present day Mars entails transcendent consequences in a number of aspects of the planet's exploration. Firstly, it casts a new light on the comprehension of Martian environment, and can be the key to understand some morphological features of the surface, such as the so-called Recurrent Slope Lineae (RSLs). In addition, the discovery has posed the necessity for taking special precautions to avoid biological contamination of the planet with terrestrial organisms carried on board the spacecraft to be sent in the next missions, since the availability of liquid water multiply the possibilities for them to survive and thrive in certain places. Finally, water can be a valuable in-situ resource at the disposal of a crew which is eventually sent to Mars someday.

However, the brines themselves have not been monitored yet, and a quantification of the phenomenon is still missing. This is what the Brine Observation Transition to Liquid Experiment (BOTTLE, one of the units composing HABIT instrument) is being developed for.

== Fight against COVID-19 ==
During the 2020 COVID pandemic, Martin-Torres led the Department of Planetary Sciences Team to build a ventilator to help treat the most severe cases of coronavirus. The Team used their skills to develop life support systems for crewed space missions for this development. A ventilator is used to take over the body's breathing process when the disease caused a patient's lungs to fail.

The Aberdeen device was called ATMO-Vent (Atmospheric Mixture Optimization Ventilator).

== Greenhouse Gas Regulation: NF3 as a greenhouse gas ==
In 2020 Martin-Torres elaborated the state-of-the-art scientific report about NF3 as a greenhouse gas that was attached to the legal brief submitted by Dr Thomas Muinzer University of Aberdeen, Javier Martin-Torres, and the Scottish Climate Emergency Legal Network"Legal Brief". 29 October 2020., to request that NF3 was included as a greenhouse gas in UK regulations. As a result of this brief, in 2023, the UK Government will amend the UK Climate Change Act to include NF3 as a greenhouse gas. "Amendment" (PDF).

== World-record nanopore sequencing without amplification ==
Martin-Torres led the team that has sequenced DNA of microorganisms using the smallest amount of material ever using the minION device developed by Oxford Nanopore Technologies. The researchers only needed two picograms for the sequencing. This advance suggests that super-tiny amounts of DNA can be detected in Martian rocks if it is there.

== Growth of microorganisms in a Martian regolith simulant at reduced water activity ==
In 2026, Javier Martín-Torres co-authored a pioneering study published in Scientific Reports titled "Growth of microorganisms in a Martian regolith simulant at reduced water activity."Raghavendra, Jyothi Basapathi; Zorzano, Maria-Paz; Martin-Torres, Javier (2026). "Growth of microorganisms in a Martian regolith simulant at reduced water activity". Scientific Reports. 16 (1) 7499. Bibcode:2026NatSR..16.7499R. doi:10.1038/s41598-026-35595-2. PMC 12963637. PMID 41786765.. The research demonstrated that indigenous microorganisms from a Mojave-derived Martian soil simulant (MMS-2) could persist and accumulate DNA—consistent with possible replication—at water activity levels as low as 0.34 under Earth ambient conditions, surpassing the previously documented lower limit of 0.585 for microbial growth on Earth. This finding, achieved through controlled incubation experiments monitoring DNA mass over time, represents a potential world record for the lowest water activity supporting such activity in solid substrates, with implications for expanding understandings of Martian habitability, the role of atmospheric water vapor in sustaining life, and enhanced planetary protection protocols for space missions

== Selected publications ==
- F. Javier Martín-Torres and María-Paz Zorzano, The Fate of Freedom of a Space Exploration Mission Encountering Life and the Liberty of the "Encountered" Extra-Terrestrial Beings, chapter of the book The Meaning of Liberty Beyond Earth, Space and Society Series, Springer International Publishing; 2015 edition, ISBN 978-3-319-09567-7.
- F. J. Martín-Torres and J. F. Buenestado, ¿Qué sabemos de la vida en el Universo?, Editorial: CSIC y Catarata, ISBN 978-84-8319-840-7, Páginas: 128, 2013
- Martín-Torres F. J., and A. Delgado-Bonal, A Mathematic Approach to Nitrogen Fixation Through Earth History, chapter of book Nitrogen in Planetary Systems: The Early Evolution of Atmospheres of Terrestrial Planets, ISBN 978-1-4614-5190-7, Springer-Verlag, 2013.
- Trigo-Rodríguez, J. M. and F. J. Martín-Torres, Implication of Impacts in the Young Earth Sun Paradox and the Evolution of Earth's Atmosphere, chapter of book Nitrogen in Planetary Systems: The Early Evolution of Atmospheres of Terrestrial Planets, ISBN 978-1-4614-5190-7, Springer-Verlag, 2013.
