= Mars surface color =

Extraterrestrial geography

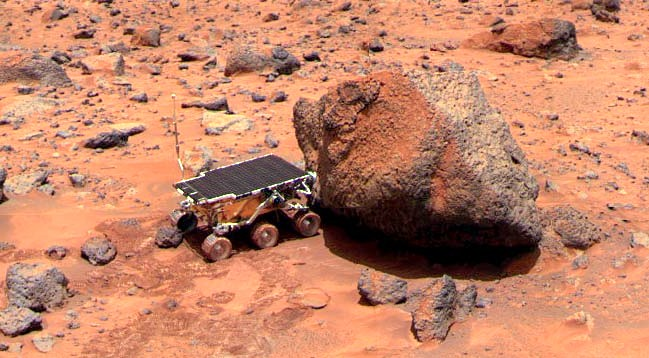
Yogi Rock, analyzed by the Sojourner rover (July 4, 1997)

Mars 360 animation

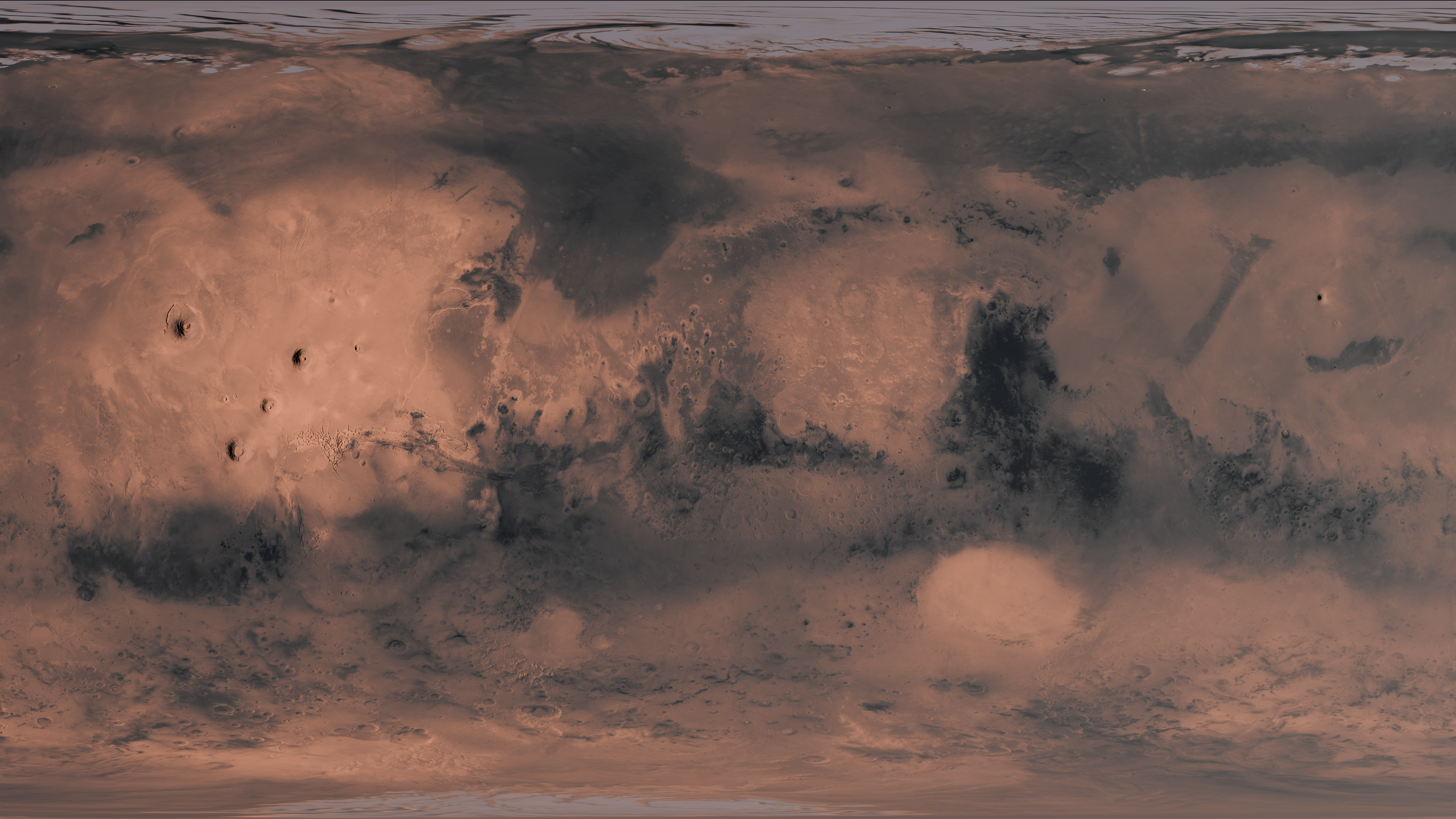
Mars surface map rendered using a color map and a heightmap from NASA

The surface color of the planet Mars appears reddish from a distance because of rusty atmospheric dust. From close up, it looks more of a butterscotch, and other common surface colors include golden, brown, tan, and greenish, depending on minerals.

The apparent colour of the Martian surface enabled humans to distinguish it from other planets early in human history and motivated them to weave fables of war in association with Mars. One of its earliest recorded names, Har decher, literally meant "Red One" in Egyptian. Its color may have also contributed to a malignant association in Indian astrology, as it was given the names Angaraka and Lohitanga, both reflecting the distinctively red color of Mars as seen by the naked eye.

== Reason for red and its extensiveness ==
Modern observations indicate that Mars's redness is skin deep. The Martian surface looks reddish primarily because of a ubiquitous dust layer (particles are typically between 3 μm to 45 μm across) that is typically on the order of millimeters thick. Even where the thickest deposits of this reddish dust occur, such as the Tharsis area, the dust layer is probably not more than 2 meters (6.6 ft) thick. Therefore, the reddish dust is essentially an extremely thin veneer on the Martian surface and does not represent the bulk of the Martian subsurface in any way.

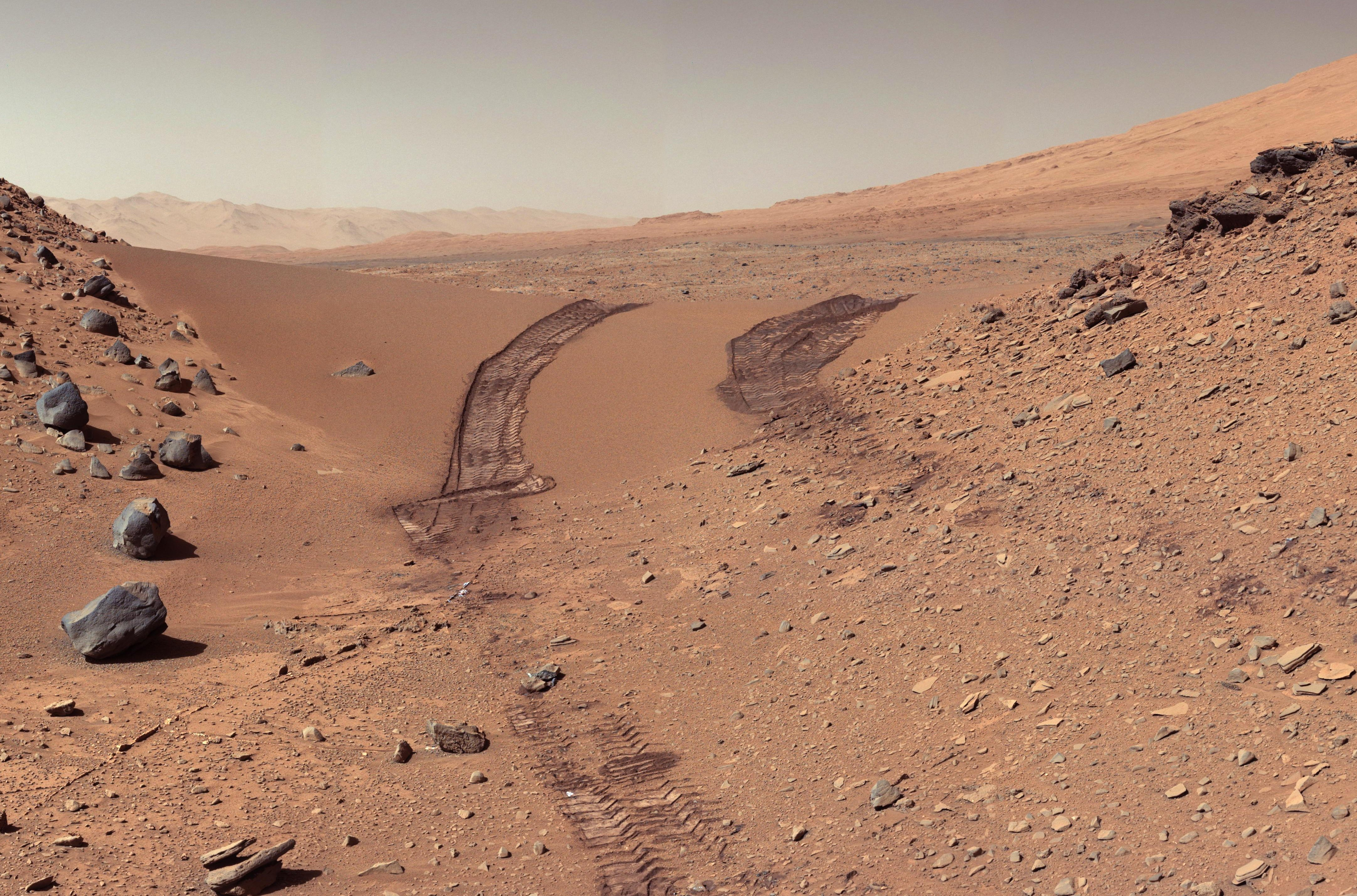
Curiosity's view of Martian soil and boulders after crossing the "Dingo Gap" sand dune (February 9, 2014; raw color)

Martian dust is reddish mostly due to the spectral properties of nanophase ferric oxides (npOx) that tend to dominate in the visible spectrum. The specific npOx minerals have not been fully constrained, but nanocrystalline red hematite (α-Fe_{2}O_{3}) may be the volumetrically dominant one, at least at the less than 100 μm sampling depth of infrared remote sensors such as the Mars Express OMEGA instrument. The rest of the iron in the dust, perhaps as much as 50% of the mass, may be in titanium enriched magnetite (Fe_{3}O_{4}). Magnetite is usually black in colour with a black streak, and does not contribute to the reddish hue of dust.

The mass fraction of chlorine and sulfur in the dust is greater than that which has been found (by the Mars Exploration Rovers Spirit and Opportunity) in the soil types at Gusev crater and Meridiani Planum. The sulfur in the dust also shows a positive correlation with npOx. This suggests that very limited chemical alteration by thin brine films (facilitated by the formation of frost from atmospheric H_{2}O) may be producing some of the npOx. In addition, remote sensing observations of atmospheric dust (which shows slight compositional and grain size differences from surface dust), indicates that the bulk volume of dust grains consists of plagioclase feldspar and zeolite, along with minor pyroxene and olivine components. Such fine material can be generated easily via mechanical erosion from feldspar-rich basalts, such as rocks in the southern highlands on Mars. Collectively, these observations indicate that any chemical alteration of dust by aqueous activity has been very minor.

== The occurrence of nanophase ferric oxides (npOx) in dust ==
There are several processes that can yield npOx as an oxidation product without the involvement of free oxygen (O_{2}). One or more of those processes may have dominated on Mars, since atmospheric modeling over geologic time scales indicates that free O_{2} (generated mostly via the photodissociation of water (H_{2}O)) may have always been a trace component with a partial pressure not exceeding 0.1 micropascal (μPa).

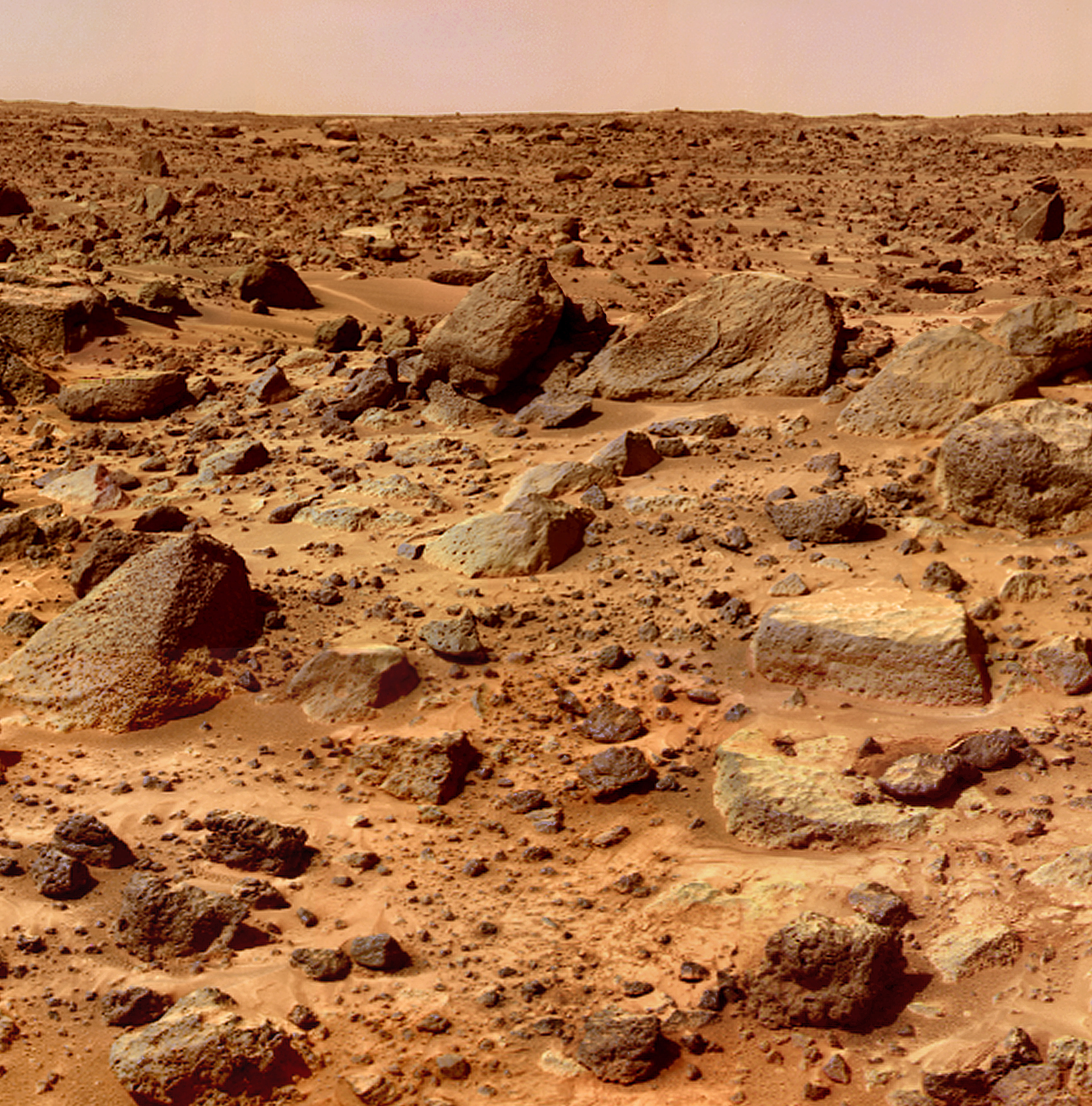
Rock-strewn surface imaged by Mars Pathfinder (July 4, 1997)

One oxygen-(O_{2})-independent process involves a direct chemical reaction of ferrous iron (Fe^{2+}) (commonly present in typical igneous minerals) or metallic iron (Fe) with water (H_{2}O) to produce ferric iron (Fe^{3+}(aq)), which typically leads to hydroxides such as goethite (FeO•OH) under experimental conditions. While this reaction with water (H_{2}O) is thermodynamically disfavored, it may be sustained nevertheless, by the rapid loss of the molecular hydrogen (H_{2}) byproduct. The reaction can be further facilitated by dissolved carbon dioxide (CO_{2}) and sulfur dioxide (SO_{2}), which lower the pH of brine films increasing the concentration of the more oxidative hydrogen ions (H^{+}).

However, higher temperatures (c. 300 °C) are usually needed to decompose Fe^{3+} (oxy)hydroxides such as goethite into hematite. The formation of palagonitic tephra on the upper slopes of the Mauna Kea volcano may mirror such processes, as consistent with the intriguing spectral and magnetic similarities between palagonitic tephra and Martian dust. In spite of the need for such kinetic conditions, prolonged arid and low pH conditions on Mars (such as diurnal brine films) may lead to the eventual transformation of goethite into hematite given the thermodynamic stability of the latter.

Fe and Fe^{2+} may also be oxidized by the activity of hydrogen peroxide (H_{2}O_{2}). Even though the H_{2}O_{2} abundance in the Martian atmosphere is very low, it is temporally persistent and a much stronger oxidant than H_{2}O. H_{2}O_{2}-driven oxidation to Fe^{3+} (usually as hydrated minerals), has been observed experimentally. In addition, the pervasiveness of the α-Fe_{2}O_{3} spectral signature, but not of hydrated Fe^{3+} minerals reinforces the possibility that npOx may form even without the thermodynamically disfavored intermediaries such as goethite.

There is also evidence that hematite might form from magnetite in the course of erosion processes. Experiments at the Mars Simulation Laboratory of Aarhus University in Denmark show that when a mixture of magnetite powder, quartz sand, and quartz dust particles is tumbled in a flask, some of the magnetite converts to hematite, coloring the sample red. The proposed explanation for this effect is that when quartz is fractured by the grinding, certain chemical bonds get broken at the newly exposed surfaces; when these surfaces come in contact with magnetite, oxygen atoms may be transferred from quartz surface to magnetite, forming hematite.

== Red skies on Mars ==
Approximately true-colour images from the Mars Pathfinder and Mars Exploration Rover missions indicate that the Martian sky may also appear reddish to humans. Absorption of sunlight in the 0.4-0.6 μm range by dust particles may be the primary reason for the redness of the sky. An additional contribution may come from the dominance of photon scattering by dust particles at wavelengths in the order 3 μm, which is in the near-infrared range, over Rayleigh scattering by gas molecules.
