= Outline (list) =

List arranged to show hierarchical relationships

An outline, also called a hierarchical outline, is a list arranged to show hierarchical relationships and is a type of tree structure. An outline is used to present the main points (in sentences) or topics (terms) of a given subject. Each item in an outline may be divided into additional sub-items. If an organizational level in an outline is to be sub-divided, it shall have at least two subcategories, although one subcategory is acceptable on the third and fourth levels, as advised by major style manuals in current use. An outline may be used as a drafting tool of a document, or as a summary of the content of a document or of the knowledge in an entire field. It is not to be confused with the general context of the term "outline", which is a summary or overview of a subject presented verbally or written in prose (for example, The Outline of History is not an outline of the type presented below). The outlines described in this article are lists, and come in several varieties.

A sentence outline is a tool for composing a document, such as an essay, a paper, a book, or even an encyclopedia. It is a list used to organize the facts or points to be covered, and their order of presentation, by section. Topic outlines list the subtopics of a subject, arranged in levels, and while they can be used to plan a composition, they are most often used as a summary, such as in the form of a table of contents or the topic list in a college course's syllabus.

Outlines are further differentiated by the index prefixing used, or lack thereof. Many outlines include a numerical or alphanumerical prefix preceding each entry in the outline, to provide a specific path for each item, to aid in referring to and discussing the entries listed. An alphanumerical outline uses alternating letters and numbers to identify entries. A decimal outline uses only numbers as prefixes. An outline without prefixes is called a "bare outline".

Specialized applications of outlines also exist. A reverse outline is a list of sentences or topics that is created from an existing work, as a revision tool; it may show the gaps in the document's coverage so that they may be filled, and may help in rearranging sentences or topics to improve the structure and flow of the work. An integrated outline is a composition tool for writing scholastic works, in which the sources, and the writer's notes from the sources, are integrated into the outline for ease of reference during the writing process.

A software program designed for processing outlines is called an outliner.

== Types of outlines ==
Outlines are differentiated by style, the inclusion of prefixes, and specialized purpose. There are also hand-written outlines and digitized outlines, such as those contained within an outliner.

=== By style ===
There are two main styles of outline: sentence outlines and topic outlines.

==== A sample topic outline application: An outline of human knowledge ====
Propædia is the historical attempt of the Encyclopædia Britannica to present a hierarchical "Outline of Knowledge" in a separate volume in the 15th edition of 1974. The Outline of Knowledge was a project by Mortimer Adler. Propædia had three levels, 10 "Parts" at the top level, 41 "Divisions" at the middle level and 167 "Sections" at the bottom level, numbered, for example, "1. Matter and Energy", "1.1 Atoms", "1.1.1. Structure and Properties of Sync".

=== By prefixing used ===
A feature included in many outlines is prefixing. Similar to section numbers, an outline prefix is a label (usually alphanumeric or numeric) placed at the beginning of an outline entry to assist in referring to it.

==== Bare outlines ====
Bare outlines include no prefixes.

==== Alphanumeric outline ====
An alphanumeric outline includes a prefix at the beginning of each topic as a reference aid. The prefix is in the form of Roman numerals for the top level, upper-case letters (in the alphabet of the language being used) for the next level, Arabic numerals for the next level, and then lowercase letters for the next level. For further levels, the order is started over again. Each numeral or letter is followed by a period, and each item is capitalized, as in the following sample:

Thesis statement: E-mail and internet monitoring, as currently practiced, is an invasion of employees' rights in the workplace.

I. The situation: Over 80% of today's companies monitor their employees.

A. To prevent fraudulent activities, theft, and other workplace related violations.
B. To more efficiently monitor employee productivity.
C. To prevent any legal liabilities due to harassing or offensive communications.

II. What are employees' privacy rights when it comes to electronic monitoring and surveillance in the workplace?

A. American employees have basically no legal protection from mean and snooping bosses.

1. There are no federal or State laws protecting employees.
2. Employees may assert privacy protection for their own personal effects.

B. Most managers believe that there is no right to privacy in the workplace.

1. Workplace communications should be about work; anything else is a misuse of company equipment and company time
2. Employers have a right to prevent misuse by monitoring employee communications

Some call the Roman numerals "A-heads" (for "A-level headings"), the upper-case letters, "B-heads", and so on. Some writers also prefer to insert a blank line between the A-heads and B-heads, while often keeping the B-heads and C-heads together.

If more levels of outline are needed, lower-case Roman numerals and numbers and lower-case letters, sometimes with single and double parenthesis can be used, although the exact order is not well defined, and usage varies widely.

The scheme recommended by the MLA Handbook, and the Purdue Online Writing Lab, among others, uses the usual five levels, as described above, then repeats the Arabic numerals and lower-case letter surrounded by parentheses (round brackets) – I. A. 1. a. i. (1) (a) – and does not specify any lower levels, though "(i)" is usually next. In common practice, lower levels yet are usually Arabic numerals and lowercase letters again, and sometimes lower-case Roman again, with single parentheses – 1) a) i) – but usage varies. MLA style is sometimes incorrectly referred to as APA style, but the APA Publication Manual does not address outline formatting at all.

A very different style recommended by The Chicago Manual of Style, based on the practice of the United States Congress in drafting legislation, suggests the following sequence, from the top to the seventh level (the only ones specified): I. A. 1. a) (1) (a) i) – capital Roman numerals with a period, capital letters with a period, Arabic numerals with a period, italic lowercase letters with a single parenthesis, Arabic numerals with a double parenthesis, italic lowercase letters with a double parenthesis, and italic lowercase Roman numerals with a single parentheses, though the italics are not required). Because of its use in the US Code and other US law books, many American lawyers consequently use this outline format.

Another alternative scheme repeats all five levels with a single parenthesis for the second five – I) A) 1) a) i) – and then again with a double parenthesis for the third five – (I) (A) (1) (a) (i).

Many oft-cited style guides besides the APA Publication Manual, including the AP Stylebook, the NYT Manual, Fowler, The Guardian Style Guide, and Strunk & White, are silent on the topic.

One side effect of the use of both Roman numerals and uppercase letters in all of these styles of outlining is that in most alphabets, "I." may be an item at both the top (A-head) and second (B-head) levels. This is usually not problematic because lower level items are usually referred to hierarchically. For example, the third sub-sub-item of the fourth sub-item of the second item is item II. D. 3. So, the ninth sub-item (letter-I) of the first item (Roman-I) is item I. I., and only the top level one is item I.

==== Decimal outline ====
The decimal outline format has the advantage of showing how every item at every level relates to the whole, as shown in the following sample outline:

Thesis statement: ---

1.0 Introduction

1.1 Brief history of Liz Claiborne
1.2 Corporate environment

2.0 Career opportunities

2.1 Operations management

2.1.1 Traffic
2.1.2 International trade and corporate customs
2.1.3 Distribution

2.2 Product development

A first subsection may be numbered 0 rather than 1 (as in 2.0 Career opportunities) if it is an introduction or similar to the following subsections.

ISO 2145 describes a standard for decimal outlines.

=== By specialized purpose ===
Special types of outlines include reverse outlines and integrated outlines.

==== Reverse outline ====
A reverse outline is an outline made from an existing work. Reverse outlining is like reverse engineering a document. The points or topics are extracted from the work, and are arranged in their order of presentation, by section, in the outline. Once completed, the outline can be filled in and rearranged as a plan for a new improved version of the document.

==== Integrated outline ====
An integrated outline is a helpful step in the process of organizing and writing a scholarly paper (literature review, research paper, thesis or dissertation). When completed the integrated outline contains the relevant scholarly sources (author's last name, publication year, page number if quote) for each section in the outline. An integrated outline is generally prepared after the scholar has collected, read and mastered the literature that will be used in the research paper. Shields and Rangarajan (2013) recommend that new scholars develop a system to do this. Part of the system should contain a systematic way to take notes on the scholarly sources. These notes can then be tied to the paper through the integrated outline. This way the scholar reviews all of the literature before the writing begins.

An integrated outline can be a helpful tool for people with writer's block because the content of the paper is organized and identified prior to writing. The structure and content is combined and the author can write a small section at a time. The process is less overwhelming because it can be separated into manageable chunks. The first draft can be written using smaller blocks of time.

== Applications ==
Outlines are used for composition, summarization, and as a development and storage medium.

=== Composition ===
Merriam-Webster's manual for writers and editors (1998, p. 290) recommends that the section headings of an article should when read in isolation, combine to form an outline of the article content. Garson (2002) distinguishes a 'standard outline', presented as a regular table of contents from a refined tree-like 'hierarchical outline', stating that "such an outline might be appropriate, for instance, when the purpose is taxonomic (placing observed phenomena into an exhaustive set of categories). ... hierarchical outlines are rare in quantitative writing, and the researcher is well advised to stick to the standard outline unless there are compelling reasons not to."

Writers of fiction and creative nonfiction, such as Jon Franklin, may use outlines to establish plot sequence, character development and dramatic flow of a story, sometimes in conjunction with free writing.

Preparation of an outline is an intermediate step in the process of writing a scholarly research paper, literature review, thesis or dissertation. A special kind of outline (integrated outline) incorporates scholarly sources into the outline before the writing begins.

=== Summarization ===
In addition to being used as a composition tool during the drafting process, outlines can also be used as a publishing format. Outlines can be presented as a work's table of contents, but they can also be used as the body of a work. The Outline of Knowledge from the 15th edition of the Encyclopedia Britannica is an example of this. Wikipedia includes outlines that summarize subjects (for example, see Outline of chess, Outline of Mars, and Outline of knowledge).

Professors often hand out to their students at the beginning of a term, a summary of the subjects to be covered throughout the course in the form of a topic outline. It may also be included as part of a larger course synopsis.

Outlines are also used to summarize talking points for a speech or lecture.

=== Personal information management ===
Outlines, especially those used within an outliner, can be used for planning, scheduling, and recording.

== Outliners ==
An outliner (or "outline processor") is a specialized type of word processor used to view, create, build, modify, and maintain outlines. It is a computer program, or part of one, used for displaying, organizing, and editing hierarchically arranged text in an outline's tree structure. Textual information is contained in discrete sections called "nodes", which are arranged according to their topic-subtopic (parent-child) relationships, sort of like the members of a family tree. When loaded into an outliner, an outline may be collapsed or expanded to display as few or as many levels as desired.

Outliners are used for storing and retrieving textual information, with terms, phrases, sentences, or paragraphs attached to a tree. So rather than being arranged by document, information is arranged by topic or content. An outline in an outliner may contain as many topics as desired. This eliminates the need to have separate documents, as outlines easily include other outlines just by adding to the tree.

The main difference between a hand-written outline and a digital one, is that the former is usually limited to a summary or blueprint of a planned document, while the latter may easily include all of the content of the entire document and many more. In other words, as a hand-written work an outline is a writing tool, but on a computer, it is a general purpose format supported by a robust development and display medium capable of handling knowledge from its creation to its end use.

Outliners may be used in content creation instead of general word processors for capturing, organizing, editing, and displaying knowledge or general textual information. Outliners are ideal for managing lists, organizing facts and ideas, and for writing computer programs. They are also used for goal and task management (including personal information management and project management), and for writing books and movie scripts.

The graphical counterpart to outliners are mind mappers.

== See also ==
- Abstract (summary)
- Concept map
- Hierarchy
- Mind map
- Outline of knowledge
- Outliner (software used to create outlines)
- Syllabus
  - eSyllabus
- Topic Map
- Tree structure
