= Habitability, Brine Irradiation and Temperature =

- Operator: ESA/Roscosmos
- Manufacturer: Omnisys Instruments AB
- Instrument type: Technology demonstration for IRSU
- Function: Habitability assessment, and harvest atmospheric water on Mars
- Mission duration: Planned: ≥ 1 Earth year

Host spacecraft
- Spacecraft: Kazachok
- Operator: ESA & Roscosmos
- Launch date: 2028
- Rocket: Proton-M/Briz-M
- Launch site: Baikonur

Habitability, Brine Irradiation and Temperature (HABIT) is an instrument designed to harvest water from the Mars atmosphere, an experiment that might pave the way to future water farms on Mars. As part of ESA's ExoMars-2 mission, the instrument was planned to be placed on board the Kazachok lander. The launch of ExoMars-2 has been postponed to 2028.

== Instrument description ==
HABIT is composed of two major components: BOTTLE (Brine Observation Transition to Liquid Experiment) and ENVPACK (Environmental Package). BOTTLE contains six containers protected by HEPA filters, filled with salts that will collect atmospheric water through deliquescence. Sensors in each container will measure hydration and a state in which brine formed. Salts in the instrument can be dehydrated to allow indefinite operations of the instrument.

ENVPACK will contain instruments measuring ultraviolet irradiance, ground temperature, and a temperature of the atmosphere in three different directions. Most of the ENVPACK instruments were already used in Rover Environmental Monitoring Station of the NASA's Curiosity rover. The Principal Investigator of HABIT is Javier Martin-Torres.

== Scientific objectives ==
The objectives of HABIT are:

- to investigate (and quantify) the habitability of the landing site in terms of availability of water, ultraviolet radiation, and temperature ranges
- to investigate the atmosphere/regolith water interchange, the subsurface hydration, as well as the ozone, water and dust atmospheric cycle, and the convective activity of the boundary layer
- to demonstrate an in situ resource utilization technology for future Mars exploration

The HABIT instrument will use salts to absorb 5 millilitres of water from the atmosphere each day, and can hold 25 mL in total. If the process works as expected, the technology could be scaled up to provide water for future crewed missions.
