= Dynamic Albedo of Neutrons =

Detector on the Curiosity rover

Dynamic Albedo of Neutrons (DAN)
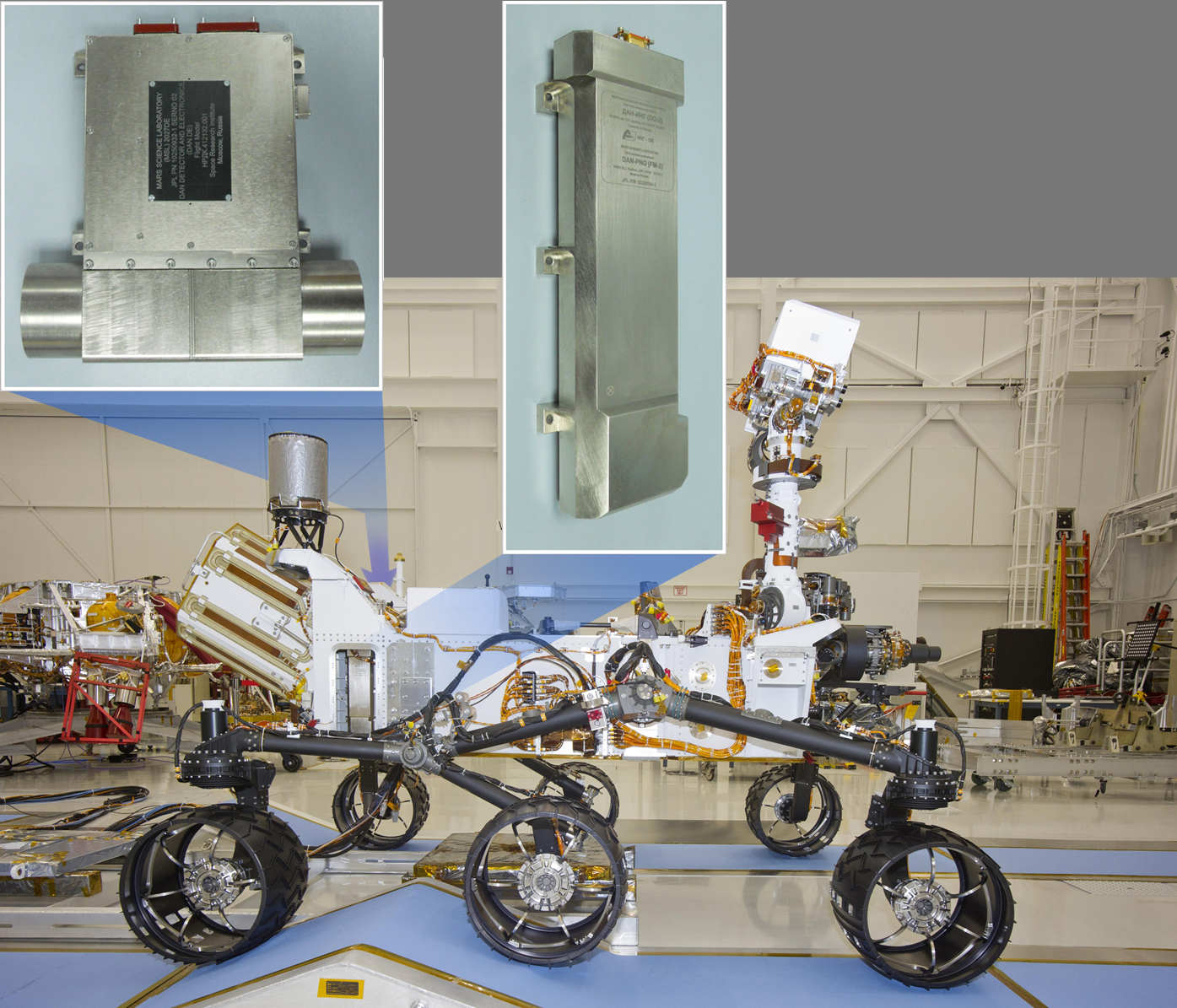
- DAN instrument on the Curiosity rover
- Operator: NASA
- Manufacturer: Russian Space Research Institute (IKI)
- Instrument type: neutron spectrometer
- Function: hydrogen and H_{2}O detector
- Mission duration: Primary: 668 sols (687 days); Current: 4670 sols (4797 days) since landing
- Began operations: August 6, 2012
- Website: msl-scicorner.jpl.nasa.gov/Instruments/DAN/

Host spacecraft
- Spacecraft: Curiosity rover
- Operator: NASA
- Launch date: November 26, 2011, 15:02:00 UTC
- Launch site: Cape Canaveral LC-41
- COSPAR ID: 2011-070A

The Dynamic Albedo of Neutrons (DAN) instrument is an experiment mounted on the Mars Science Laboratory's Curiosity rover. It is a pulsed sealed-tube neutron source and detector used to measure hydrogen or ice and water at or near the Martian surface. The instrument consists of the detector element (DE) and a 14.1 MeV pulsing neutron generator (PNG). The die-away time of neutrons is measured by the DE after each neutron pulse from the PNG. DAN was provided by the Russian Federal Space Agency, funded by Russia and is under the leadership of Principal Investigator Igor Mitrofanov.

== History ==
On August 18, 2012 (sol 13), DAN was turned on, marking the success of a Russian-American collaboration on the surface of Mars and the first working Russian science instrument on the Martian surface since Mars 3 stopped transmitting over forty years ago. The instrument is designed to detect subsurface water.

On March 18, 2013 (sol 219), NASA reported evidence of mineral hydration, likely hydrated calcium sulfate, in several rock samples including the broken fragments of "Tintina" rock and "Sutton Inlier" rock as well as in veins and nodules in other rocks like "Knorr" rock and "Wernicke" rock. Analysis using the rover's DAN instrument provided evidence of subsurface water, amounting to as much as 4% water content, down to a depth of 60 cm (2.0 ft), in the rover's traverse from the Bradbury Landing site to the Yellowknife Bay area in the Glenelg terrain.

Curiosity rover - How DAN works to detect water molecules - Actual Results

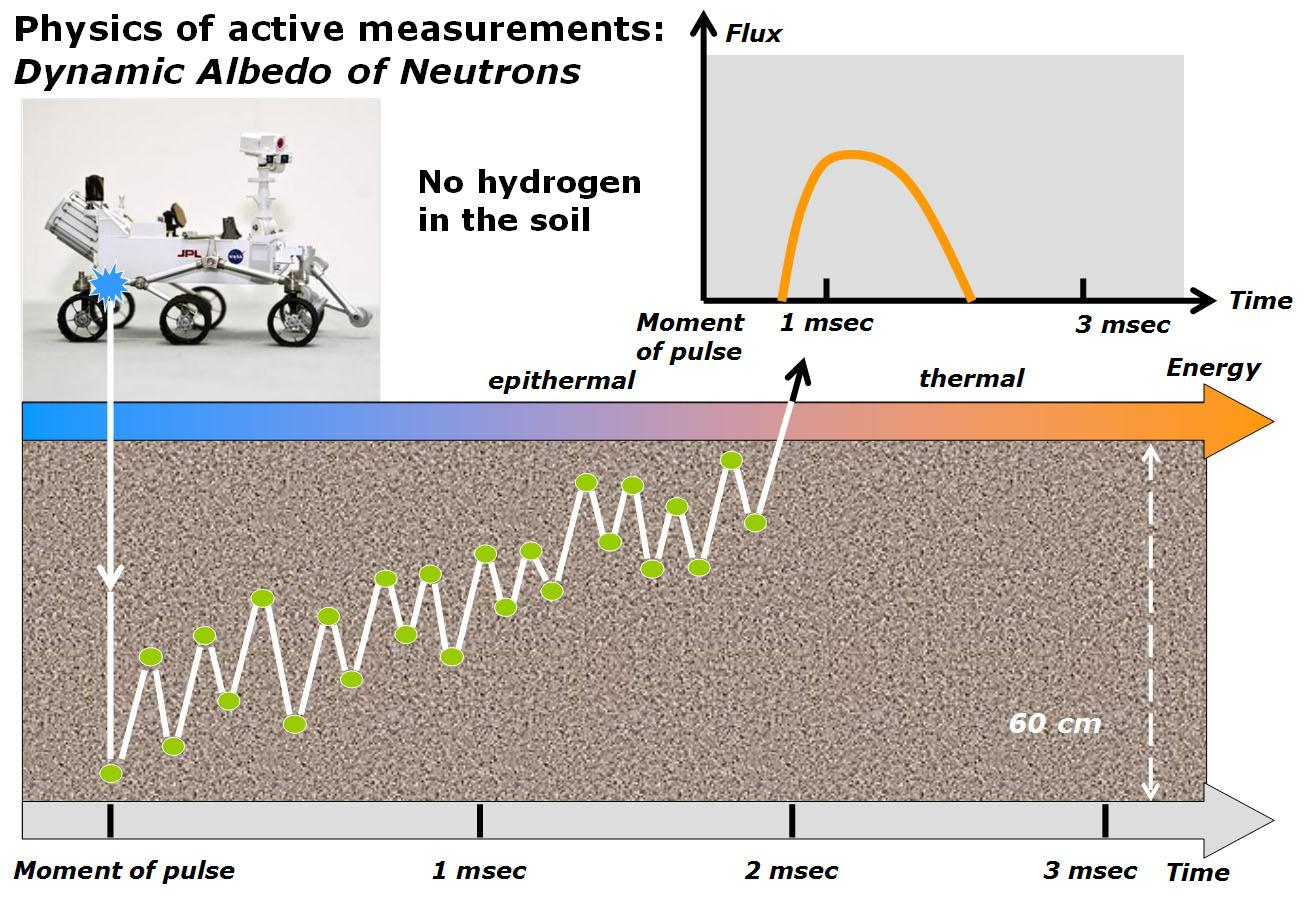
No Water present

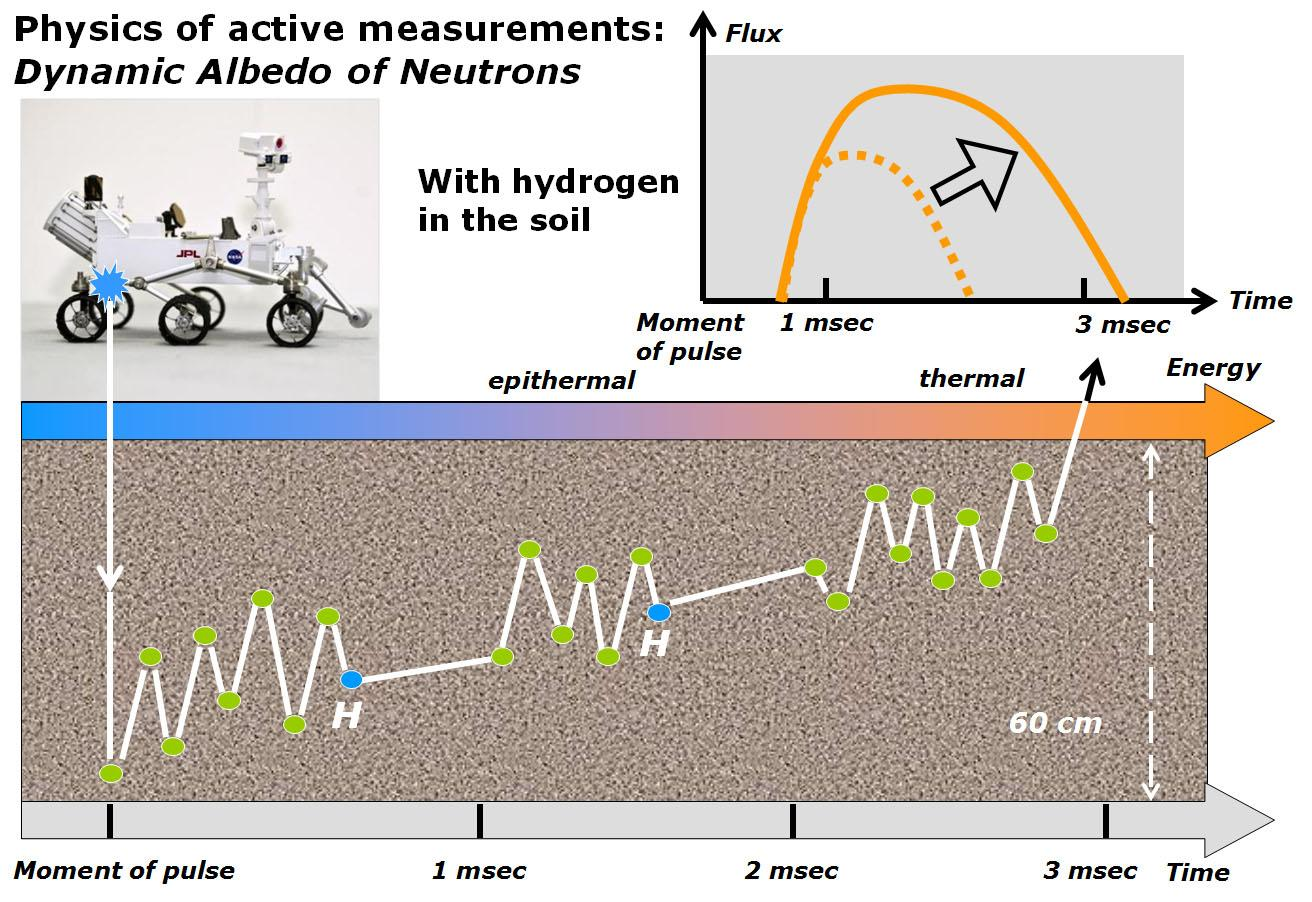
Water present

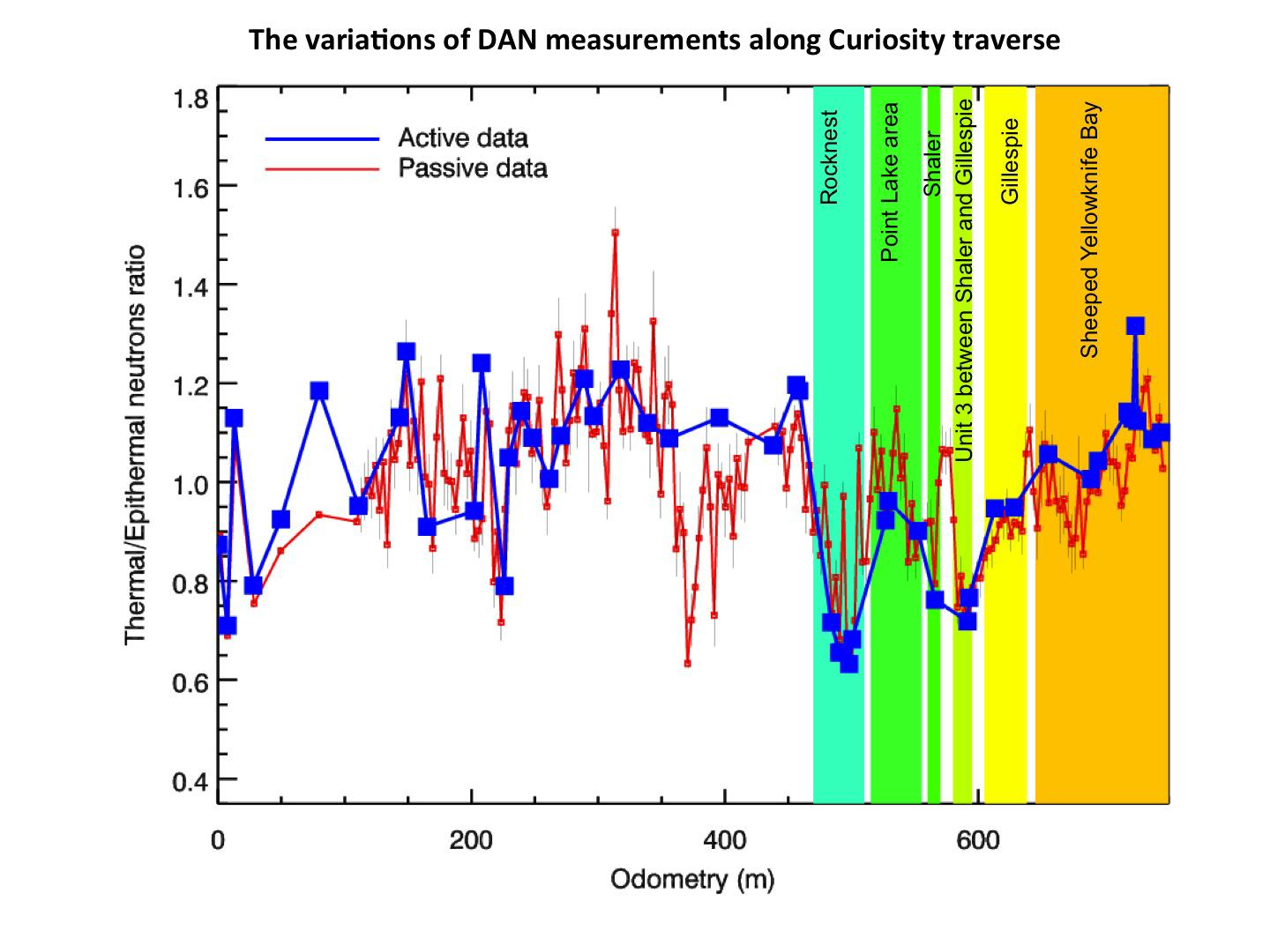
Actual Results - From Bradbury Landing to Glenelg (August 2012 - March 2013).

2 million pulses fired (January 29, 2014).

On August 19, 2015, NASA scientists reported that the DAN instrument on Curiosity detected an unusual hydrogen-rich area, at "Marias Pass," on Mars. The hydrogen found seemed related to water or hydroxyl ions in rocks within 3 feet (0.91 m) beneath the rover, according to the scientists.

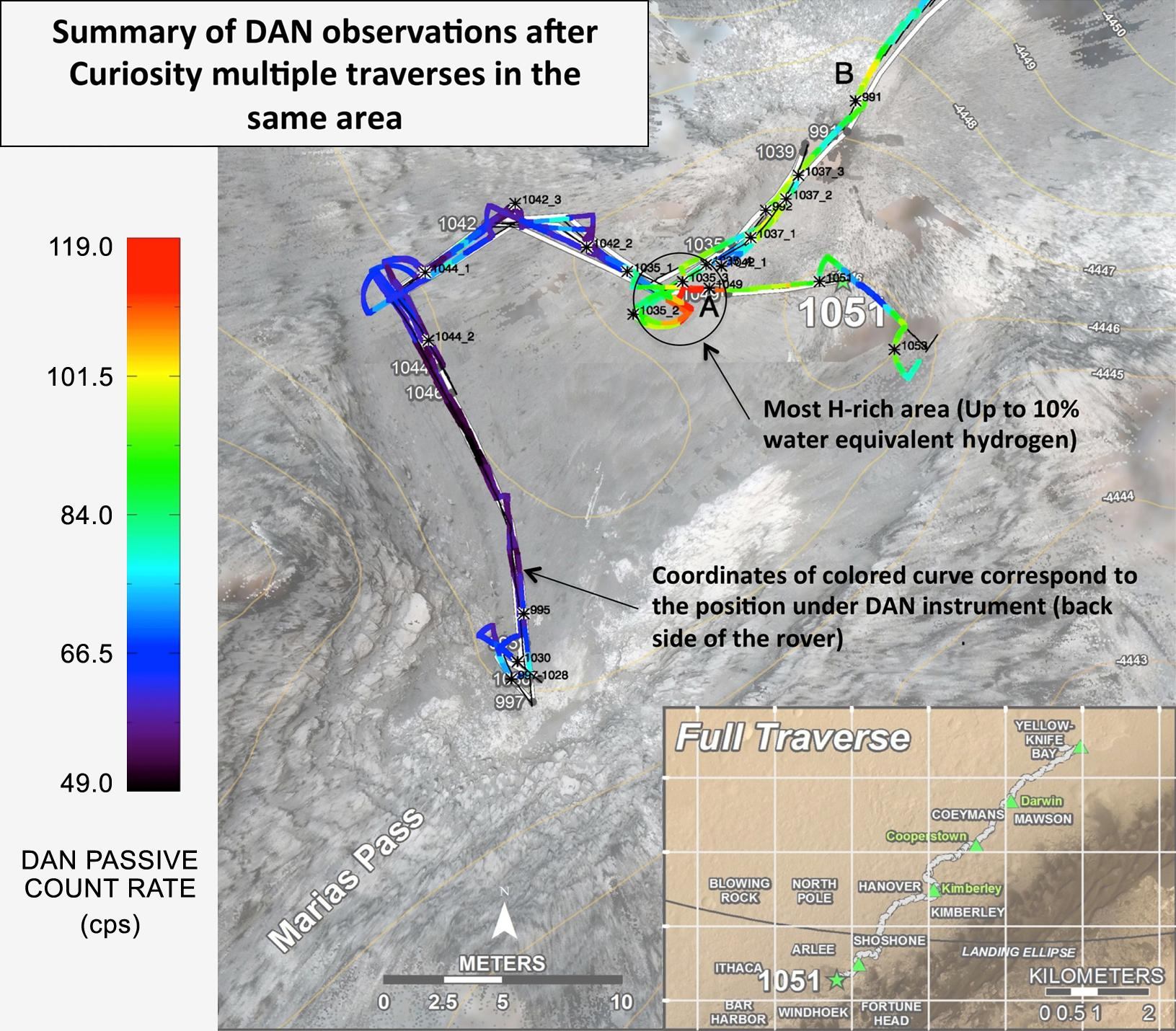
Hydrogen-rich area detected at 'Marias Pass" on Mars by Curiosity.

== See also ==
- Exploration of Mars
- Groundwater on Mars
- Timeline of Mars Science Laboratory
- Water on Mars
