= Rotation and Interior Structure Experiment =

Mars radio science experiment

RISE (Rotation and Interior Structure Experiment)
- Operator: NASA / JPL
- Manufacturer: JPL
- Instrument type: Radio science
- Function: Constrain the core of Mars
- Mission duration: 2 years
- Began operations: Landing: 26 November 2018
- Website: mars.nasa.gov/insight/spacecraft/instruments/rise/

Properties
- Mass: 7.3 kg (16 lb)
- Dimensions: 19.8 L^{3}
- Power consumption: 78 W
- Spectral band: X band

Host spacecraft
- Spacecraft: InSight Mars lander
- Operator: NASA
- Launch date: 5 May 2018
- Rocket: Atlas V 401
- Launch site: Vandenberg SLC-3E
- COSPAR ID: 2018-042A

Rotation and Interior Structure Experiment (RISE) is a radio science experiment onboard InSight Mars lander that will use the spacecraft communication system to provide precise measurements of Mars' rotation and wobble. RISE precisely tracks the location of the lander to measure how much Mars's axis wobbles as it orbits the Sun. These observations will provide new constraints on the core radius and help determine whether the core of Mars is mostly liquid, and which other elements, besides iron, may be present. This study will also help scientists understand why Mars's magnetic field is so weak, as compared to Earth's.

The mission launched on 5 May 2018 and landed on the surface of Mars at Elysium Planitia on 26 November 2018.

== Overview ==
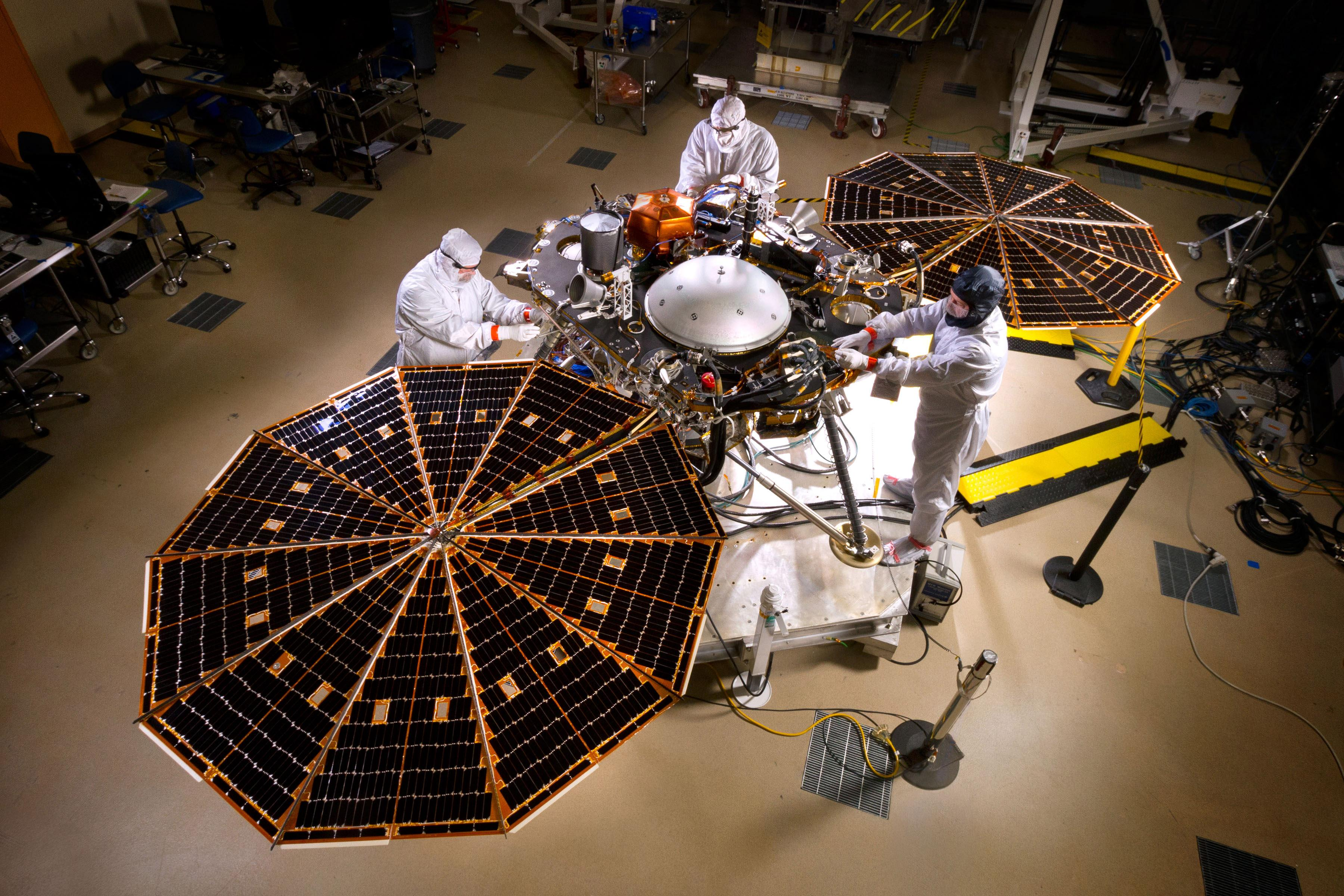
The Insight lander with its solar panels deployed in a cleanroom

The Principal Investigator for RISE is William Folkner of JPL, who led the 1997 investigation of Mars's core using the radio link between Earth and NASA's Mars Pathfinder. RISE uses the spacecraft's radio connection with Earth to assess perturbations of Mars's rotation axis to within 10 centimeters. These measurements can provide information about the size and composition of Mars's core.

The radio science equipment is largely the same as used for the Mars Exploration Rover mission, and it includes two medium-gain horn antennas (MGAs) on the lander deck, and an X band radio transponder (8 GHz) and transmitter inside the lander, where electronics can be shielded from the harsh conditions of space. Although the lander will communicate all other science data in UHF to relay orbiters, the X band can be used directly with Earth in case of some problems with relay through an orbiter.

In principle, after InSight lands on Mars, the lander reflects a signal sent from Earth, revealing its exact location and velocity in space. In doing so, the experiment measures changes in the signal, known as the Doppler effect as Mars -and the lander on it- move around the Sun. Scientists can use this information to understand how much Mars wobbles in its orbit, which relates to the nature of its iron-rich core. A planet with a liquid core will wobble more as it spins, compared to one that is solid at its core.

The sensitivity is such that RISE can also detect the rotation changes caused by the seasonal redistribution of carbon dioxide (CO_{2}) ice as it sublimates in the summer and condenses at the poles, causing tiny changes in the rotation rate of Mars, translating into a variation in the length of its days.

== Objectives ==
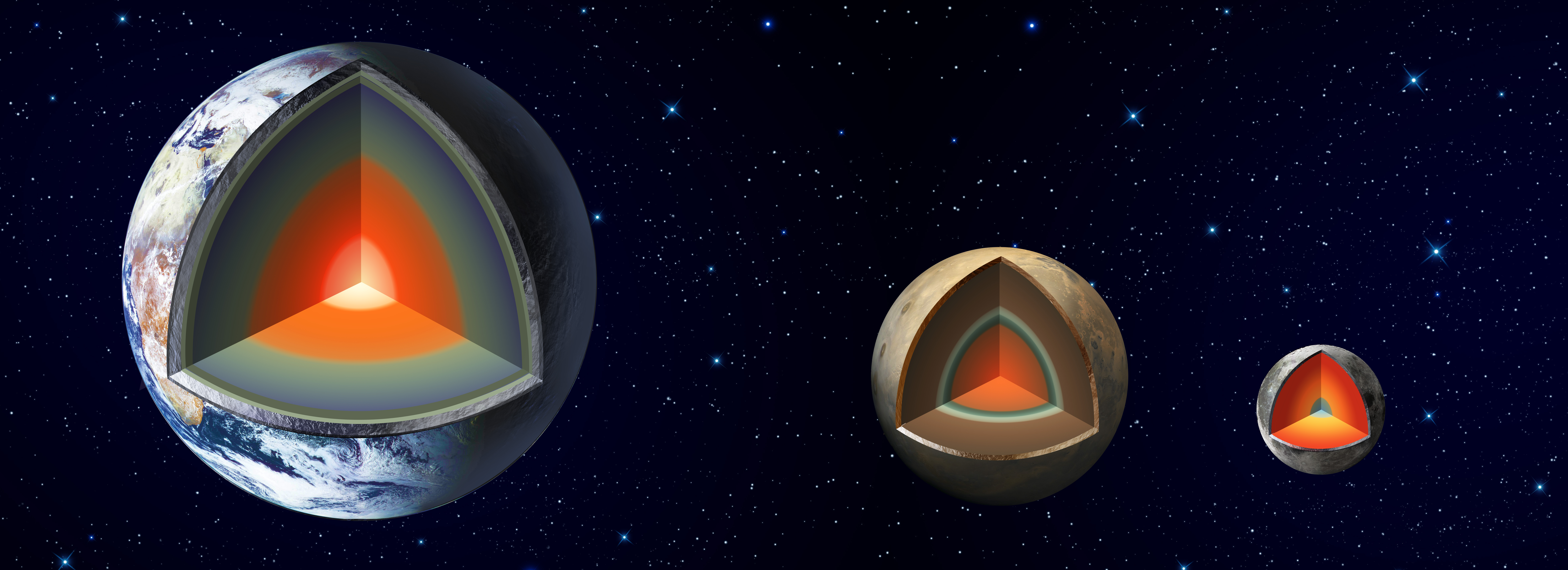
Interiors of Earth, Mars and the Moon (artist concept)

The goals of the RISE experiment are to deduce the size and density of the Martian core through estimation of the precession and nutation of the spin axis. The precession and nutation estimates will be based on measurements of the relative velocity of the InSight lander and tracking stations on Earth known as the Deep Space Network.

The perturbations resemble the wobble of a spinning top and occur on two time scales. The longer wobble, called precession, takes about 165,000 years and it is directly related to the mass and diameter of the iron-rich core. The shorter-period wobbles, called nutations, occur on time scales of less than a year and are extremely small. Since they are determined by the density of the core, they will help determine if the core is mostly liquid or solid. This study will also help scientists understand why Mars's magnetic field is so weak, as compared to Earth's.

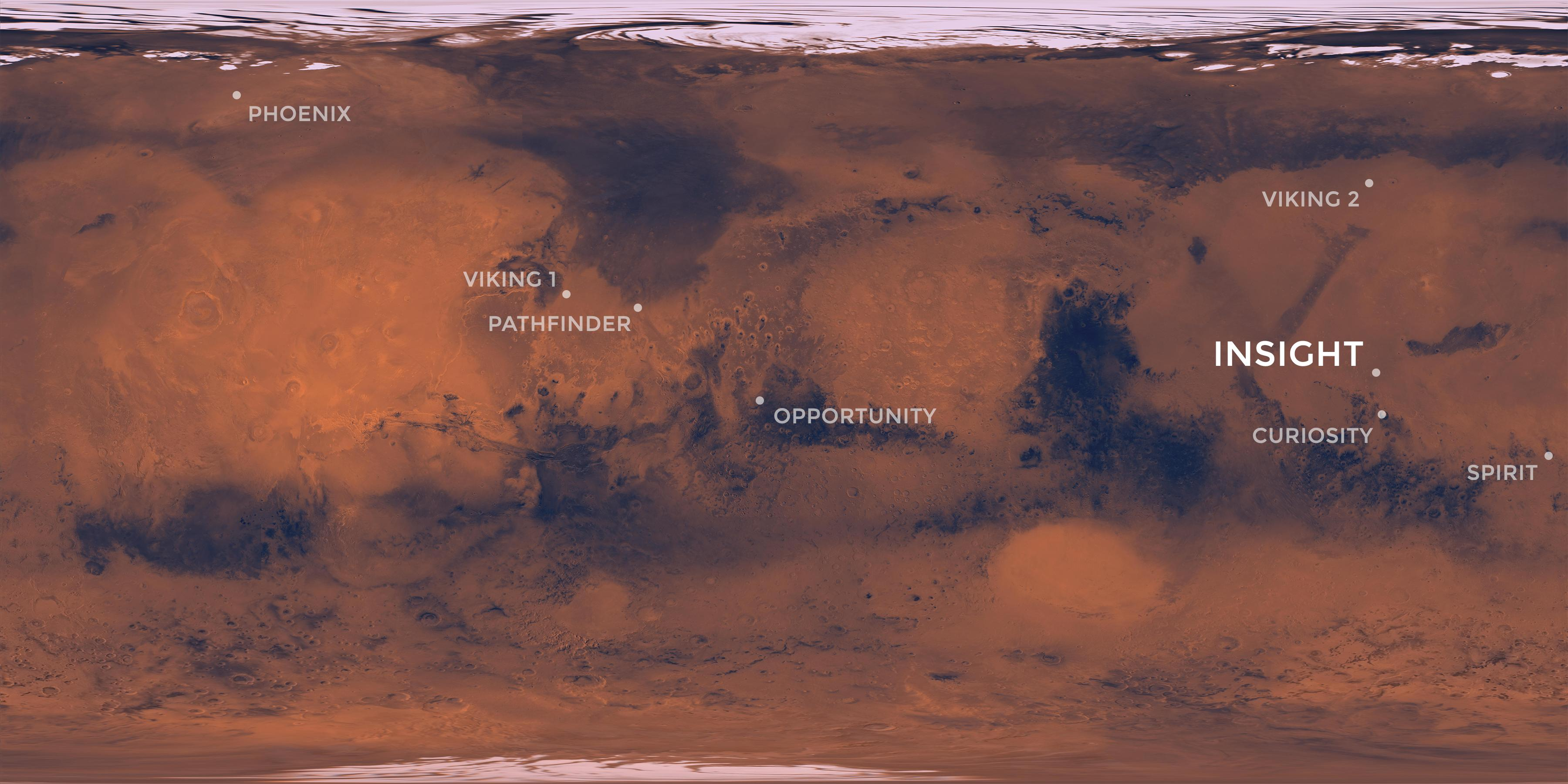
InSight landing zone target with other NASA landing zones

== See also ==
- LaRa, a similar radio science experiment on the ExoMars lander
