= Martian surface =

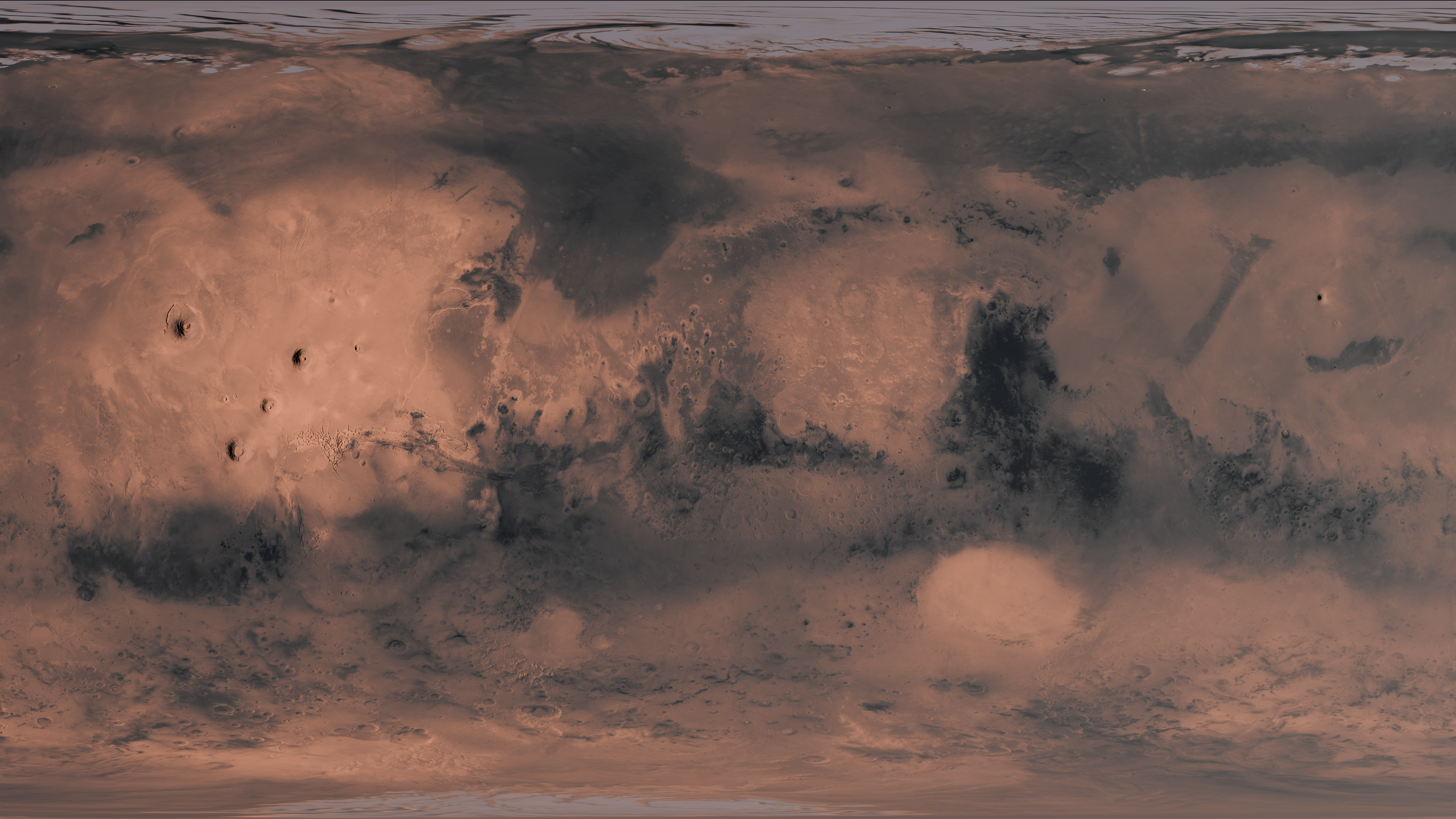
Mars surface map rendered using a color map and a heightmap from NASA

The study of surface characteristics (or surface properties and processes) is a broad category of Mars science that examines the nature of the materials making up the Martian surface. The study evolved from telescopic and remote-sensing techniques developed by astronomers to study planetary surfaces. However, it has increasingly become a subdiscipline of geology as automated spacecraft bring ever-improving resolution and instrument capabilities. By using characteristics such as color, albedo, and thermal inertia and analytical tools such as reflectance spectroscopy and radar, scientists are able to study the chemistry and physical makeup (e.g., grain sizes, surface roughness, and rock abundances) of the Martian surface. The resulting data help scientists understand the planet's mineral composition and the nature of geological processes operating on the surface. Mars's surface layer represents a tiny fraction of the total volume of the planet, yet plays a significant role in the planet's geologic history. Understanding physical surface properties is also very important in determining safe landing sites for spacecraft.

== Albedo and color ==
Mars 360 animation

Like all planets, Mars reflects a portion of the light it receives from the sun. The fraction of sunlight reflected is a quantity called albedo, which ranges from 0 for a body that reflects no sunlight to 1.0 for a body that reflects all sunlight. Different parts of a planet's surface (and atmosphere) have different albedo values depending on the chemical and physical nature of the surface.

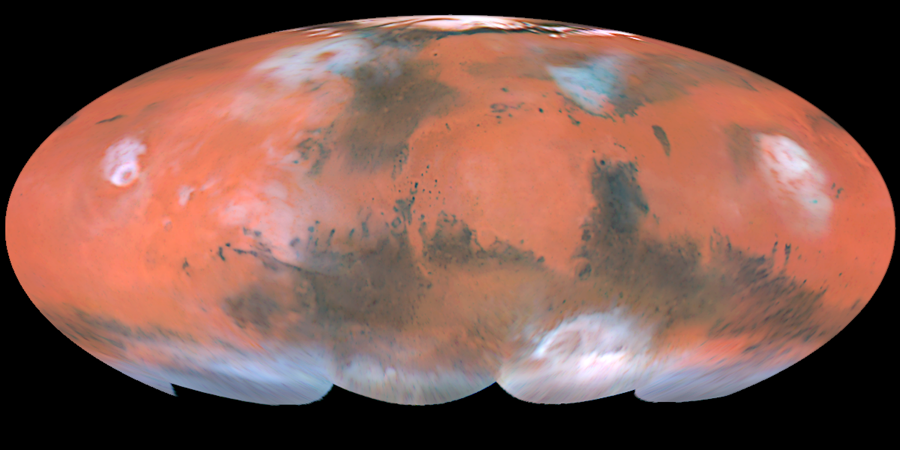
Mollweide projection of albedo features on Mars from Hubble Space Telescope. Bright ochre areas in left, center, and right are Tharsis, Arabia, and Elysium, respectively. The dark region at top center left is Acidalium Planitia. Syrtis Major is the dark area projecting upward in the center right. Note orographic clouds over Olympus and Elysium Montes (left and right, respectively).

No topography is visible on Mars from Earth-based telescopes. The bright areas and dark markings on pre-spaceflight-era maps of Mars are all albedo features. (See Classical albedo features on Mars.) They have little relation to topography. Dark markings are most distinct in a broad belt from 0° to 40° S latitude. However, the most prominent dark marking, Syrtis Major Planum, is in the northern hemisphere, outside this belt. The classical albedo feature Mare Acidalium (Acidalia Planitia) is another prominent dark area that lies north of the main belt. Bright areas, excluding the polar caps and transient clouds, include Hellas, Tharsis, and Arabia Terra. The bright areas are now known to be locations where fine dust covers the surface. The dark markings represent areas that the wind has swept clean of dust, leaving behind a lag of dark, rocky material. The dark color is consistent with the presence of mafic rocks, such as basalt.

The albedo of a surface usually varies with the wavelength of light hitting it. Mars reflects little light at the blue end of the spectrum but much at red and higher wavelengths. This is why Mars has the familiar reddish-orange color to the naked eye. But detailed observations reveal a subtle range of colors on Mars's surface. Color variations provide clues to the composition of surface materials. The bright areas are reddish-ochre in color, and the dark areas appear dark gray. A third type of area, intermediate in color and albedo, is also present and thought to represent regions containing a mixture of the material from the bright and dark areas. The dark gray areas can be further subdivided into those that are more reddish and those less reddish in hue.

== Reflectance spectroscopy ==
Reflectance spectroscopy is a technique that measures the amount of sunlight absorbed or reflected by the Martian surface at specific wavelengths. The spectra represent mixtures of spectra from individual minerals on the surface along with contributions from absorption lines in the solar spectrum and the Martian atmosphere. By separating out (“deconvolving”) each of these contributions, scientists can compare the resulting spectra to laboratory spectra of known minerals to determine the probable identity and abundance of individual minerals on the surface.

Using this technique, scientists have long known that the bright ochre areas probably contain abundant ferric iron (Fe^{3+}) oxides typical of weathered iron-bearing materials (e.g., rust). Spectra of the dark areas are consistent with the presence of ferrous iron (Fe^{2+}) in mafic minerals and show absorption bands suggestive of pyroxene, a group of minerals that is very common in basalt. Spectra of the redder dark areas are consistent with mafic materials covered with thin alteration coatings.

== Thermal inertia ==
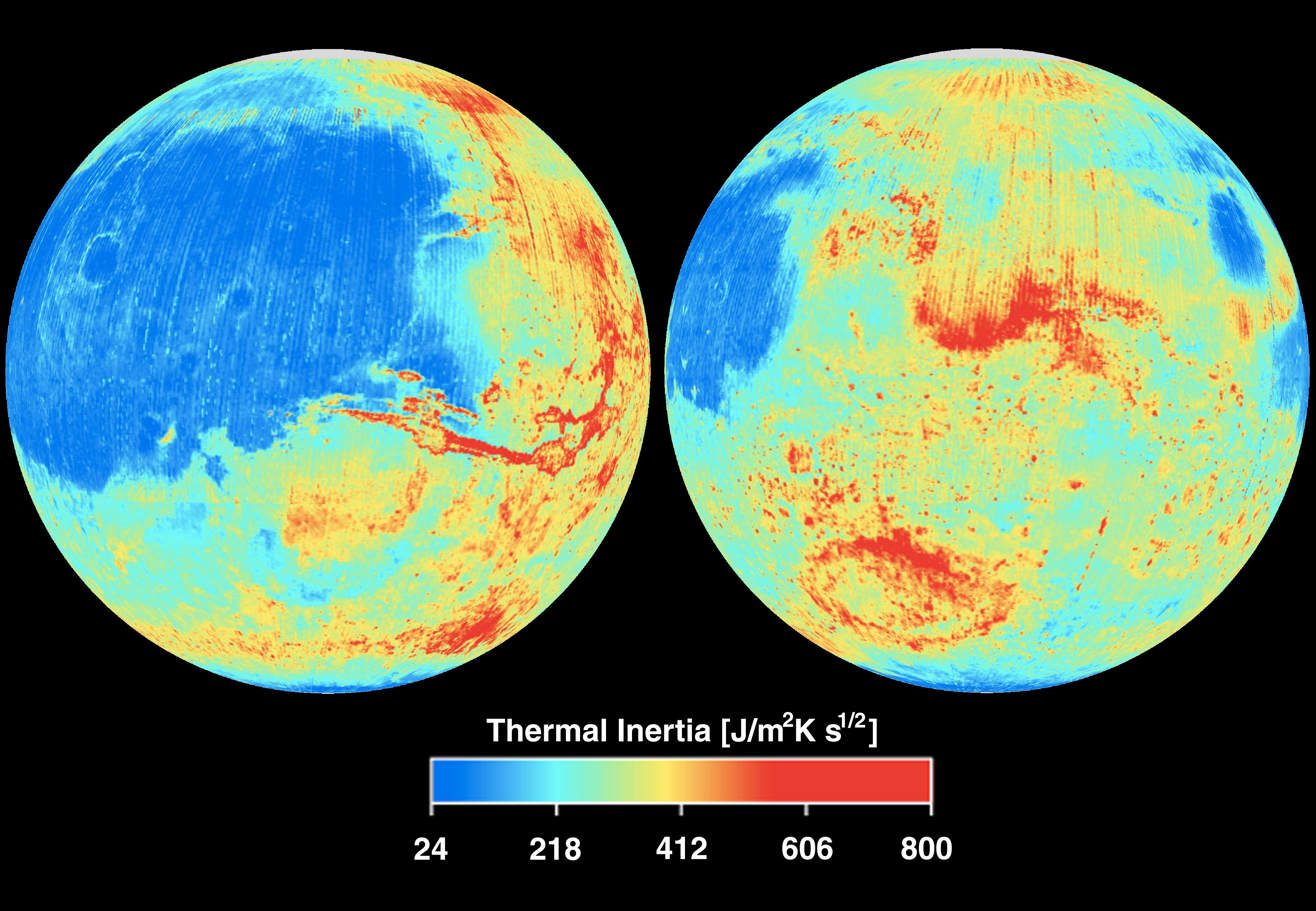
Global thermal inertia based on data from Thermal Emission Spectrometer (TES) on Mars Global Surveyor spacecraft.

Thermal inertia measurement is a remote-sensing technique that allows scientists to distinguish fine-grained from coarse-grained areas on the Martian surface. Thermal inertia is a measure of how fast or slow something heats up or cools off. For example, metals have very low thermal inertia. An aluminum cookie sheet taken out of an oven is cool to the touch in less than a minute; while a ceramic plate (high thermal inertia) taken from the same oven takes much longer to cool off.

Scientists can estimate the thermal inertia on the Martian surface by measuring variations in surface temperature with respect to time of day and fitting this data to numerical temperature models. The thermal inertia of a material is directly related to its thermal conductivity, density, and specific heat capacity. Rocky materials do not vary much in density and specific heat, so variations in thermal inertia are mainly due to variations in thermal conductivity. Solid rock surfaces, such as outcroppings, have high thermal conductivities and inertias. Dust and small granular material in the regolith have low thermal inertias because the void spaces between grains restrict thermal conductivity to the contact point between grains.

Thermal inertia values for most of the Martian surface are inversely related to albedo. Thus, high albedo areas have low thermal inertias indicating surfaces that are covered with dust and other fine granular material. The dark gray, low albedo surfaces have high thermal inertias more typical of consolidated rock. However, thermal inertia values are not high enough to indicate widespread outcroppings are common on Mars. Even the rockier areas appear to be mixed with a significant amount of loose material. Data from the Infrared Thermal Mapping (IRTM) experiment on the Viking orbiters identified areas of high thermal inertia throughout the interior of Valles Marineris and the chaotic terrain, suggesting that these areas contain a relatively large number of blocks and boulders.

== Radar investigations ==
Radar studies provide a wealth of data on elevations, slopes, textures, and material properties of the Martian surface. Mars is an inviting target for Earth-based radar investigations because of its relative proximity to Earth and its favorable orbital and rotational characteristics that allow good coverage over wide areas of the planet's surface. Radar echoes from Mars were first obtained in the early 1960s, and the technique has been vital in finding safe terrain for Mars landers.

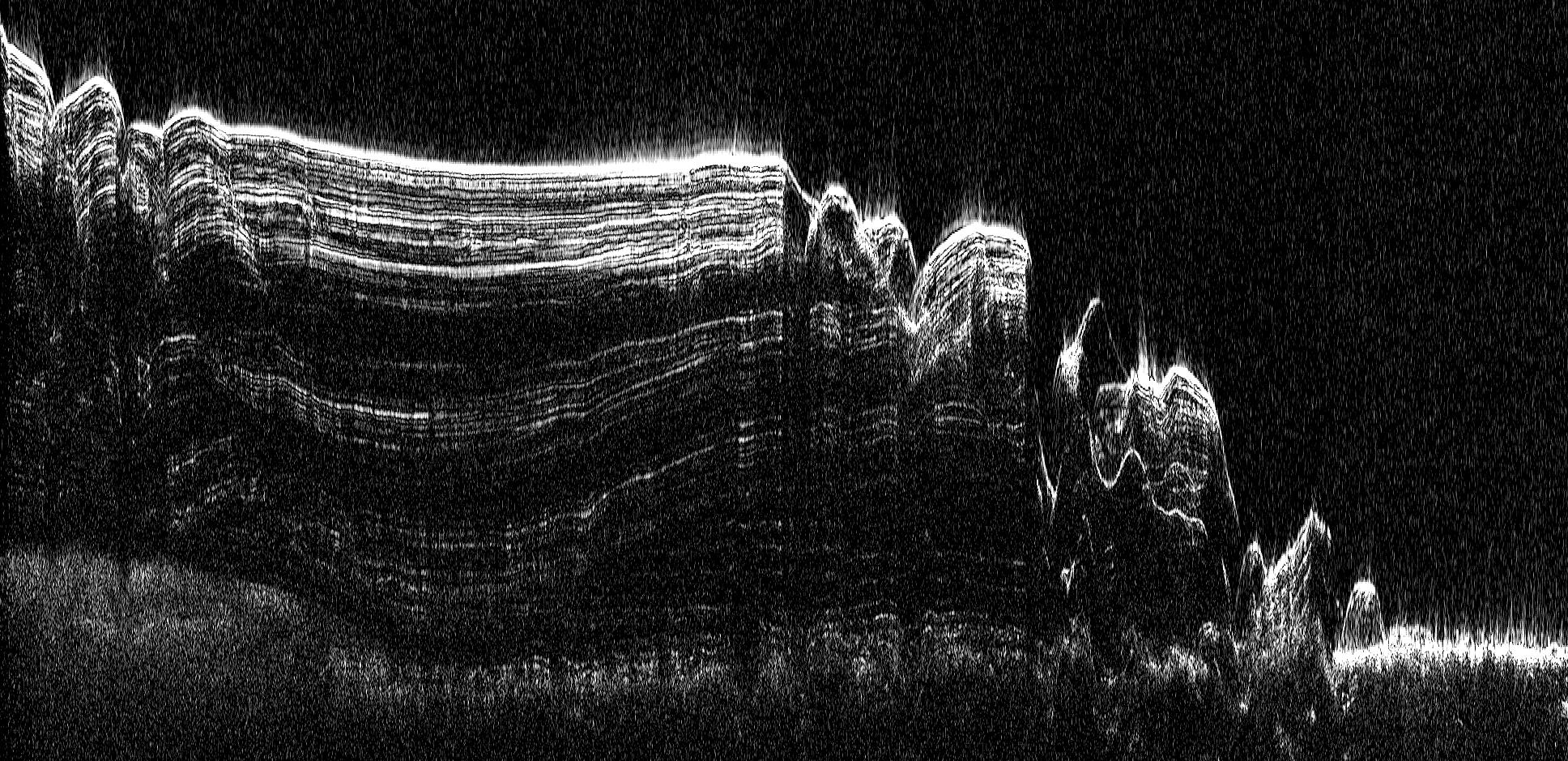
Radargram of north pole layered deposits from SHARAD shallow ground-penetrating radar on Mars Reconnaissance Orbiter.

Dispersion of the returned radar echoes from Mars shows that a lot of variation exists in surface roughness and slope across the planet's surface. Wide areas of the planet, particularly in Syria and Sinai Plana, are relatively smooth and flat. Meridiani Planum, the landing site of the Mars Exploration Rover Opportunity, is one of the flattest and smoothest (at decimeter-scale) locations ever investigated by radar—a fact borne out by surface images at the landing site. Other areas show high levels of roughness in radar that are not discernible in images taken from orbit. The average surface abundance of centimeter- to meter-scale rocks is much greater on Mars than the other terrestrial planets. Tharsis and Elysium, in particular, show a high degree of small-scale surface roughness associated with volcanoes. This extremely rough terrain is suggestive of young, ʻaʻā lava flows. A 200-km-long band of low to zero radar albedo ("stealth" region) cuts across the southwest Tharsis. The region corresponds to the location of the Medusa Fossae Formation, which consists of thick layers of unconsolidated materials, perhaps volcanic ash or loess.

Ground-penetrating radar instruments on the Mars Express orbiter (MARSIS) and the Mars Reconnaissance Orbiter (SHARAD) are currently providing stunning echo-return data on subsurface materials and structures to depths of up to 5 km. Results have shown that the polar layered deposits are composed of almost pure ice, with no more than 10% dust by volume and that fretted valleys in Deuteronilus Mensae contain thick glaciers covered by a mantle of rocky debris.
