= CLUPI =

Camera system on the planned Rosalind Franklin rover

Close-UP Imager (CLUPI)
- Operator: European Space Agency
- Manufacturer: TASiCH
- Instrument type: Visible light camera
- Function: Close-up HD imaging ≥ 7 months
- Began operations: Planned: 2030
- Website: ExoMars Rover Instrument Suite

Properties
- Mass: 932 g
- Dimensions: 170 × 80 × 100 mm
- Power consumption: 15 W

Host spacecraft
- Spacecraft: Rosalind Franklin rover
- Operator: ESA
- Launch date: NET 2028

CLUPI (Close-Up Imager) is a miniaturized camera system on board the planned European Space Agency Rosalind Franklin rover. CLUPI has been designed to acquire high-resolution close-up images in colour of soils, outcrops, rocks, drill fines and drill core samples, as well as and the search for potential biosignature structures and patterns. This camera assembly is part of the science payload on board the rover, tasked to search for biosignatures and biomarkers on Mars. It is planned to be launched not earlier than 2028 and land on Mars in 2029.

== Overview ==
The CLUPI instrument is being developed by a Swiss–French consortium supported by the Swiss Space Office and the French Space Agency (CNES). Its Principal Investigator is Jean-Luc Josset, from the Space Exploration Institute, Neuchatel in Switzerland. Frances Westall and Beda Hofmann are Co-PIs. The science team includes scientists from Canada, Europe and Russia, especially for biosignature recognition. Instrument field tests started in 2009 with preliminary CLUPI systems tested during several Arctic winters.

CLUPI will be mounted on the movable rover's drill box and it will acquire high-resolution, close-up images in colour of the texture, structure and morphology of rocks and soil. The resolution will be similar to what geologists would obtain by using a hand-held magnifying lens: at a distance of 10 cm from the target, the maximum resolution is 7 μm/pixel. Its field of view can be changed by the use of two fixed, flat mirrors (FOV2 and FOV3). The CLUPI visual images will complement those provided by PanCam to provide the context necessary for interpretation of mineralogy and potential visible biosignatures.

CLUPI will observe the drilling area very closely from different angles to help characterise rock structures such as embedded crystals and fractures. After the drill has been used and retracted, CLUPI will be used to image the amount and appearance of dislodged fines. From the high position, the camera will be able to observe the borehole to a depth of approximately 10 cm, depending on the local illumination conditions. Then, CLUPI will be used to image the collected core prior to delivery to the rovers' internal analytical instruments for further processing and analyses.

CLUPI	Performance/units
Detector	Full colour Active Pixel Sensor (APS); 3 colours
Image dimension	2652 × 1768 pixels
Field of view	14°
Image resolution	7 μm/pixel at 10 cm distance, viewed area 1.9 cm × 1.3 cm 39 μm/pixel at 50 cm distance, viewed area 10 cm × 7 cm 79 μm/pixel at 100 cm distance, viewed area 21 cm × 14 cm
Focal length	Variable: 10 cm to infinity Autofocus
Exposure time	≤ 1024 seconds Automatic exposure time.
Spectral range	400 – 700 nm
Mass	932 g
Data storage	4 Gb
Max power consumption	15 W

== See also ==
- Astrobiology
- Life on Mars
- Planetary habitability
