= Rosalind Franklin (rover) =

Planned Mars rover, part of ExoMars programme

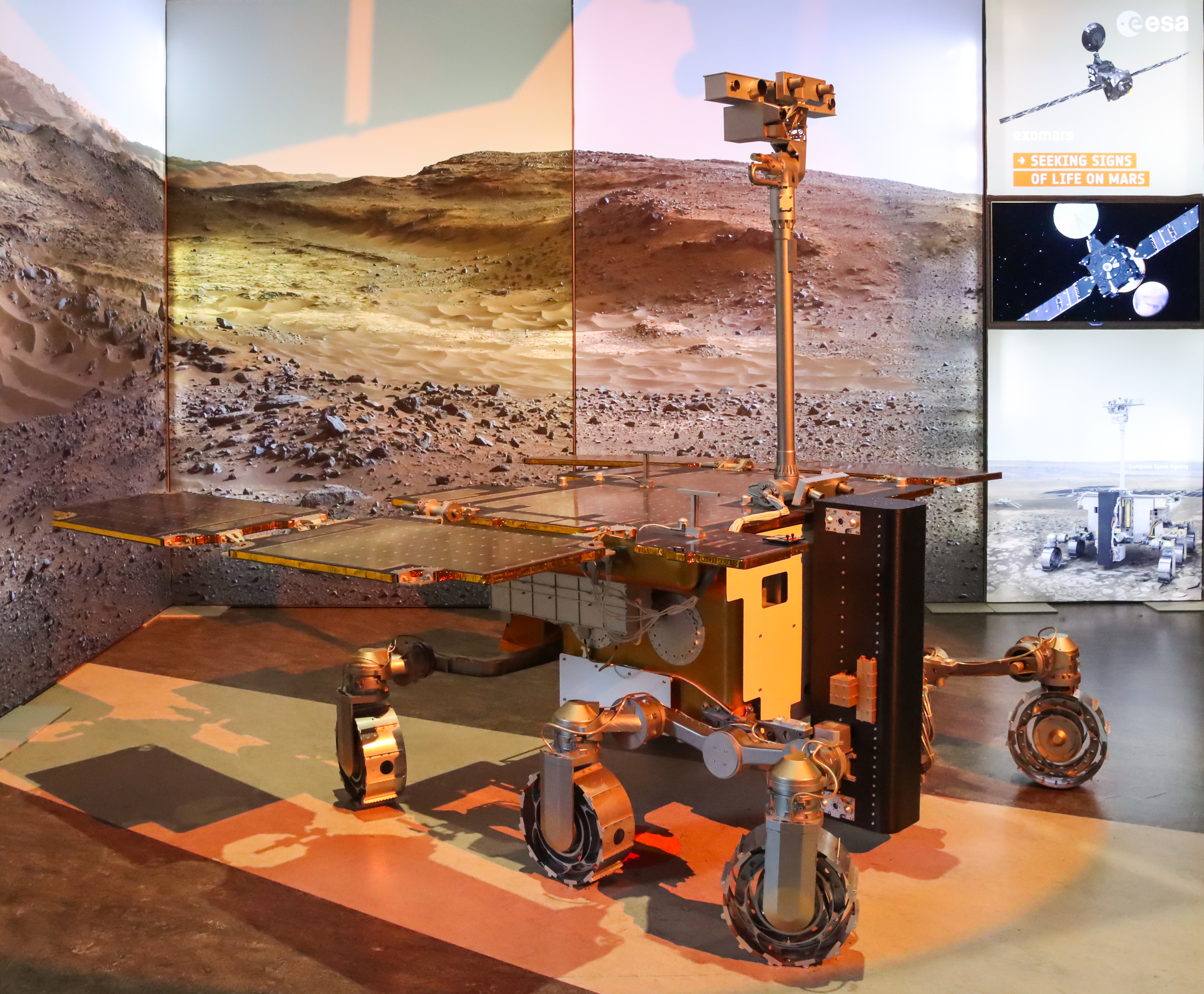
- Rosalind Franklin rover model, 2024
- Mission type: Mars rover
- Operator: ESA
- Website: www.esa.int/...ExoMars
- Mission duration: ≥ 7 months

Spacecraft properties
- Manufacturer: Astrium · Airbus
- Launch mass: 310 kg (680 lb)
- Power: 1200 W·h/d solar array, 1142 W·h Lithium-ion battery

Start of mission
- Launch date: October 2028
- Rocket: Falcon Heavy
- Launch site: Kennedy Space Center Launch Complex 39A
- Contractor: SpaceX

Mars rover
- Landing date: November 2030
- Landing site: Oxia Planum

Rosalind Franklin, previously known as the ExoMars rover, is a planned European robotic Mars rover, part of the international astrobiology programme ExoMars led by the European Space Agency (ESA). The rover is named after Rosalind Franklin, a British chemist and DNA research pioneer. Rosalind Franklin will be the first Mars rover to drill into a depth of up to two metres below the planet's surface. The rover was designed to search for biomolecules or biosignatures from past life. Its core task is to determine whether life ever existed on Mars, or still does today. As of 2026, Rosalind Franklin is expected to launch in 2028 on a Falcon Heavy rocket. The rover, together with the Airbus-built landing platform EDLM, will travel to Mars inside the Descent Module, connected to the Carrier Module. The Trace Gas Orbiter (TGO), launched in 2016, will operate as the data-relay satellite of Rosalind Franklin.

== History ==
=== Overview ===
In mid-2010s, the mission was scheduled to launch in early 2020s in cooperation with the Russian Roscosmos. The Russian invasion of Ukraine in 2022 caused a delay of the programme, as the member states of ESA voted to terminate the cooperation. In 2024, the project received additional funding to restart and complete the mission with launch scheduled for 2028 using a NASA-procured US launch vehicle and a new European landing platform. The landing is expected in 2030.

=== Origins ===
The rover was proposed in 2001 as part of ESA's Aurora Programme based on the astrobiology community's advice published in a 1999 document called the "Red Book". It was originally conceived as a 120 kg (260 lb) rover with a 10 kg (22 lb) science payload, launched in 2009 by a Soyuz-2-1b rocket from Kourou. The Ariane 5 and Proton rockets were also considered after the project was broadened in scope in mid-2000s.

In 2009, ESA reached an agreement with NASA to launch the mission in 2018 together with NASA's MAX-C rover using a US launch vehicle of the Atlas family. However, MAX-C was cancelled in April 2011 due to budget cuts in the US. At that time, the European rover was envisioned as weighing 270 kg (600 lb) and carrying a 14.4 kg (32 lb) science payload.

In 2012, ESA entered negotiations about a new agreement with Roscosmos under which the Russian agency would provide a Proton launch vehicle and develop the descent module and the landing platform for the rover. The agreement was formalised in March 2013. The rover's design reached its final configuration: an autonomous six-wheeled vehicle with mass approximately 300 kg (660 lb), about 60% more than NASA's 2004 Mars Exploration Rovers Spirit and Opportunity, but about one third that of NASA's later rovers: Curiosity, launched in 2011, and Perseverance, launched in 2020. The mission completed its System Requirements Review (SRR) in July 2013

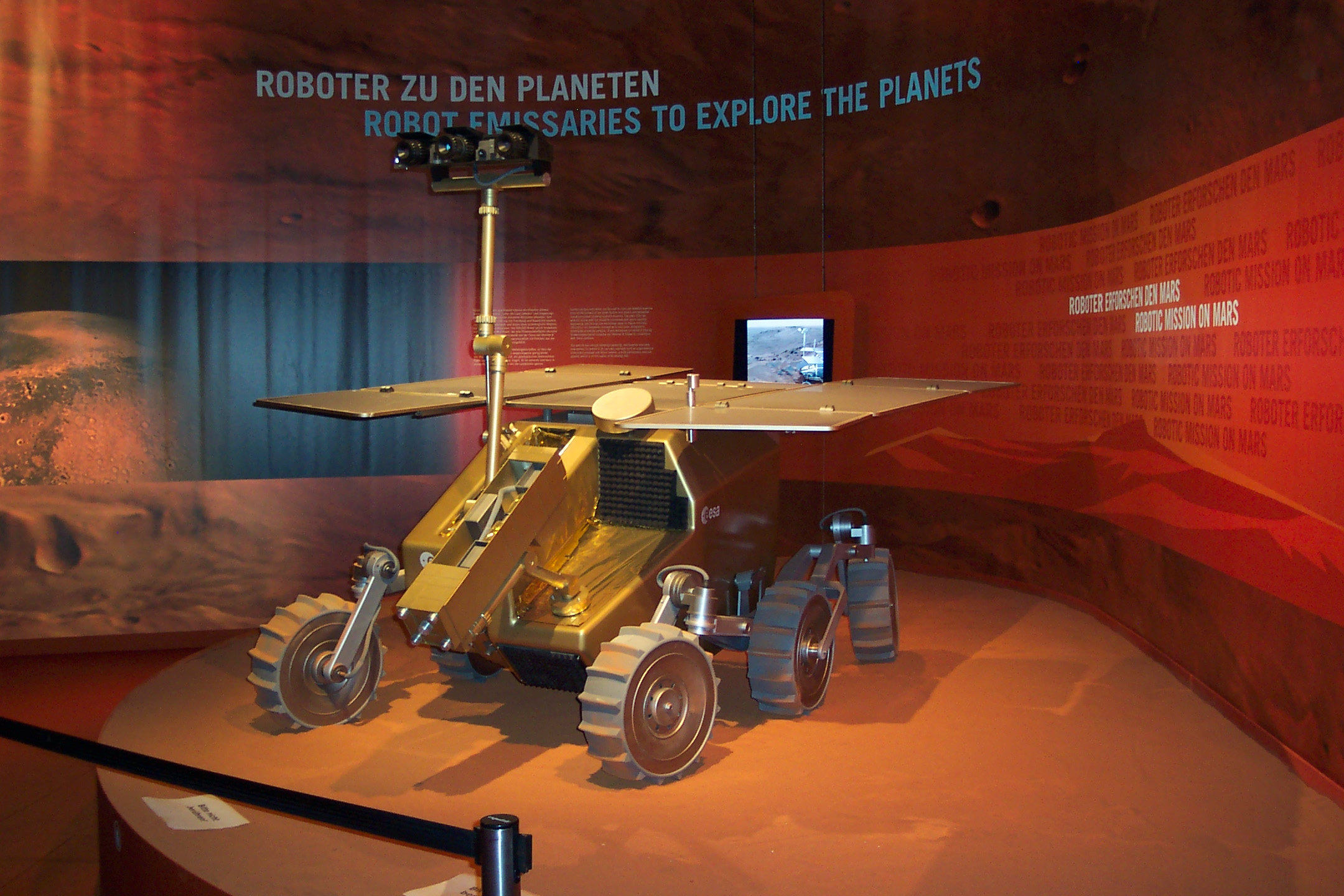
ExoMars rover model at ILA Berlin Air Show, 2006

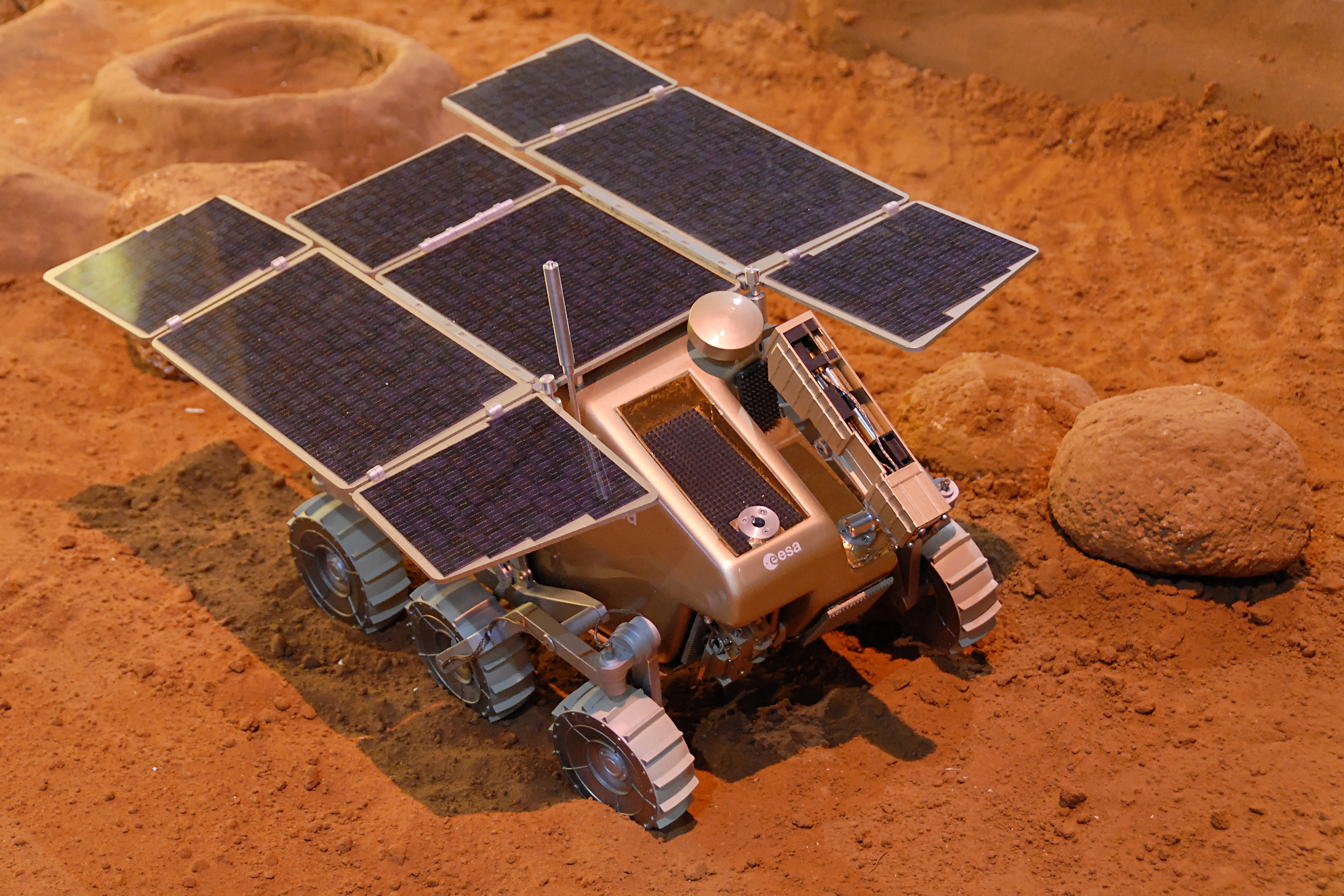
A 1:4 model of the ExoMars rover at Paris Air Show, 2007

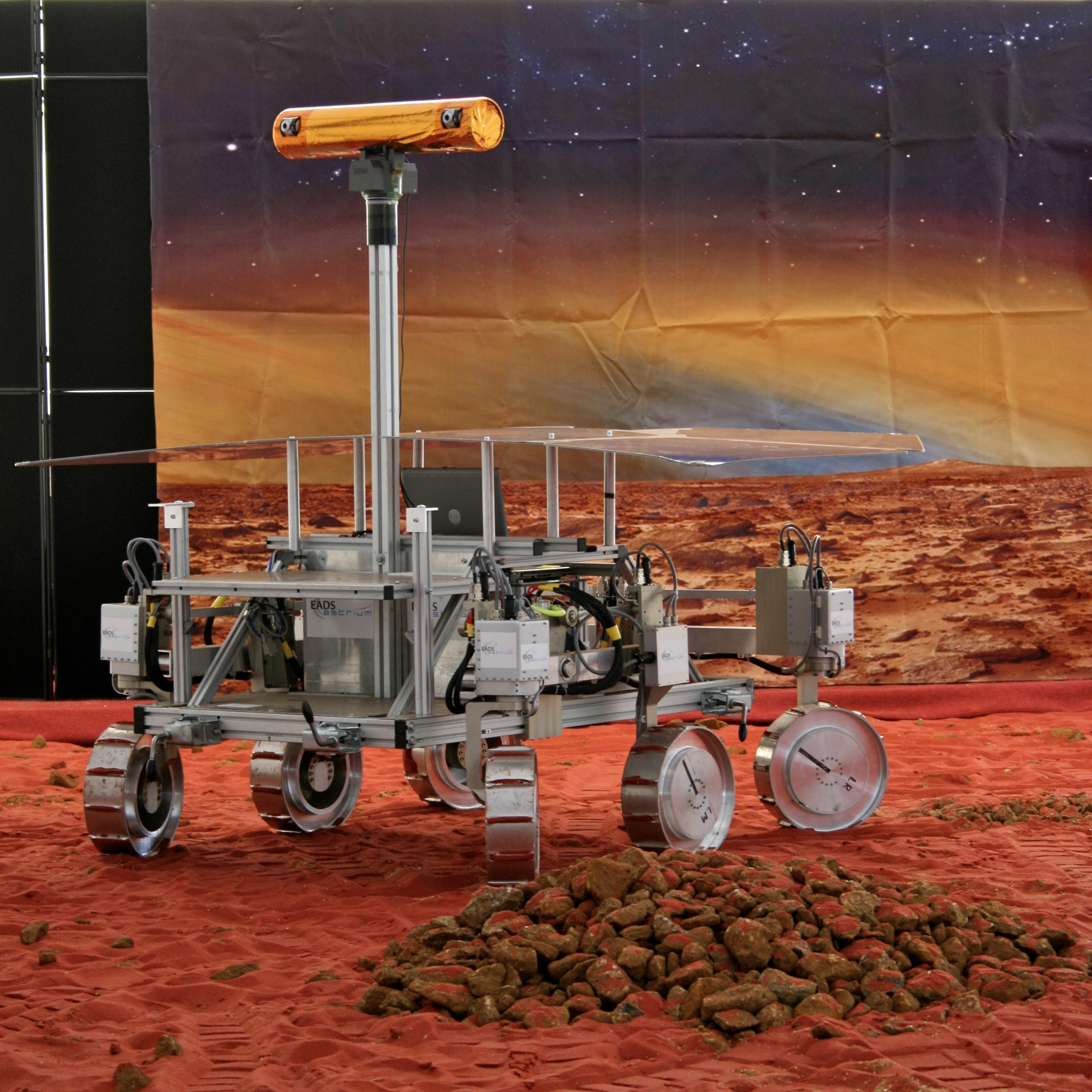
A prototype of the Rover at the Royal Astronomical Society meeting, 2009

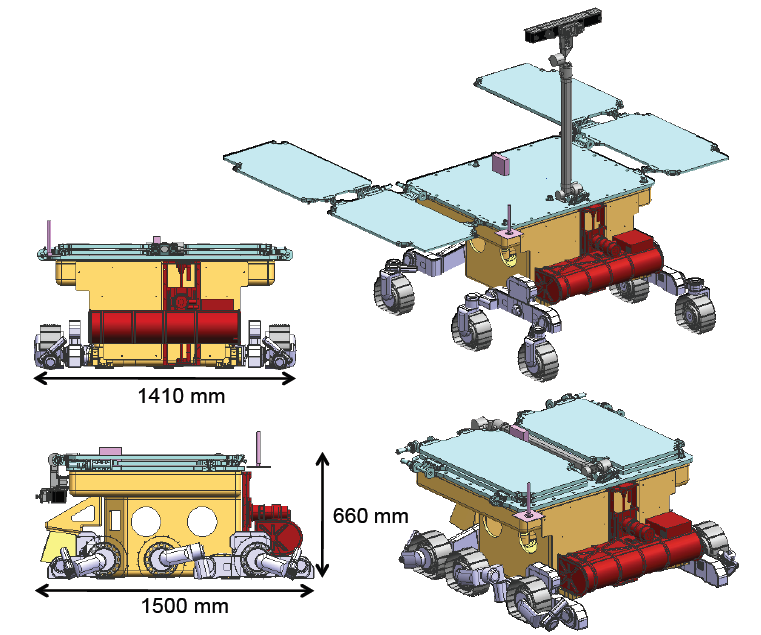
ExoMars Rover, version 2010

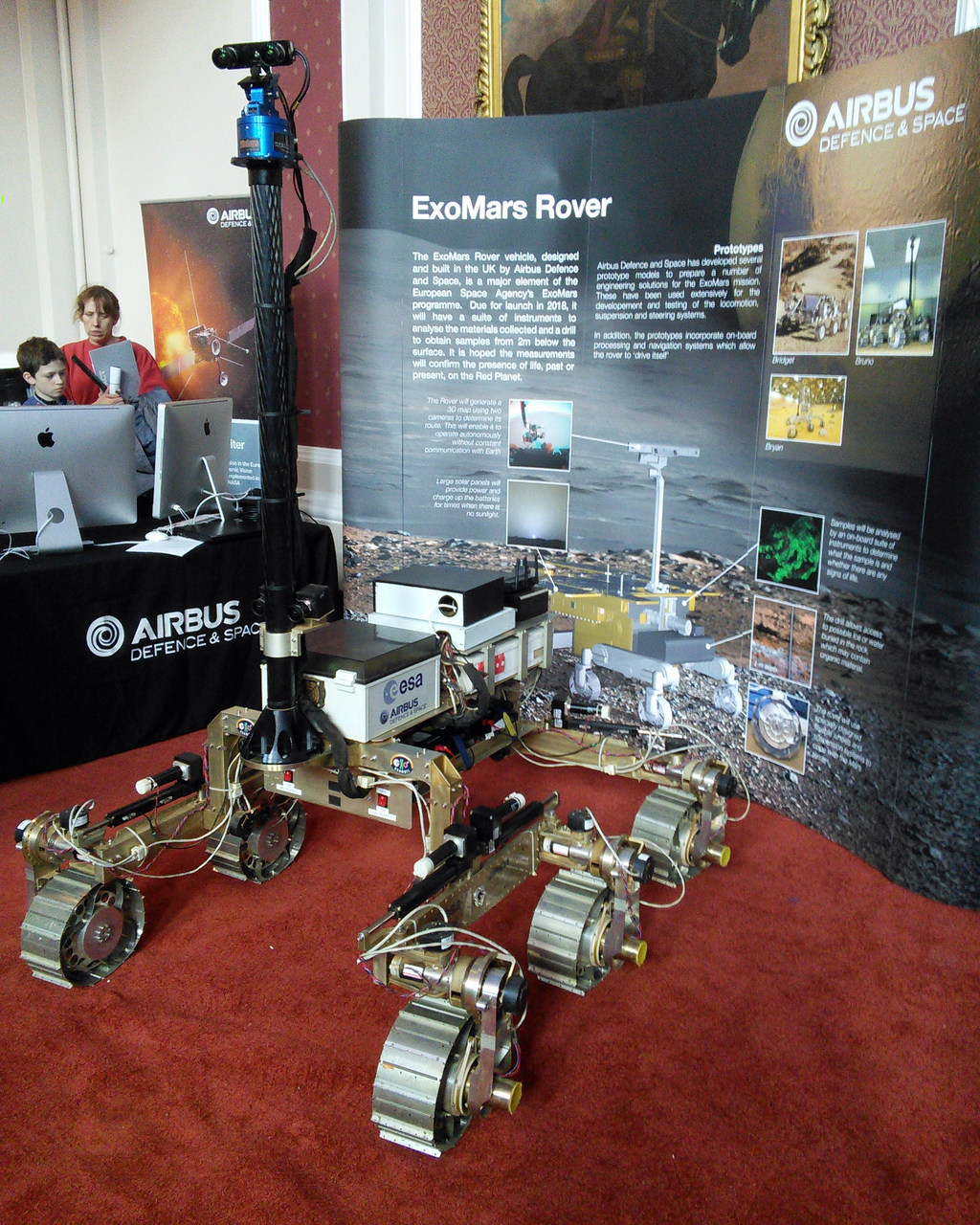
A prototype of the Rover at the Cambridge Science Festival, 2015

=== Construction ===
The lead builder of the rover, the British division of Airbus Defence and Space, began procuring critical components in March 2014. In December 2014, ESA member states approved the funding for the rover, to be sent on the second ExoMars launch in 2018, but insufficient funds had already started to threaten a launch delay until 2020. The wheels and suspension system were paid for by the Canadian Space Agency and were manufactured by MDA Corporation in Canada. Each wheel is 25 cm (9.8 in) in diameter. Roscosmos was expected to provide radioisotope heater units (RHU) for the rover to keep its electronic components warm at night. The rover was assembled by Airbus DS in the UK during 2018 and 2019.

=== Testing ===
On 27 March 2014, a "Mars Yard" was opened at Airbus Defence and Space in Stevenage, UK, to facilitate the development and testing of the rover's autonomous navigation system. The yard is 30 by 13 m (98 by 43 ft) and contains 300 tonnes (330 short tons; 300 long tons) of sand and rocks designed to mimic the terrain of the Martian environment.

Like all other Martian rovers the ExoMars team also built a twin rover for Rosalind Franklin, known as the Ground Test Model (GTM), with the nickname Amalia. This test model borrows its name from Professor Amalia Ercoli Finzi, a renowned astrophysicist with broad experience in spaceflight dynamics. Amalia has demonstrated drilling soil samples down to 1.7 meters and operating all the instruments while sending scientific data to the Rover Operations Control Centre (ROCC), the operational hub that will orchestrate the roaming of the European-built rover on Mars. It was being used in a Mars terrain simulator at the ALTEC premises in Turin. In 2022, engineers were using the Amalia rover to recreate different scenarios and help them take decisions that will keep Rosalind safe in the challenging environment of Mars and to run risky operations, from driving around Martian slopes seeking the best path for science operations to drilling and analyzing rocks.

=== Landing site selection ===
A primary goal when selecting the rover's landing site is to identify a particular geologic environment, or set of environments, that would support —now or in the past— microbial life. The scientists prefer a landing site with both morphologic and mineralogical evidence for past water. Furthermore, a site with spectra indicating multiple hydrated minerals such as clay minerals is preferred, but it will come down to a balance between engineering constraints and scientific goals. Engineering constraints call for a flat landing site in a latitude band straddling the equator that is only 30° latitude from top to bottom because the rover is solar-powered and will need best sunlight exposure. The landing module carrying the rover will have a landing ellipse that measures about 105 km by 15 km. Scientific requirements include landing in an area with 3.6 billion years old sedimentary rocks that are a record of the past wet habitable environment. The year before launch, the European Space Agency will make the final decision. By March 2014, the long list was:

- Aram Dorsum
- Coogoon Valles
- Hypanis Vallis
- Mawrth Vallis
- Oxia Planum
- Simud Valles
- Southern Isidis

After a review by an ESA-appointed panel, a short list of four sites (Mawrth Vallis, Oxia Planum, Hypanis Vallis, Aram Dorsum) was formally recommended in October 2014 for further detailed analysis. These landing sites exhibit evidence of a complex aqueous history in the past. On 21 October 2015, Oxia Planum was chosen as the preferred landing site for the rover, with Aram Dorsum and Mawrth Vallis as backup options. In March 2017 the Landing Site Selection Working Group narrowed the choice to Oxia Planum and Mawrth Vallis, and in November 2018, Oxia Planum was once again chosen, pending sign-off by the heads of the European and Russian space agencies.

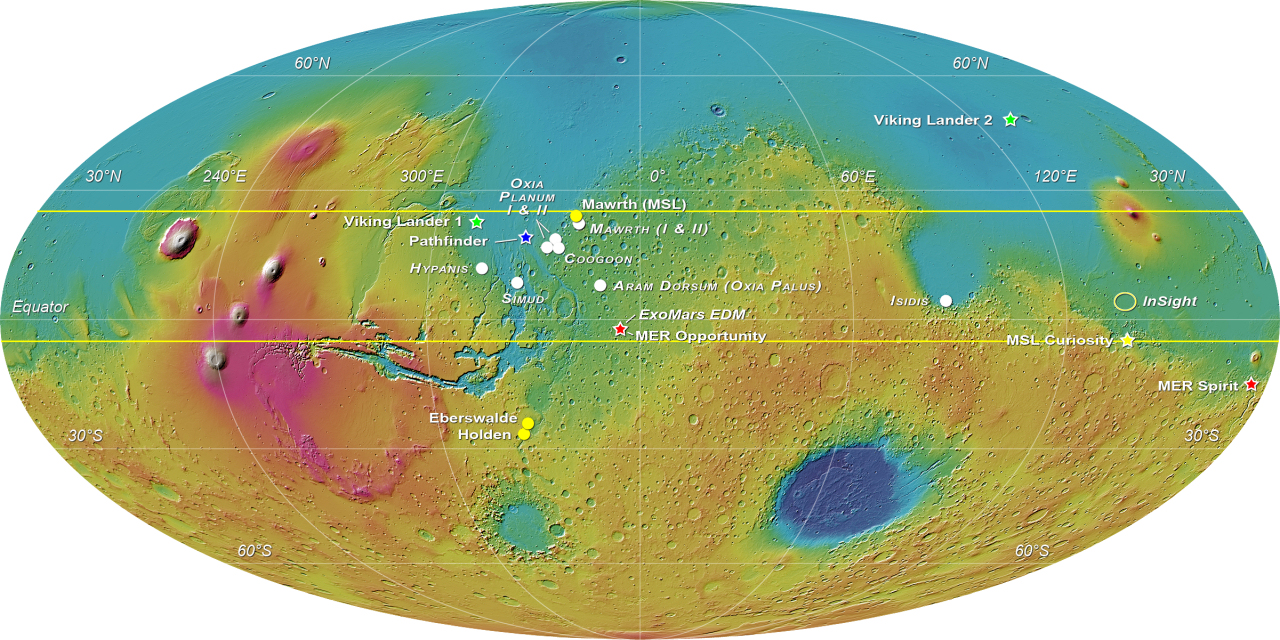
White circles show the landing sites proposed for the ExoMars rover

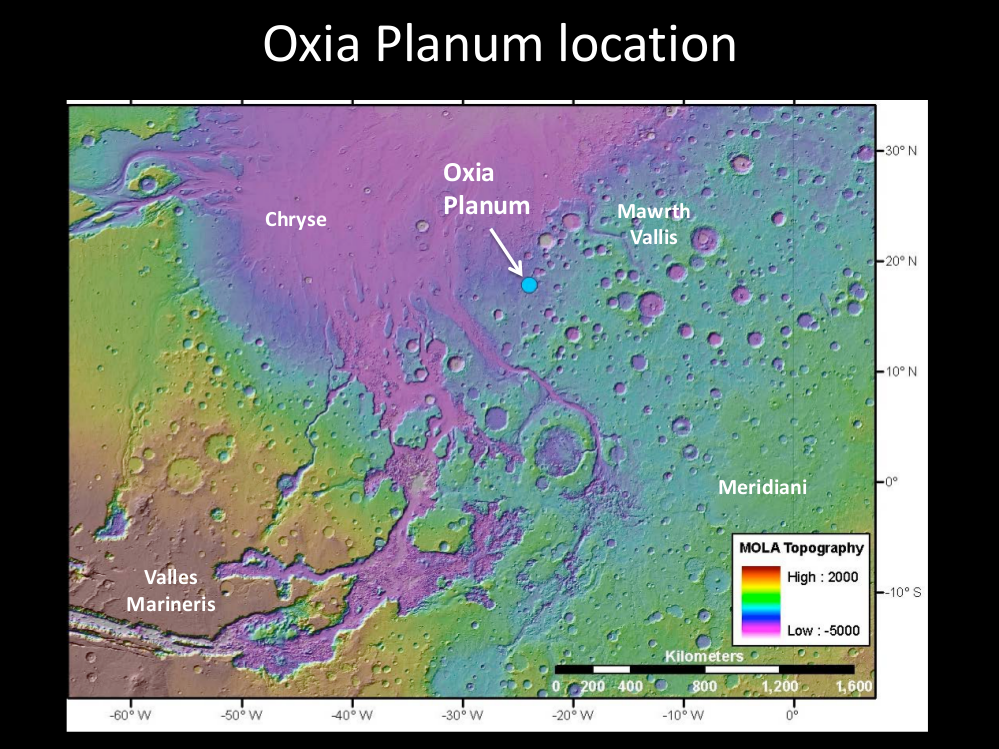
Location of Oxia Planum

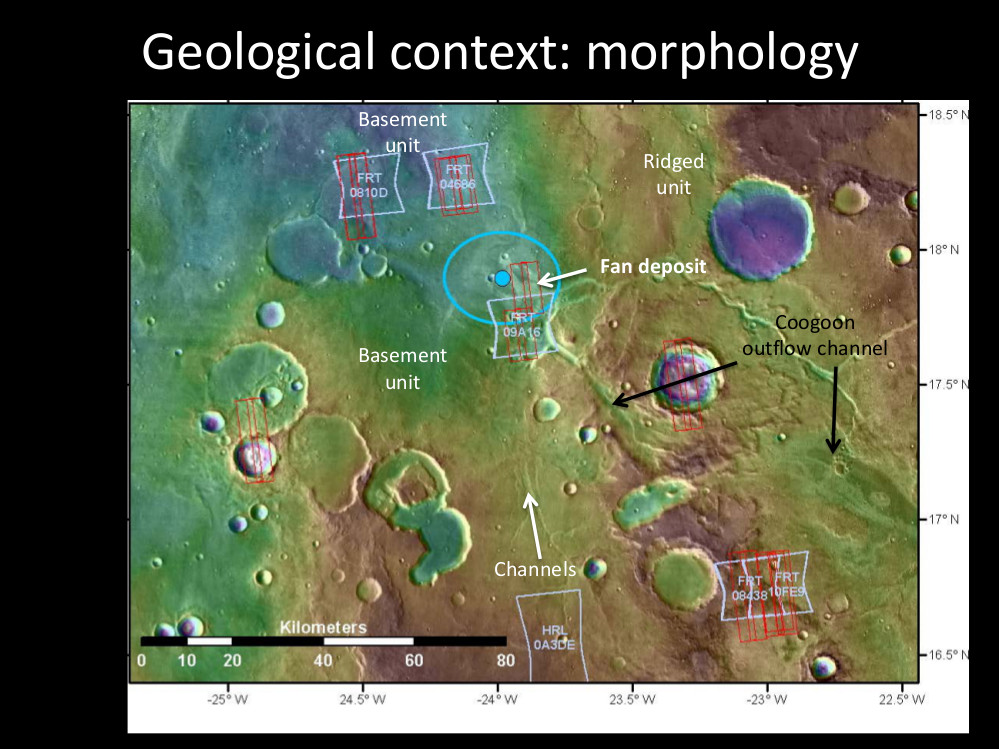
Geological morphology of Oxia Planum

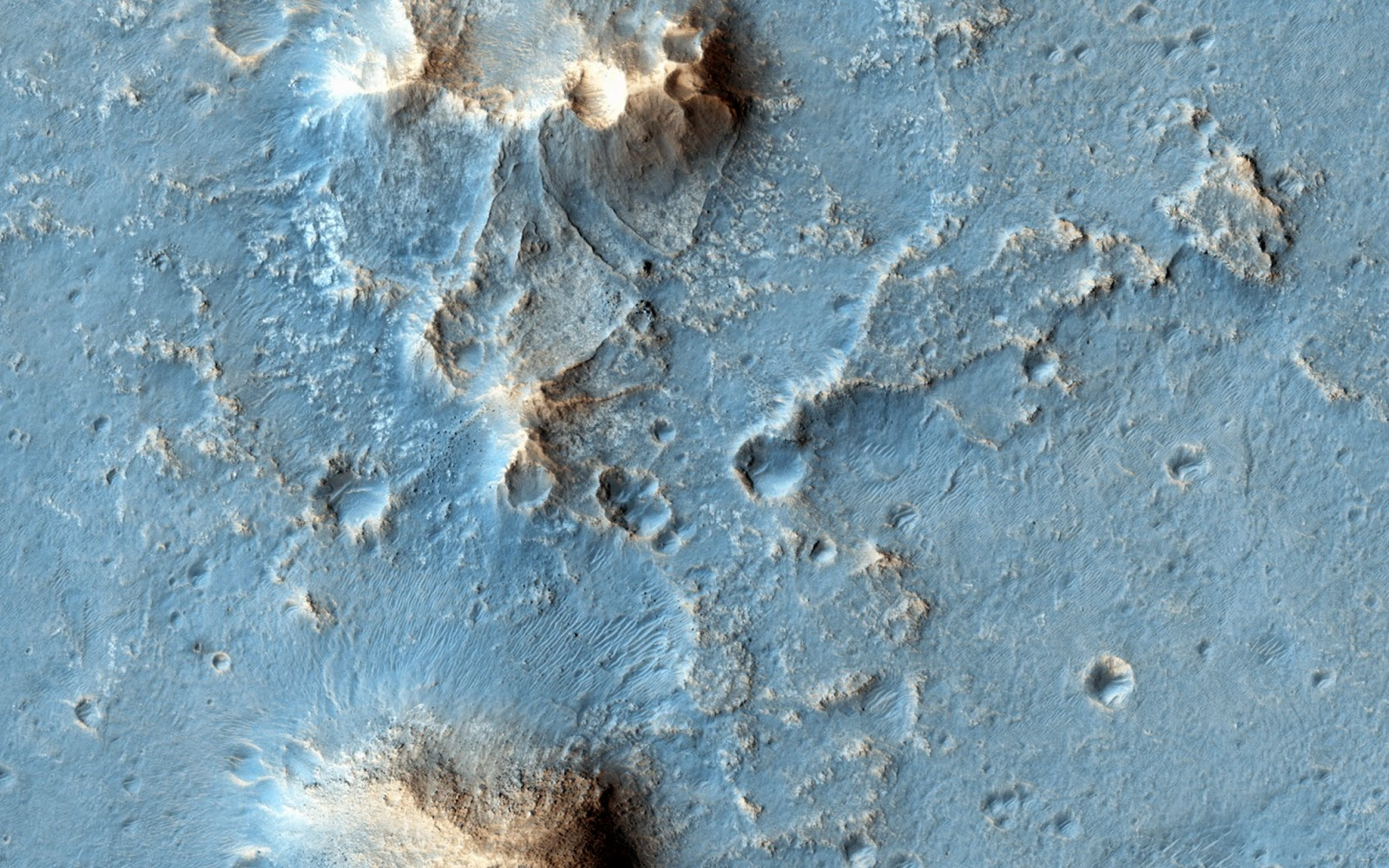
Oxia Planum near Coogoon Vallis, by HiRise

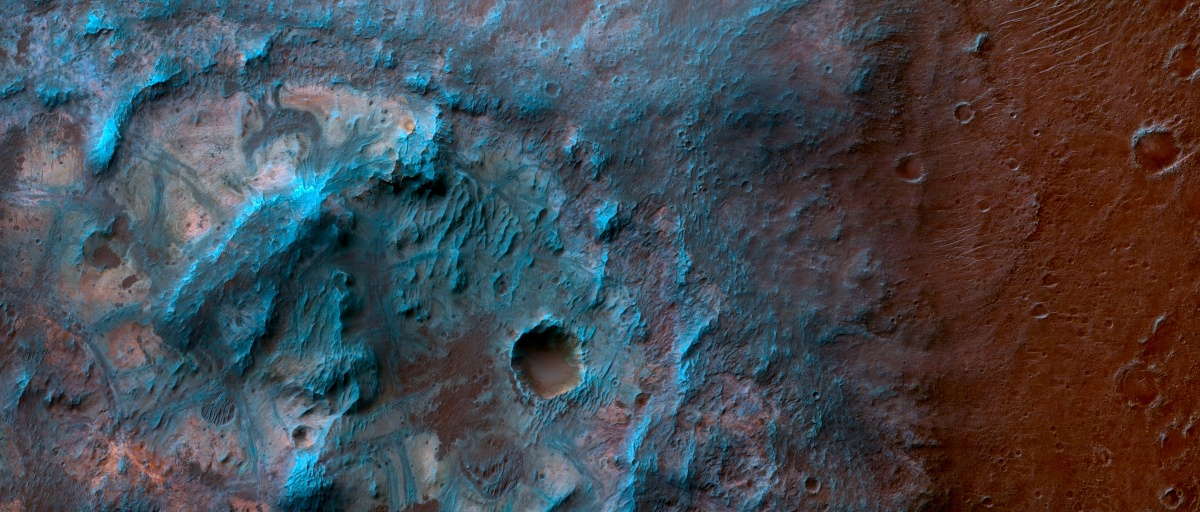
A mound near Oxia Planum, by HiRise

=== Naming ===
In July 2018, the European Space Agency launched a public outreach campaign to choose a name for the rover. On 7 February 2019, the ExoMars rover was named Rosalind Franklin in honour of scientist Rosalind Franklin (1920–1958), who made key contributions to the understanding of the molecular structures of DNA (deoxyribonucleic acid), RNA (ribonucleic acid), viruses, coal, and graphite.

=== Launch delays ===
By March 2013, the spacecraft was scheduled to launch in 2018 with a Mars landing in early 2019. Delays in European and Russian industrial activities and deliveries of scientific payloads forced the launch to be pushed back. In May 2016, ESA announced that the mission had been moved to the next available launch window of July 2020. ESA ministerial meetings in December 2016 reviewed mission issues including €300 million ExoMars funding and lessons learned from the ExoMars 2016 Schiaparelli mission, which had crashed after its atmospheric entry and parachute descent (the 2020 mission drawing on Schiaparelli heritage for elements of its entry, descent and landing systems). In March 2020, ESA delayed the launch to August–October 2022 due to parachute testing issues. This was later refined to a twelve-day launch window starting on 20 September until 1 October 2022, with a scheduled landing around 10 June 2023.

=== Landing site re-evaluation ===
The delay of the rover mission to 2020 from 2018 meant that Oxia Planum was no longer the only favourable landing site due to changes in the possible landing ellipse. Both Mawrth Vallis and Aram Dorsum, surviving candidates from the previous selection, could be reconsidered. ESA convened further workshops to re-evaluate the three remaining options and in March 2017 selected two sites (Mawrth Vallis, Oxia Planum) to study in detail.

On 9 November 2018, ESA announced that Oxia Planum was favoured by the Landing Site Selection Working Group. The favored Oxia Planum landing ellipse is situated at 18.20°N, 335.45°E. In 2019, Oxia Planum was confirmed by ESA as the landing site for the planned 2020 mission. Later that year, a flyover video of the landing site was released, created using high-accuracy 3D models of the terrain obtained from HiRISE.

In August 2022, the Oxia Planum region was discovered to be rich in clays, which are formed in water-rich environments. In March 2025, scientists have published the most detailed geological map of Oxia Planum ever in the Journal of Maps. The map will be used by ESA to decide how the rover explores the area, interprets its surroundings, and collects scientific evidence.

=== Partnership with Russia cancelled ===
The diplomatic crisis over the Russian invasion of Ukraine further delayed the launch, due to the plan to use Russian launch and landing hardware. On 17 March 2022, ESA announced that the launch of the rover has been suspended, with the earliest new date being sometime in late 2024.

=== Mission restart ===
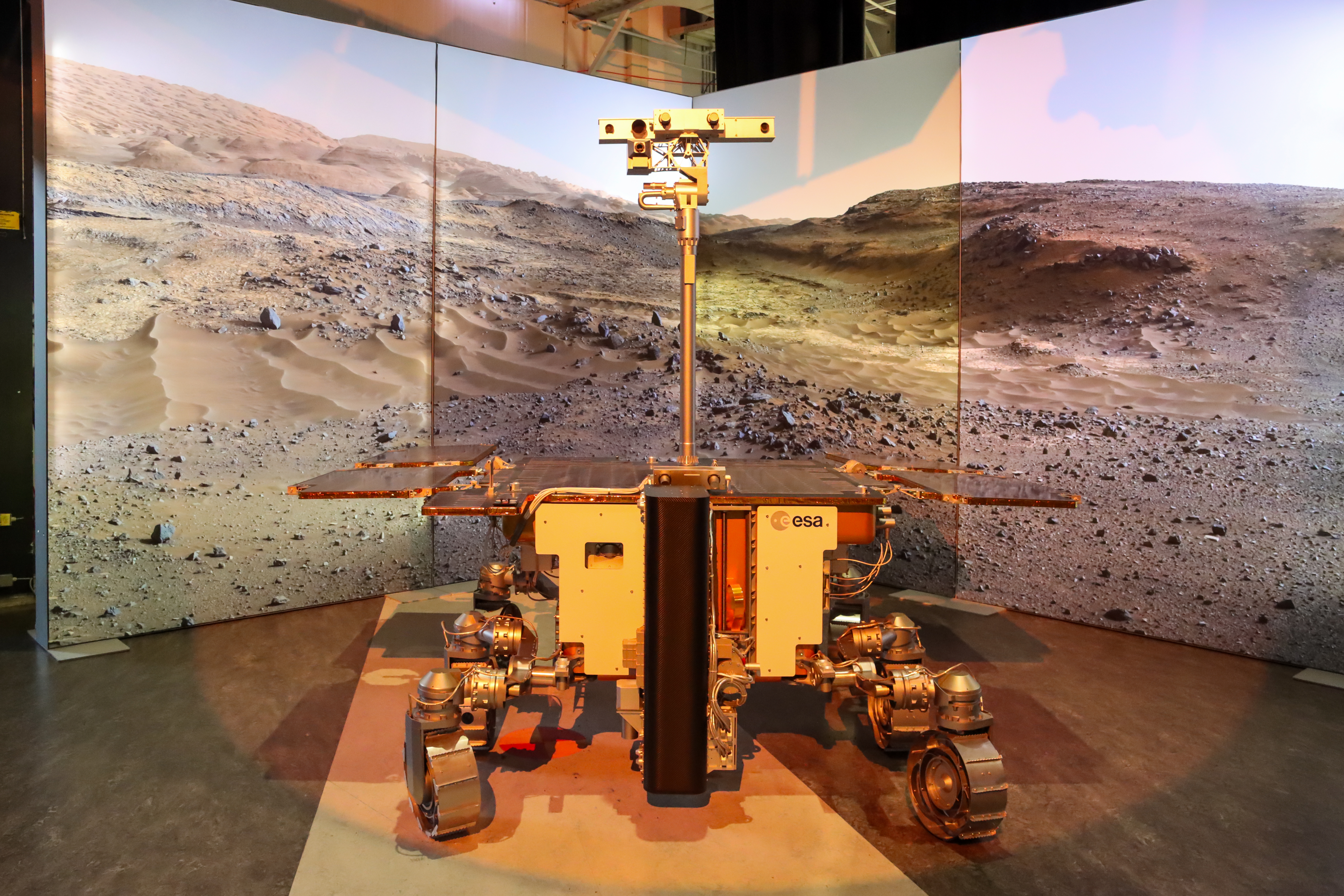
Model of the Rosalind Franklin rover in Noordwijk, 2024

In 2024, the mission received additional funding to restart the mission. The award went to Thales Alenia Space, with a launch scheduled for 2028. In May 2024, ESA signed an agreement with NASA to procure a US launch vehicle for the mission. In March 2025, ESA has selected SENER to develop several systems for the Descent Module (landing gear, mechanisms and adapter for separating the entry capsule, and UHF communications antennas) and for the rover (drill positioning and translation system, solar panel deployment mechanism, and X and UHF band antennas). Later in March 2025, Airbus was selected to build the landing platform replacing the previously planned Russian lander.

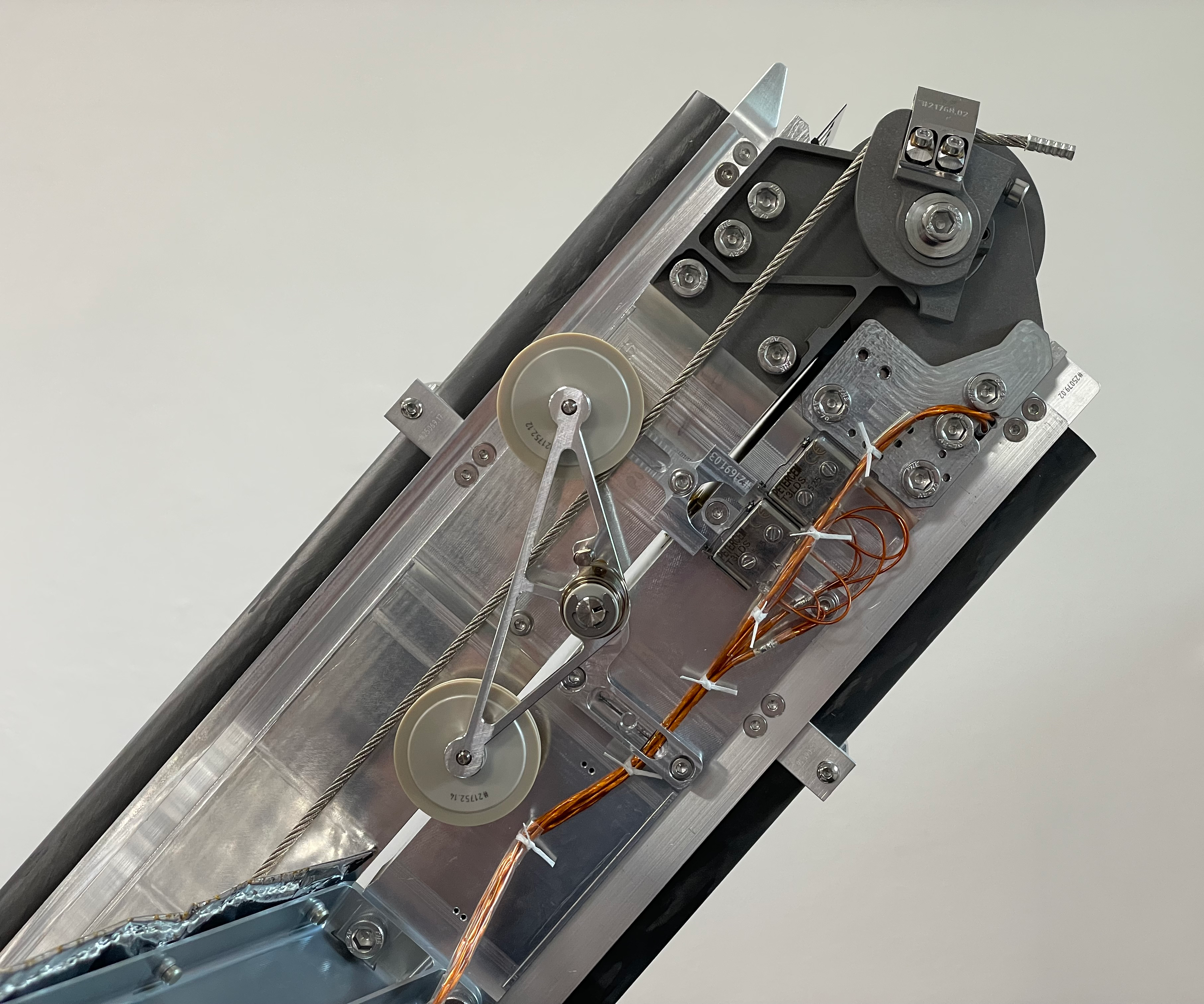
Mechanism of the lander's ramps tested by Astronika in Warsaw, 2025

=== Resumed preparations ===
In March 2025, the French-German Research Institute of Saint-Louis (ISL) was testing the aerodynamics of the Descent Module by shooting a tiny sensor-equipped model of the capsule from a gun at speeds ranged from 1,800 to 4,300 km/h. On 7 July 2025, ESA has retested the parachutes by dropping a dummy Descent Module from a stratospheric helium balloon launched from Esrange. This was needed for recertification of the system after the restart of the mission preparations. In early August 2025, ArianeGroup has receives a heat shield mock-up from Loiretech to be used for the initial qualification of the Descent Module heat shield.

In October 2025, the Polish company Astronika demonstrated the deployment of the landing platform's ramps and the Welsh Aberystwyth University delivered a test model of the ENFYS infrared spectrometer, replacing the cancelled Russian ISEM, for installation on the rover's Ground Test Model in Turin, Italy. In early December 2025, Loiretech delivered a full-scale mock-up of the rear heat shield structure of the Descent Module to ArianeGroup's facilities in Saint-Médard-en-Jalles.

In late 2025, NASA confirmed that it still planned to provide all previously agreed elements of the mission (launch vehicle, radioisotope heater, braking engine, and one science instrument) despite the budget uncertainty in the US. At the November 2025 ministerial council in Bremen, ESA member states confirmed all necessary funding for continuation of the ExoMars programme including the Rosalind Franklin rover, although the overall Human and Robotic Exploration programme received lower than expected funding. In December 2025, Thales Alenia Space and Airbus started performing drop tests with a full-scale model of the landing platform in Turin, Italy in order to verify the performance of the platform's landing legs and touchdown sensors.

In March 2026, NASA reaffirmed its commitment to the mission and on 16 April 2026, the agency approved the Rosalind Franklin Support and Augmentation (ROSA) project, providing the previously agreed hardware and services to the ESA-led mission. NASA also announced the selection of SpaceX's Falcon Heavy rocket for the rover's launch from Launch Complex 39A at Kennedy Space Center in late 2028.

In April 2026, the 35 m, 74 kg second stage main parachute (the mission's largest) went through dry heat sterilisation at ESTEC in order to prevent contamination of Mars with Earth microbes in accordance with planetary protection measures. Later, it was sent back to Thales Alenia Space in Turin for spacecraft integration. On 12 May 2026, Thales Alenia Space shipped structural models of all components of the spacecraft from Turin to Cannes for integrated vibration and acoustic test campaigns. In June 2026, NASA has delivered the first braking engines for the mission and Arianespace began integrating the mission's heat shield at their Issac facility in France. In July 2026, ESA tested the lander's ramps in a vacuum chamber at a Criotec facility in Italy. In August 2026, Thales Alenia Space tested the deployment of landing legs of the full-scale model of the landing platform, as well as the separation of the landing platform model from the descent module backshell at their facilities in Turin.

During 2026, Thales Alenia Space in Turin performed a series of drive tests using the fully representative rover model Amelia, simulating egress of the rover from the landing platform under various conditions. In September 2026, Airbus used another rover model called Charlie to test Rosalind Franklin's navigation software by driving it in Tabernas desert, Spain.

== Mission components ==
=== Descent Module ===
The landing platform and the Rosalind Franklin rover will travel to Mars inside the Descent Module, a blunt-shape reentry capsule composed of the front heat shield, rear jacket (backshell), and the parachute system. The front heat shield is protected by the "Norcoat Liège HPK" cork thermal protection system.

=== Carrier Module ===
The Descent Module will be attached to the Carrier Module, which will provide power, propulsion, and navigation. The Carrier Module has 16 hydrazine powered thrusters, 6 solar arrays that will provide electricity, Sun sensors and star trackers for navigation. It was developed and built by OHB System in Bremen, Germany. The Carrier Module will separate from the Descent Module right before the stacked spacecraft arrives at Mars.

=== Landing platform ===
==== Kazachok ====
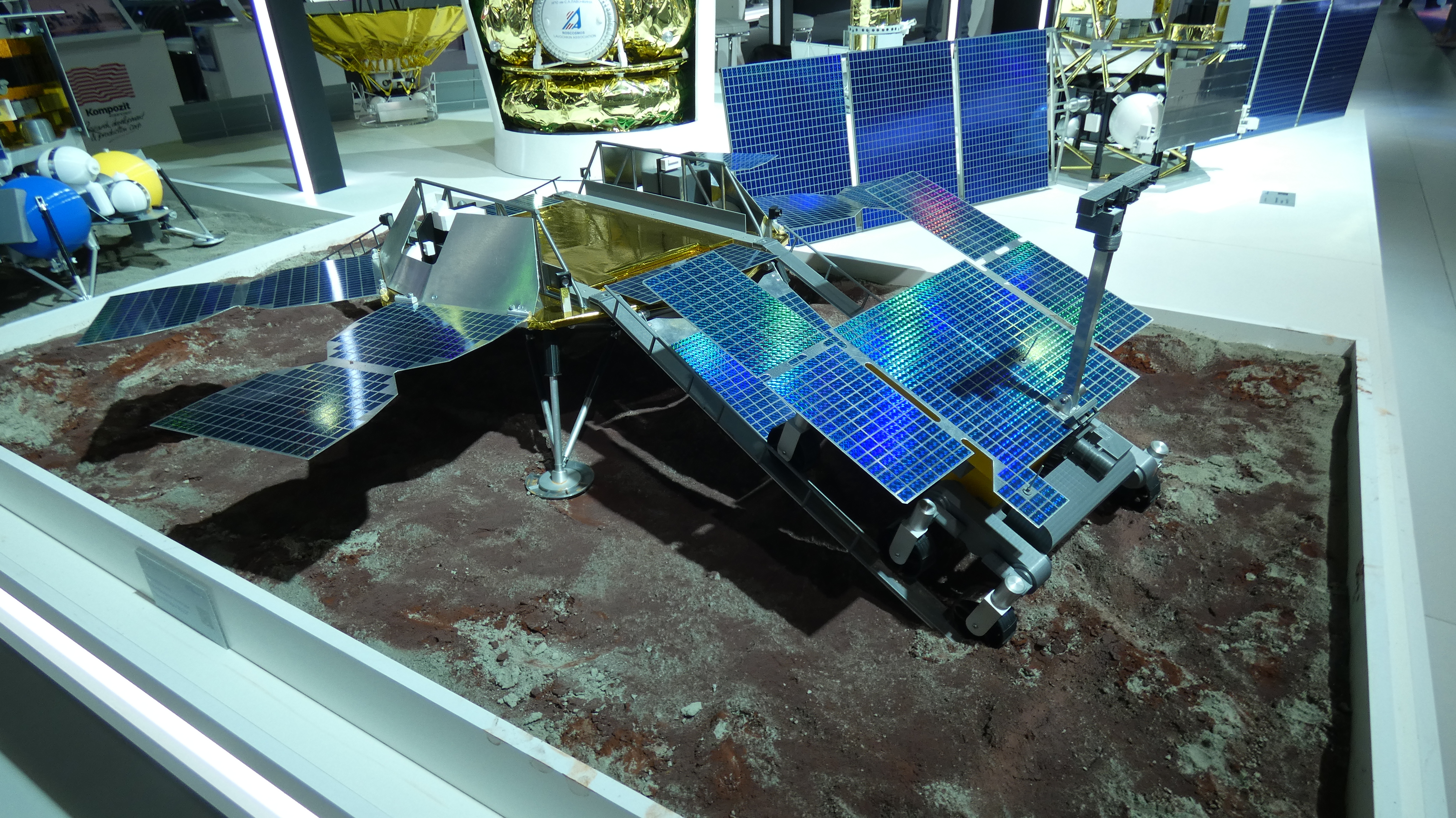
Model of Kazachok deploying the rover, 2021

The pre-2022 plan called for a Russian launch vehicle, an ESA carrier module, and a Russian lander named Kazachok, that would deploy the rover to Mars's surface. After Kazachok landed, it would have extended a ramp to deploy the Rosalind Franklin rover to the surface. The lander would have remained stationary and started a two-year mission to investigate the surface environment at the landing site. The lander was expected to image the landing site, monitor the climate, investigate the atmosphere, analyse the radiation environment, study the distribution of any subsurface water at the landing site, and perform geophysical investigations of the internal structure of Mars.

Science instruments were planned in two groups: the Pasteur payload (on the rover) and the Humboldt payload (on the lander). Following a March 2015 request for the contribution of scientific instruments for the landing system, it was expected to host 13 instruments. Examples of the instruments on the lander include the HABIT (HabitAbility: Brine, Irradiation and Temperature) package, the METEO meteorological package, the MAIGRET magnetometer, and the LaRa (Lander Radioscience) experiment. The stationary lander was expected to operate for at least one Earth year, and its instruments would have been powered by solar arrays.

==== EDLM ====
The new European landing platform replacing Kazachok, the European Entry Descent and Landing Module (EDLM), is being manufactured by Airbus Defense and Space at their Stevenage, UK production facility and will use throttable braking engines provided by NASA. The landing is planned for 2030. The platform will use a set of parachutes and retro rockets to slow down from 45 m/s to less than 3 m/s just before touchdown. After landing, two ramps will extend from opposite sides of the platform, offering a choice of routes to reach the surface. The landing platform will not have its own solar panels and will cease to operate a few sols after deploying the rover to the surface. During this short time, EDLM will collect environmental data using the Platform Atmospheric Characterisation Instrument Suite (PACIS) which includes a pressure and a temperature sensor and a microphone.

=== Heater units ===
The rover will include an experimental European americium radioisotope heater unit (RHU) developed by ESA through its ENDURE programme. It will be the first usage of americium-241 on any spacecraft. Americium-241 has a considerably longer half-life than plutonium-238, the radioisotope used to power NASA's Perseverance and Curiosity rovers. However, as a consequence, the power density of a ^{241}Am-based RHU is considerably lower than that of a ^{238}Pu-based RHU.

=== Navigation ===
The ExoMars mission requires the rover to be capable of driving across the Martian terrain at 70 m (230 ft) per sol (Martian day) to enable it to meet its science objectives. The rover is designed to operate for at least seven months and drive 4 km (2.5 mi), after landing. Since the rover communicates with the ground controllers via the ExoMars Trace Gas Orbiter (TGO), and the orbiter only passes over the rover approximately twice per sol, the ground controllers will not be able to actively guide the rover across the surface. The Rosalind Franklin rover is therefore designed to navigate autonomously across the Martian surface. Two stereo camera pairs (NavCam and LocCam) allow the rover to build up a 3D map of the terrain, which the navigation software then uses to assess the terrain around the rover so that it avoids obstacles and finds an efficient route to the ground controller specified destination.

=== Pasteur payload ===
The rover will search for two types of subsurface life signatures, morphological and chemical. It will not analyse atmospheric samples, and it has no dedicated meteorological station. The 26 kg (57 lb) scientific payload comprises the following survey and analytical instruments:

==== Panoramic Camera (PanCam) ====
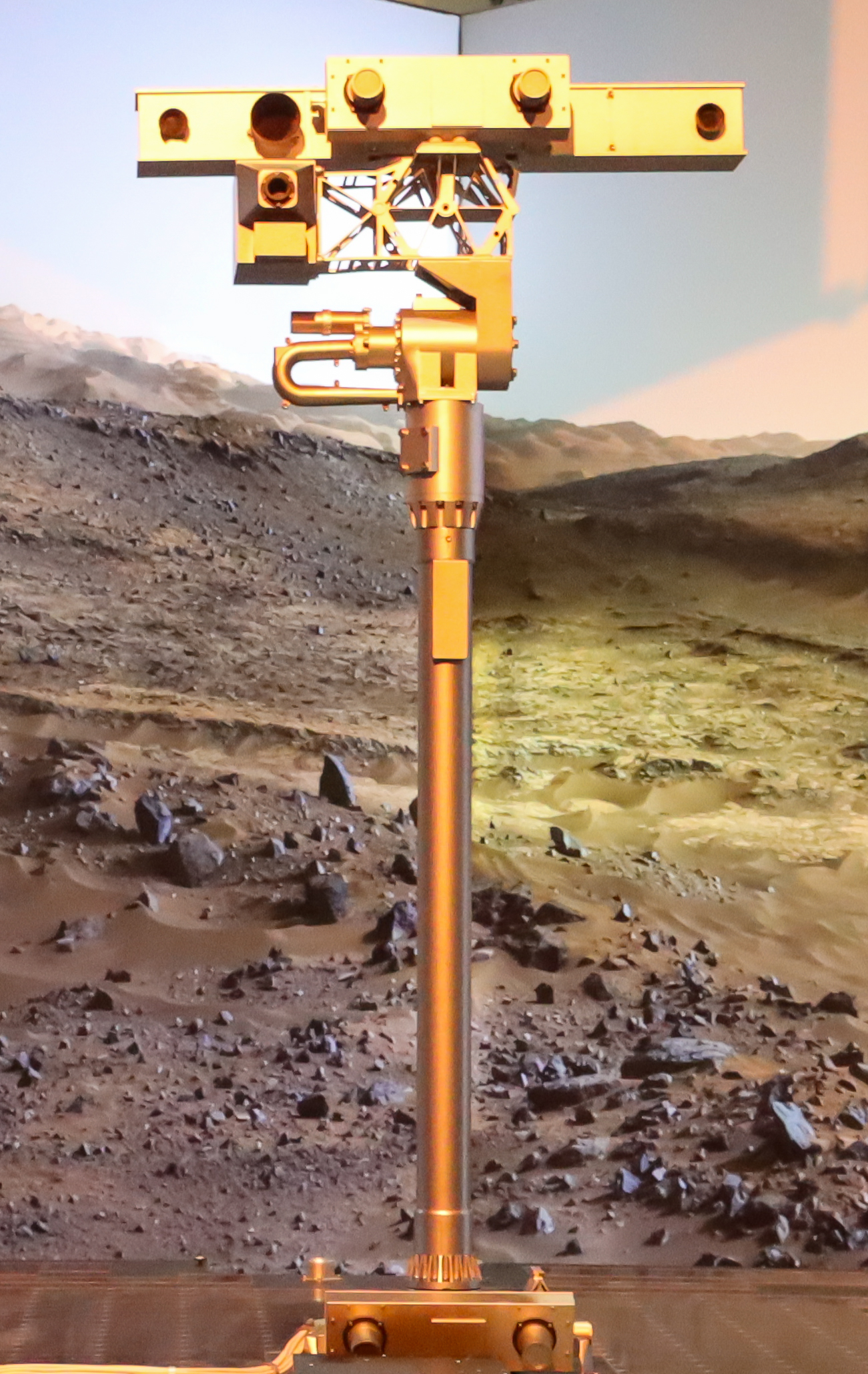
PanCam and ENFYS model, 2024

PanCam has been designed to perform digital terrain mapping for the rover and to search for morphological signatures of past biological activity preserved on the texture of surface rocks. The PanCam Optical Bench (OB) mounted on the Rover mast includes two wide angle cameras (WACs) for multi-spectral stereoscopic panoramic imaging, and a high resolution camera (HRC) for high-resolution colour imaging.

PanCam will also support the scientific measurements of other instruments by taking high-resolution images of locations that are difficult to access, such as craters or rock walls, and by supporting the selection of the best sites to carry out exobiology studies.

In addition to the OB, PanCam includes a calibration target (PCT), Fiducial Markers (FidMs) and Rover Inspection Mirror (RIM). The PCT's stained glass calibration targets will provide a UV-stable reflectance and colour reference for PanCam and ISEM, allowing for the generation of calibrated data products.

==== Infrared Spectrometer ====
The Russian ISEM optical box would be installed on the rover's mast, below PanCam's HRC, with an electronics box inside the Rover. It would be used to assess bulk mineralogy characterization and remote identification of water-related minerals. Working with PanCam, ISEM would contribute to the selection of suitable samples for further analysis by the other instruments.

The Russian-built ISEM instrument was replaced by a UK-built instrument ENFYS, led by the University of Aberystwyth in Wales. This spectrometer will be installed in the same location below PanCam's HRC instrument, and will perform an identical role in assessing bulk mineralogy using IR spectrometry with special focus on clay minerals. The development of ENFYS was supported with £10.7 million from the UK Space Agency. ENFYS was named after the Welsh word for rainbow.

==== Water Ice Subsurface Deposits Observation on Mars (WISDOM) ====
WISDOM is a ground-penetrating radar that will explore the subsurface of Mars to identify layering and help select interesting buried formations from which to collect samples for analysis. It can transmit and receive signals using two Vivaldi-antennas mounted on the aft section of the rover, with electronics inside the Rover. Electromagnetic waves penetrating into the ground are reflected at places where there is a sudden transition in the electrical parameters of the soil. By studying these reflections it is possible to construct a stratigraphic map of the subsurface and identify underground targets down to 2 to 3 m (7 to 10 ft) in depth, comparable to the 2 m reach of the rover's drill. These data, combined with those produced by the other survey instruments and by the analyses carried out on previously collected samples, will be used to support drilling activities.

==== Adron-RM ====
Adron-RM is a neutron spectrometer to search for subsurface water ice and hydrated minerals. It is housed inside the Rover and will be used in combination with the WISDOM ground-penetrating radar to study the subsurface beneath the rover and to search for optimal sites for drilling and sample collection.

==== Close-Up Imager (CLUPI) ====
CLUPI, mounted on the drill box, will visually study rock targets at close range (50 cm/20 in) with sub-millimetre resolution. This instrument will also investigate the fines produced during drilling operations, and image samples collected by the drill. CLUPI has variable focusing and can obtain high-resolution images at longer distances. The CLUPI imaging unit is complemented by two mirrors and a calibration target.

==== Mars Multispectral Imager for Subsurface Studies (Ma_MISS) ====
Ma_MISS is an infrared spectrometer located inside the core drill. Ma_MISS will observe the lateral wall of the borehole created by the drill to study the subsurface stratigraphy, to understand the distribution and state of water-related minerals, and to characterise the geophysical environment. The analyses of unexposed material by Ma_MISS, together with data obtained with the spectrometers located inside the rover, will be crucial for the unambiguous interpretation of the original conditions of Martian rock formation. The composition of the regolith and crustal rocks provides important information about the geologic evolution of the near-surface crust, the evolution of the atmosphere and climate, and the existence of past life.

==== MicrOmega ====
MicrOmega is an infrared hyperspectral microscope housed within the Rover's ALD that can analyse the powder material derived from crushing samples collected by the core drill. Its objective is to study mineral grain assemblages in detail to try to unravel their geological origin, structure, and composition. These data will be vital for interpreting past and present geological processes and environments on Mars. Because MicrOmega is an imaging instrument, it can also be used to identify grains that are particularly interesting, and assign them as targets for Raman and MOMA-LDMS observations.

==== Raman Laser Spectrometer (RLS) ====
RLS is a Raman spectrometer housed within the ALD that will provide geological and mineralogical context information complementary to that obtained by MicrOmega. It is a fast technique employed to identify mineral phases produced by water-related processes. Its purpose is to help identify organic compounds and search for life by identifying the mineral products and indicators of biologic activities (biosignatures).

==== Mars Organic Molecule Analyzer (MOMA) ====
MOMA is the rover's largest instrument, housed within the ALD. It will conduct a broad-range, very-high sensitivity search for organic molecules in the collected sample. It includes two different ways for extracting organics: laser desorption and thermal volatilisation, followed by separation using four GC-MS columns. The identification of the evolved organic molecules is performed with an ion trap mass spectrometer. The Max Planck Institute for Solar System Research is leading the development. International partners include NASA. The mass spectrometer is provided from the Goddard Space Flight Center, while the GC is provided by the two French institutes LISA and LATMOS. The UV-Laser is being developed by the Laser Zentrum Hannover.

==== Payload support functions ====
Sampling from beneath the Martian surface with the intent to reach and analyze material unaltered or minimally affected by cosmic radiation is the strongest advantage of Rosalind Franklin. The ExoMars core drill was fabricated in Italy with heritage from the earlier DeeDri development, and incorporates the Ma_MISS instrument (see above). It is designed to acquire soil samples down to a maximum depth of 2 metres (6 ft 7 in) in a variety of soil types. The drill will acquire a core sample 1 cm (0.4 in) in diameter by 3 cm (1.2 in) in length, extract it and deliver it to the sample container of the ALD's Core Sample Transport Mechanism (CSTM). The CSTM drawer is then closed and the sample dropped into a crushing station. The resulting powder is fed by a dosing station into receptacles on the ALD's sample carousel: either the refillable container - for examination by MicrOmega, RLS and MOMA-LDMS - or a MOMA-GC oven. The system will complete experiment cycles and at least two vertical surveys down to 2 m (with four sample acquisitions each). This means that a minimum number of 17 samples shall be acquired and delivered by the drill for subsequent analysis.

==== De-scoped instruments ====
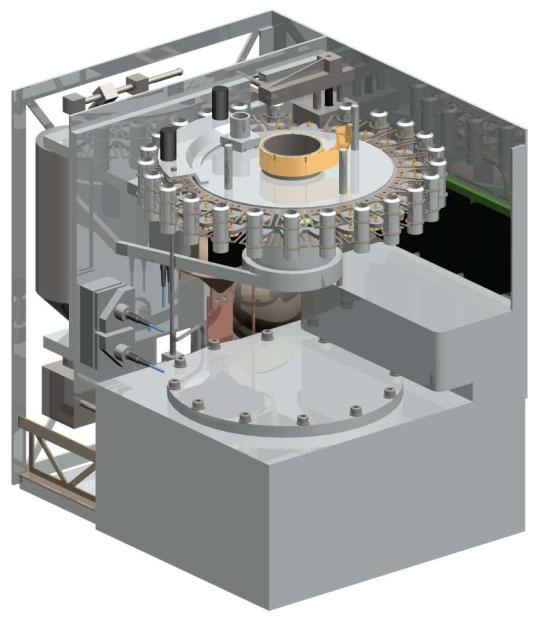
Urey design, 2013

The proposed payload has changed several times. The last major change was after the program switched from the larger rover concept back to the previous 300 kg (660 lb) rover design in 2012.

- Mars X-Ray Diffractometer (Mars-XRD) - Powder diffraction of X-rays would have determined the composition of crystalline minerals. This instrument includes also an X-ray fluorescence capability that can provide useful atomic composition information. The identification of concentrations of carbonates, sulphides or other aqueous minerals may be indicative of a Martian [hydrothermal] system capable of preserving traces of life. In other words, it would have examined the past Martian environmental conditions, and more specifically the identification of conditions related to life.
- The Urey instrument was planned to search for organic compounds in Martian rocks and soils as evidence for past life and/or prebiotic chemistry. Starting with a hot water extraction, only soluble compounds are left for further analysis. Sublimation, and capillary electrophoresis makes it possible to identify amino acids. The detection would have been done by laser-induced fluorescence, a highly sensitive technique, capable of parts-per-trillion sensitivity. These measurements were to be made at a thousand times greater sensitivity than the Viking GCMS experiment.
- Miniaturised Mössbauer Spectrometer (MIMOS-II) provides the mineralogical composition of iron-bearing surface rocks, sediments and soils. Their identification was to aid in understanding water and climate evolution and search for biomediated iron-sulfides and magnetites, which could provide evidence for former life on Mars.
- The Life Marker Chip (LMC) was for some time part of the planned payload. This instrument was intended to use a surfactant solution to extract organic matter from samples of martian rock and soil, then detect the presence of specific organic compounds using an antibody-based assay.
- Mars Infrared Mapper (MIMA), a Fourier IR spectrometer operating in the 2-25 μm range that was to be mounted on the rover's mast to investigate the martian surface and atmosphere.

== See also ==
- Astrobiology – Science concerned with life in the universe
- Life on Mars – Assessments of possible life on Mars
- List of missions to Mars
- Mars 2020 – Astrobiology Mars rover mission by NASA
- Timeline of Solar System exploration
- List of European Space Agency programmes and missions
