= Oxia Planum =

Plain on Mars

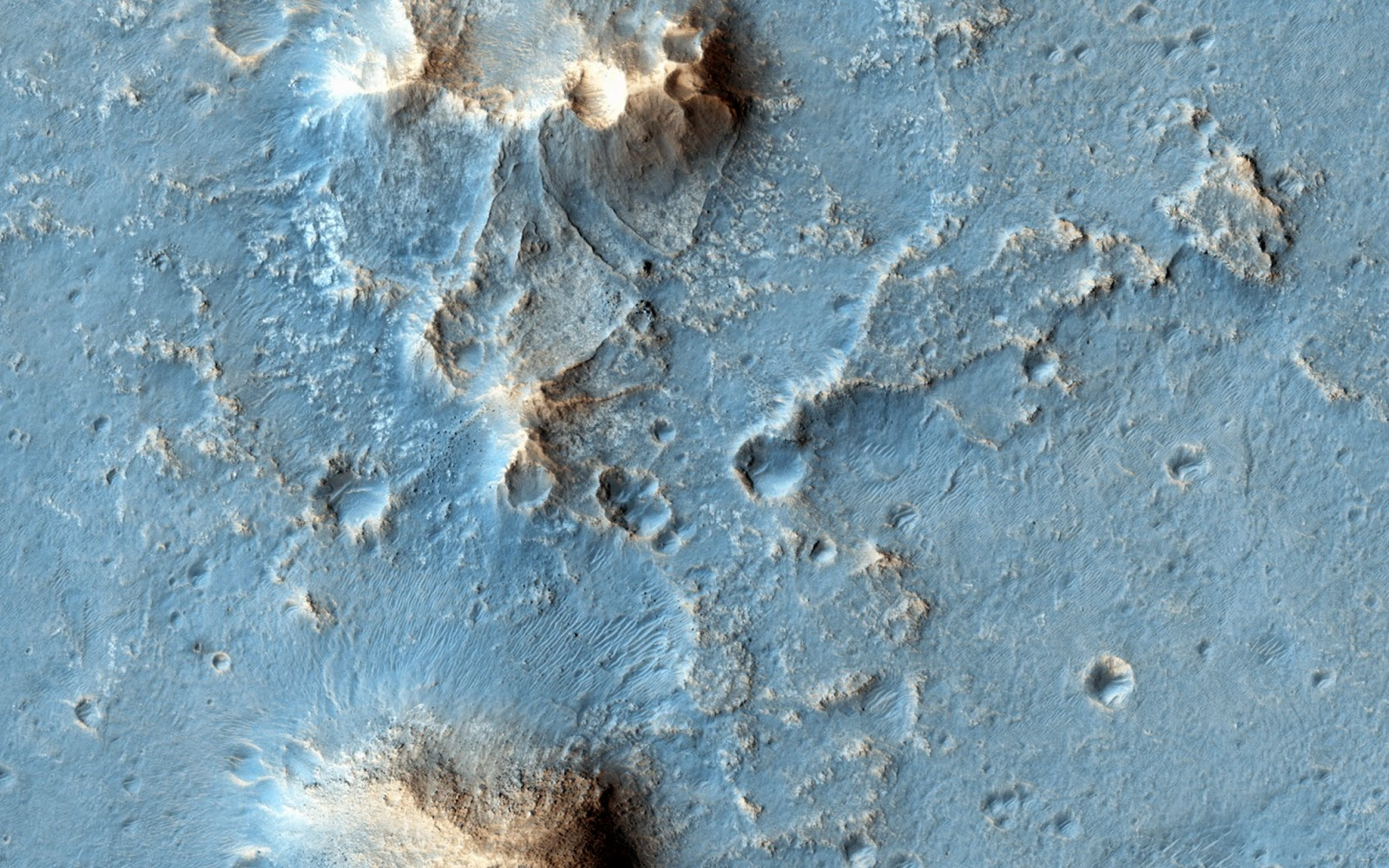
- Feature type: Plains
- Location: Oxia Palus quadrangle
- Coordinates: 18.275°N 335.368°E

Oxia Planum is a 200 km-wide clay-bearing plain located on the planet of Mars inside the Oxia Palus quadrangle on the eastern border of Chryse Planitia. The plain lies between the Mawrth Vallis outflow channel to the north-east and the Ares Vallis outflow channel to the south-west. In 2019, the International Astronomical Union Working Group for Planetary System Nomenclature officially approved Oxia Planum as a feature on the surface of Mars (near 18.275°N 335.368°E).

Oxia Planum was one of eight potential landing sites for the European Space Agency and Roscosmos ExoMars mission. After a five-year-long selection process, it was officially selected to be the landing site for Rosalind Franklin (rover). It met the rover landing criteria based on its latitude, elevation, surface slopes, and its Noachian-aged terrains. It was chosen because of its relatively smooth topography and its abundance of hydrated minerals.

== Overview ==
Oxia Planum contains one of the largest exposures of clay-bearing rocks on Mars. The age of the region was calculated to be from ~3.6 billion years old to ~4 billion years old. The site is iron-magnesium rich clays, indicating that water once played a role here. The site sits in an area of valley systems with the exposed rocks exhibiting different compositions, indicating a variety of deposition and wetting environments. Dark resistant units, named for being dark-toned erosion resistant areas, are spread across the surface of the site. The formation of the dark resistant units is hypothesized to have occurred from either fluvial deposits or by volcanic activity during the Amazonian period. The dark resistant units may have preserved the state of the older stratum beneath it.

Clay accumulation underneath the remnants of a fan or delta near the outlet of Coogoon Vallis may offer preservation for biosignatures against the planet's harsh radiation and oxidation environment.

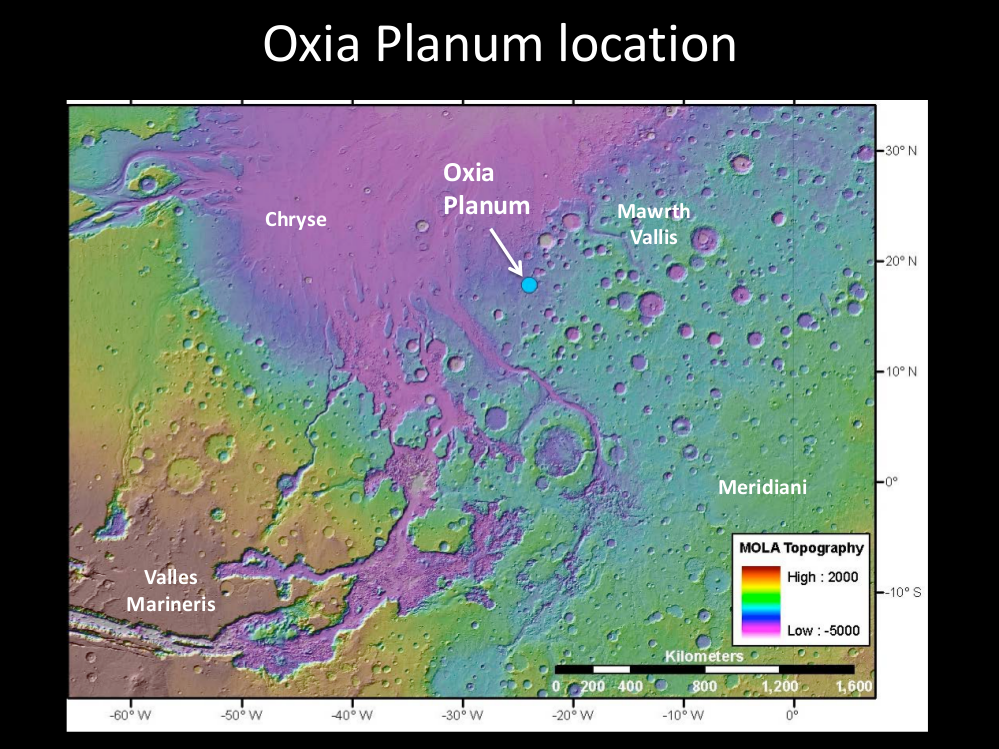
Oxia Planum - Location Map.

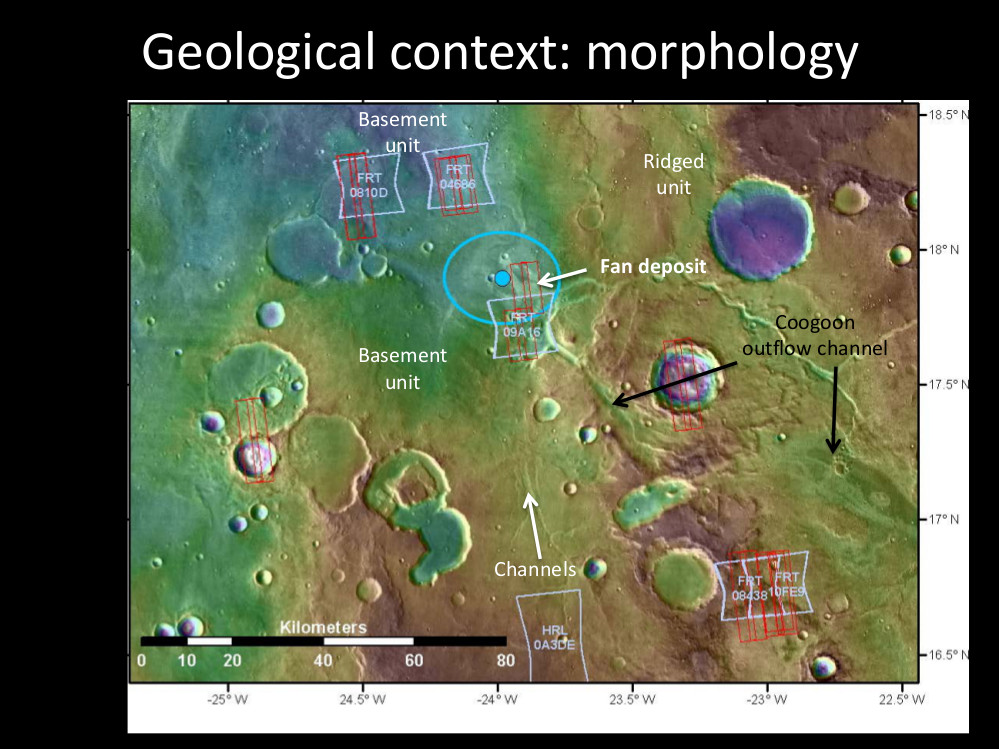
Oxia Planum - Geological Context - Morphology.

== Aeolian features ==
The aeolian features observed on Oxia Planum indicate a changing wind regime. The formation of periodic bedrock ridges (PBRs) is hypothesized to have occurred by exposure from erosion or by wind. The PBRs record the oldest wind period of the region and indicate a north-northeast or south-southeast wind direction. The formation of transverse aeolian ridges (TARs) occurred by wind. The TARs record a second wind period of the region and indicate a northwest or north-northwest to southeast or south-southeast wind direction. Dust devils and windstreaks from the modern wind period indicate a west-northwest to east-southeast and occasionally a north-northeast to south-southwest wind direction.

== See also ==
- Geography of Mars
- List of plains on Mars
