= Infrared Spectrometer for ExoMars =

- Operator: European Space Agency
- Manufacturer: Russian Space Research Institute
- Instrument type: near infrared spectrometer
- Function: surface composition
- Mission duration: ≥ 7 months
- Website: ExoMars Rover Instrument Suite

Properties
- Mass: 1.74 kg
- Dimensions: 16 × 8 × 9.6 cm
- Spectral band: near infrared (NIR)
- Data rate: 100 kbits per measurement

Host spacecraft
- Spacecraft: Rosalind Franklin rover
- Operator: European Space Agency

Infrared Spectrometer for ExoMars (ISEM) was an infrared spectrometer for remote sensing designed to be part of the science payload on board the European Space Agency's Rosalind Franklin rover, tasked to search for biosignatures and biomarkers on Mars. ISEM would provide context assessment of the surface mineralogy in the vicinity of the Rosalind Franklin rover for selection of potential astrobiological targets. The Principal Investigator was Oleg Korablev from the Russian Space Research Institute (IKI). The instrument's use on the rover was cancelled, together with other Russian contributions to the project, after Russian invasion of Ukraine in 2022 and it was replaced by the Welsh-built ENFYS.

== Overview ==
ISEM	Performance/units
Type	Infrared spectrometer
Field of view	1.3°
Spectral range	near infrared: 1.15 - 3.30 μm
Spectral resolution	from: 3.3 nm at 1.15 μm to: 28 nm at 3.30 μm
Filter	acousto-optic tunable filter (AOTF)
Detector cooler	Peltier cooler
RF power	5 W
RF range	23–82 MHz
Detector	InAs photodiode
Data volume	100 kbits per measurement
Max power consumption	14 W
Dimensions (optical module)	16.0 cm × 8.0 cm × 9.6 cm
Mass	1.74 kg

The Infrared Spectrometer for ExoMars (ISEM) was being developed by the Russian Space Research Institute (IKI). It would be the first instance of near-infrared spectroscopy (NIR) observations done from the Mars surface. The instrument would be installed on the Rosalind Franklin rover's mast to measure reflected solar radiation in the near infrared range for context assessment of the surface mineralogy in the vicinity of Rosalind Franklin for selection of potential astrobiological targets. As the number of samples obtained with the drill will be limited, the selection of high-value sites for drilling will be crucial. Working with PanCam (a high-resolution panoramic camera), ISEM would aid in the selection of potential targets, especially water-bearing minerals, for close-up investigations and drilling sites. ISEM could detect, if present, organic compounds, including evolving trace gases such as hydrocarbons like methane in the Martian atmosphere.

== Objectives ==
The stated science objectives of ISEM were:

- Geological investigation and study a composition of Martian soils in the uppermost few millimeters of the surface.
- Characterisation of the composition of surface materials, discriminating between various classes of silicates, oxides, hydrated minerals and carbonates.
- Identification and mapping of the distribution of aqueous alteration products on Mars.
- Real-time assessment of surface composition in selected areas, in support of identifying and selection of the most promising drilling sites.
- Studies of variations of the atmospheric dust properties and of the atmospheric gaseous composition.

== Development ==
ISEM was a derivative of the Lunar Infrared Spectrometer (LIS) being developed by the Russian Space Research Institute (IKI) in Moscow for the planned Luna-25 and Luna-27 Russian landers. Collaborating institutions included: Moscow State University, Main Astrophysical Observatory, National Academy of Sciences of Ukraine, the National Research Institute for Physicotechnical and Radio Engineering Measurements (VNIIFTRI) in Russia, Moscow State University, and the Aberystwyth University in United Kingdom. The science team includes researchers from Russia, France, Italy, Sweden, Germany, the United Kingdom, and Canada.

The instrument has been designed to specifically detect carbonates, oxalates, borates, nitrates, NH_{4}-bearing minerals, that are good indicators of past habitable conditions such as aqueous minerals. It was also designed to detect organic compounds, including polycyclic aromatic hydrocarbons (PAHs) and those containing aliphatic C-H molecules. In addition, ISEM could also detect seasonal frost, if present at the landing site, and it could be used to analyse the bore hole excavated by the ExoMars drill, if the rover backs away some distance.

== See also ==
- Astrobiology
- Life on Mars
