= Periodic Bedrock Ridges =

Periodic Bedrock Ridges (PBRs) are features of the surface geomorphology of Mars and formerly unknown on Earth, first described in a paper in the Journal of Geological Research - Planets, in March 2012, by Professor David R. Montgomery, Joshua L. Bandfield, and Scott K. Becker of the University of Washington. Periodic Bedrock Ridges (PBRs) have also been identified at the ExoMars 2022 landing site, Oxia Planum, which show that the landing site experienced multiple climatic changes in the Amazonian.

Evidence for sediment transport and erosion by wind is widespread over the surface of Mars today and was likely a major geomorphic process for much of its geological past. Although Martian surface features resembling aeolian dunes and ripples have been recognized since the Mariner and Viking missions, such features have been interpreted previously as active, indurated, or exhumed sedimentary forms.

The authors reported evidence based on High Resolution Imaging Science Experiment images flown on the Mars Reconnaissance Orbiter, that show some megaripple forms are eroded into cohesive substrate rather than being composed of loose granular material or fossilized dunes. Exposure of stratigraphic continuity within layered, cohesive material extending crest to trough through features with mean wavelengths of 18 metres (59 ft) to 51 metres (167 ft) demonstrates the primarily erosional formation of what they termed periodic bedrock ridges (PBRs). Thus, some surfaces on Mars previously considered to be covered by wind-deposited material are actually wind-carved exposures that offer insights into Martian history.

PBRs lack the distinctive streamlining associated with wind-parallel yardangs, and comparison of PBR orientation to yardangs, megayardangs, and active sedimentary dunes in the same vicinity confirm that these PBRs formed transverse (across, or 90 degrees) to prevailing winds. Observed wavelengths of PBRs are comparable to those predicted by a simple model for erosional wavelengths of periodic transverse bed forms owing to the spacing of flow separations within the flow. Recognition of these transverse aeolian erosional forms brings up the question of how widespread Martian PBRs are and how many have been misinterpreted as active or indurated (fossilized) sedimentary dunes.

PBRs are not known on Earth. Montgomery has said that there could be landforms on Earth that are somewhat similar to PBRs, but to date there's nothing exactly like it, largely because there are not many bedrock landscapes on Earth in which wind is the main erosion agent. "There are very few places ... where you have bedrock exposed at the surface where there isn't also water that is carving valleys, that's shaping the topography. Mars is a different planet, obviously, and the biggest difference is the lack of fluvial action, the lack of water working on the surface."
