= PanCam =

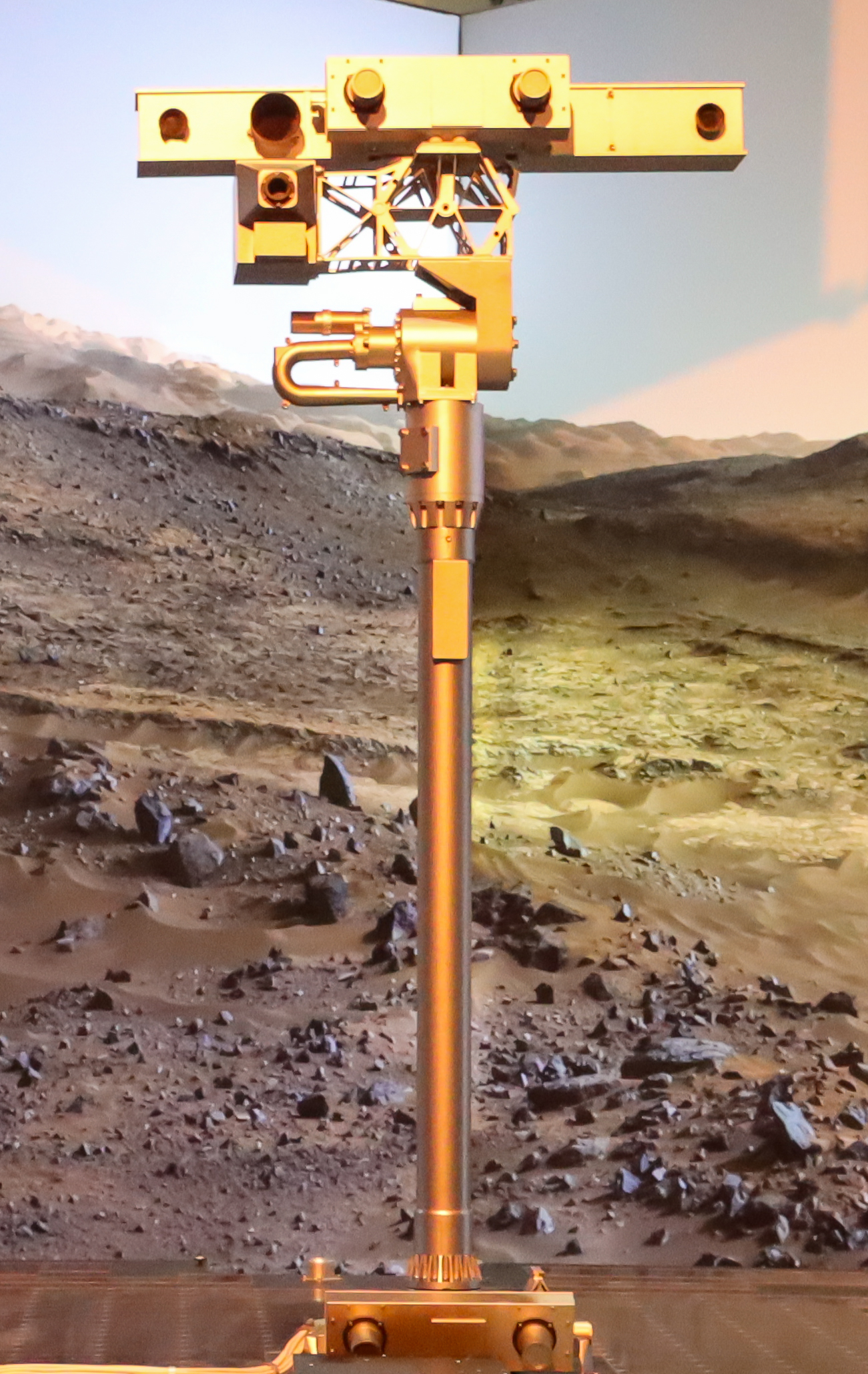
- Operator: ESA
- Manufacturer: ESA
- Instrument type: multispectral imaging
- Function: navigation and science
- Mission duration: ≥ 7 months
- Website: ExoMars Rover Instrument Suite

Properties
- Mass: 2.13 kg
- Power consumption: 9.2 W

Host spacecraft
- Spacecraft: Rosalind Franklin rover
- Operator: ESA

The PanCam (Panoramic Camera) assembly is a set of two wide angle cameras for multi-spectral stereoscopic panoramic imaging, and a high resolution camera for colour imaging that has been designed to search for textural information or shapes that can be related to the presence of microorganisms on Mars. This camera assembly is part of the science payload on board the European Space Agency's Rosalind Franklin rover, tasked to search for biosignatures and biomarkers on Mars. The rover is planned to be launched in August–October 2022 and land on Mars in spring 2023.

== Overview ==
This instrument will provide stereo multispectral images, of the terrain nearby. PanCam are the "eyes" of the rover and its primary navigation system. PanCam will also provide the geological context of the sites being explored and help support the selection of the best sites to carry out exobiology studies, as well as assist in some aspect of atmospheric studies. This system will also monitor the sample from the drill before it is crushed inside the rover, where the analytical instruments will perform a detailed chemical analysis.

The Principal Investigator is Professor Andrew Coates of the Mullard Space Science Laboratory, University College London in the United Kingdom.

== Description ==
Spectral parameter	Mineralogical
530 nm	Ferric minerals (hematite)
530 - 610 nm	Ferric minerals and dust
900 nm	Best NIR absorption ferric minerals
950 - 1000 nm	hydrated minerals
670 nm/440 nm ratio	Ferric minerals and dust
610 nm	Goethite mineral
950 nm	Hydrated minerals, some clays and silicates
440 - 670 nm	Related to degree of oxidation

PanCam design includes the following major components:

- Wide Angle Camera (WAC) pair, for multispectral stereoscopic panoramic imaging, using a miniaturized filter wheel. Both cameras have a focus range from 1 m to infinity.
- High Resolution Camera (HRC) for high-resolution color images. It has a focus range from 0.98 m to infinity, and it uses a 1 megapixel (1024 × 1024) STAR1000 radiation resistant detector. Its active focus capability allows for an eight-fold better resolution than the WACs.
- PanCam Interface Unit and DC-DC converter (PIU and DCDC) to provide a single electronic interface.
- PanCam Optical Bench (OB) to house PanCam and provide protection.

== See also ==
- Astrobiology
- Life on Mars
- Planetary habitability
