= Mawrth Vallis =

Valley on Mars

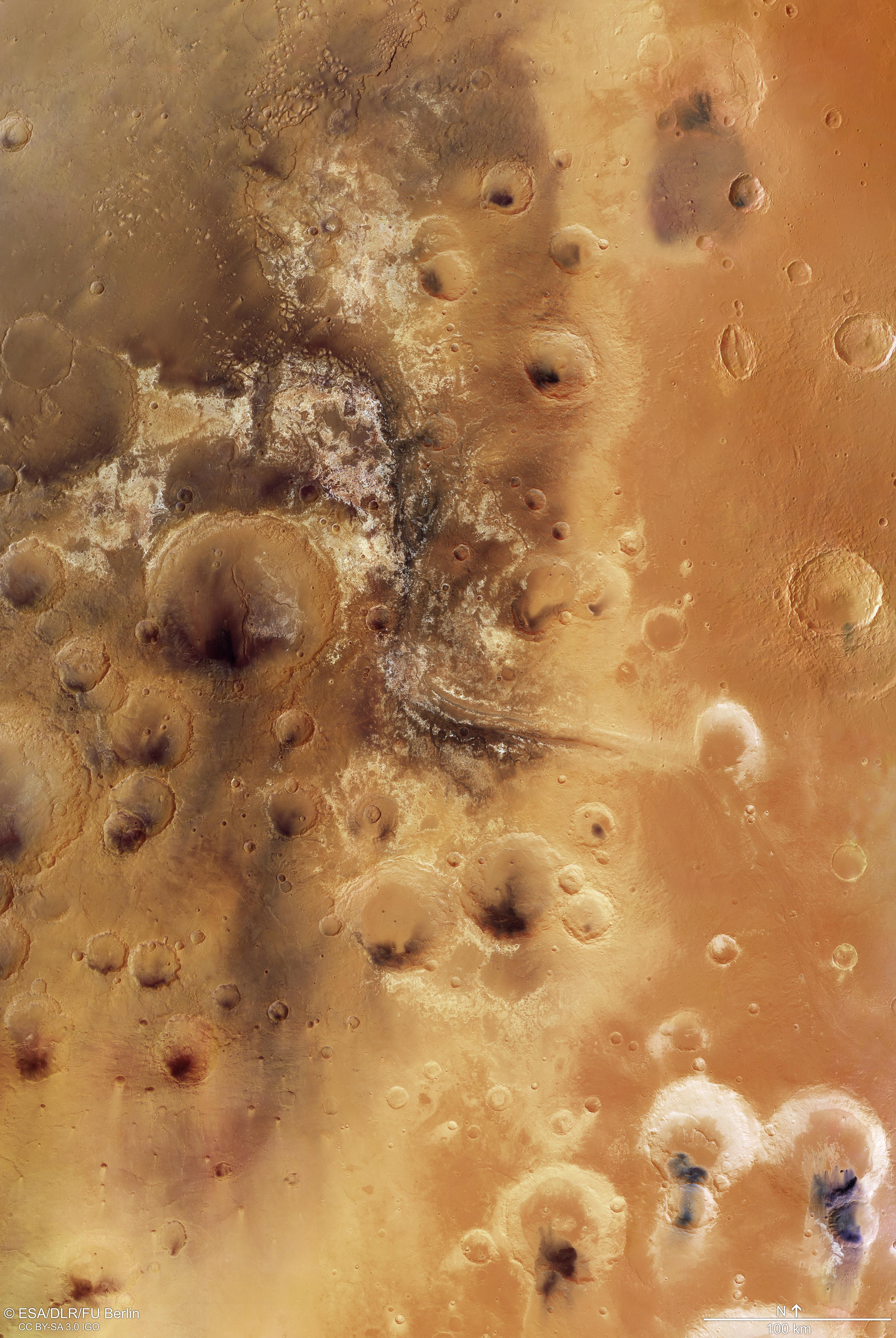
- Coordinates: 22.6°N 16.5°W
- Length: 636.0 km
- Naming: Welsh word for "Mars".

Mawrth Vallis (Welsh: [maurθ]) (Mawrth means "Mars" in Welsh) is a valley on Mars, located in the Oxia Palus quadrangle at 22.3°N, 343.5°E with an elevation approximately two kilometers below datum. Situated between the southern highlands and northern lowlands, the valley is a channel formed by massive flooding which occurred in Mars's ancient past. It is an ancient water outflow channel with light-colored clay-rich rocks.

Prior to the selection of Gale Crater for the Mars Science Laboratory (MSL) Curiosity rover mission, Mawrth Vallis was considered as a potential landing site because of the detection of a stratigraphic section rich in clay minerals. Clay minerals have implications for past aqueous environments as well as the potential to preserve biosignatures, making them ideal targets for the search for life on Mars. Although Mawrth Vallis was not chosen as a landing target, there is still interest in understanding the mineralogy and stratigraphy of the area. Until a rover mission is committed to exploring Mawrth Vallis, orbiters remain the only source of information. These orbiters consist of a number of spectrometers that contribute to our knowledge of Mawrth Vallis and the rest of the Martian surface.

== Overview and geology ==
One of the oldest valleys on Mars, Mawrth Vallis holds special interest because of the presence of phyllosilicate (clay) minerals which form only if water is available, first identified in data from the OMEGA spectrometer on the European Space Agency's Mars Express orbiter. Mars Reconnaissance Orbiter's Compact Reconnaissance Imaging Spectrometer for Mars has identified aluminium-rich and iron-rich clays, each with a unique distribution. Some of the clays recently discovered by the Mars Reconnaissance Orbiter are montmorillonite and kaolinite, alunite, and nontronite. Since some clays seem to drape over high and low areas, it is possible that volcanic ash landed in an open body of water. On Earth such clays occur in (among other environments) weathered volcanic rocks and hydrothermal systems, where volcanic activity and water interact. Mawrth Vallis was at one point considered as a landing site for the Mars Science Laboratory, which ultimately landed at Gale Crater. Clay minerals easily preserve microscopic life on Earth, so perhaps traces of ancient life may be found at Mawrth. It was considered a potential landing site for the Mars 2020 rover, but did not make the final cut.

The region is well studied with more than 40 papers published in peer-reviewed publications. Near the Mawrth channel is a 200 meter high plateau with many exposed layers. Spectral studies have detected clay minerals that present as a sequence of layers. Clay minerals were probably deposited in the Early to Middle Noachian period. Later weathering exposed a variety of minerals such as kaolin, alunite, and jarosite. Later, volcanic material covered the region. This volcanic material would have protected any possible organic materials from radiation.

== Exploration and investigations ==
=== Mars Global Surveyor ===
Mars Global Surveyor was the first orbiter launched by the US since 1976 when the Viking lander was sent to Mars. The purpose of Global Surveyor was to map the surface of Mars using the Mars Orbiter Camera (MOC), the Mars Orbiter Laser Altimeter (MOLA), the Thermal Emission Spectrometer (TES), and a Magnetometer. MOC could capture high resolution images ranging from 1.5 to 12 m per pixel. MOLA was used to provide topographic maps of Mars. TES uses six detectors to measure both thermal infrared and visible near infrared data which is used to identify the composition of the surface of Mars. TES has a resolution of 3 x 6 km, this is a much larger field of view when compared to future orbiters. This resolution does not provide detailed composition maps but does serve as a good baseline for understanding the makeup of martian rocks.

TES was able to provide thermal inertia information at Mawrth Vallis despite the low resolution. Thermal inertia compares daytime and nighttime infrared data to determine how well a surface holds heat. Objects with high thermal inertia (hold more heat) are either highly indurated, very dense, or have a large particle size while low thermal inertia represents fine grain particles such as dust. Mawrth Vallis has a thermal inertia that indicates the size of surface particles range from dusty to larger rocks.

=== 2001 Mars Odyssey ===
Odyssey is currently NASA's longest serving spacecraft at Mars and has been orbiting Mars since October 2001. Odyssey's primary purpose is to map the mineralogy of Martian surface but is also used to assess potential landing sites for rovers and landers. Odyssey consists of three instruments for measuring the surface of Mars; a Thermal Emission Imaging System (THEMIS), a Gamma Ray Spectrometer (GRS), and Mars Radiation Environment Experiment (MARIE). MARIE was damaged in 2003, most likely by a solar particle, and GRS is not in use after Odyssey changed its orbit in 2008 to increase THEMIS sensitivity. In addition to the onboard spectrometers, Odyssey serves as a communication relay between Earth and the rovers and landers on Mars's surface.

==== THEMIS ====
THEMIS detects infrared reflectance of ten spectral bands which are used for identifying the composition of the Martian surface. Using multiple-spectra allows Odyssey to better characterize the minerals found on Mars. THEMIS is similar to TES on the Mars Global Surveyor but has a lower spectral resolution (10 bands compared to TES's 143 bands) but has an increased spatial resolution (100 m compared to 3 x 6 km on TES) Odyssey is searching for terrains that represent past water, so the increased special resolution and narrow spectral resolution are targeting hydrated minerals.

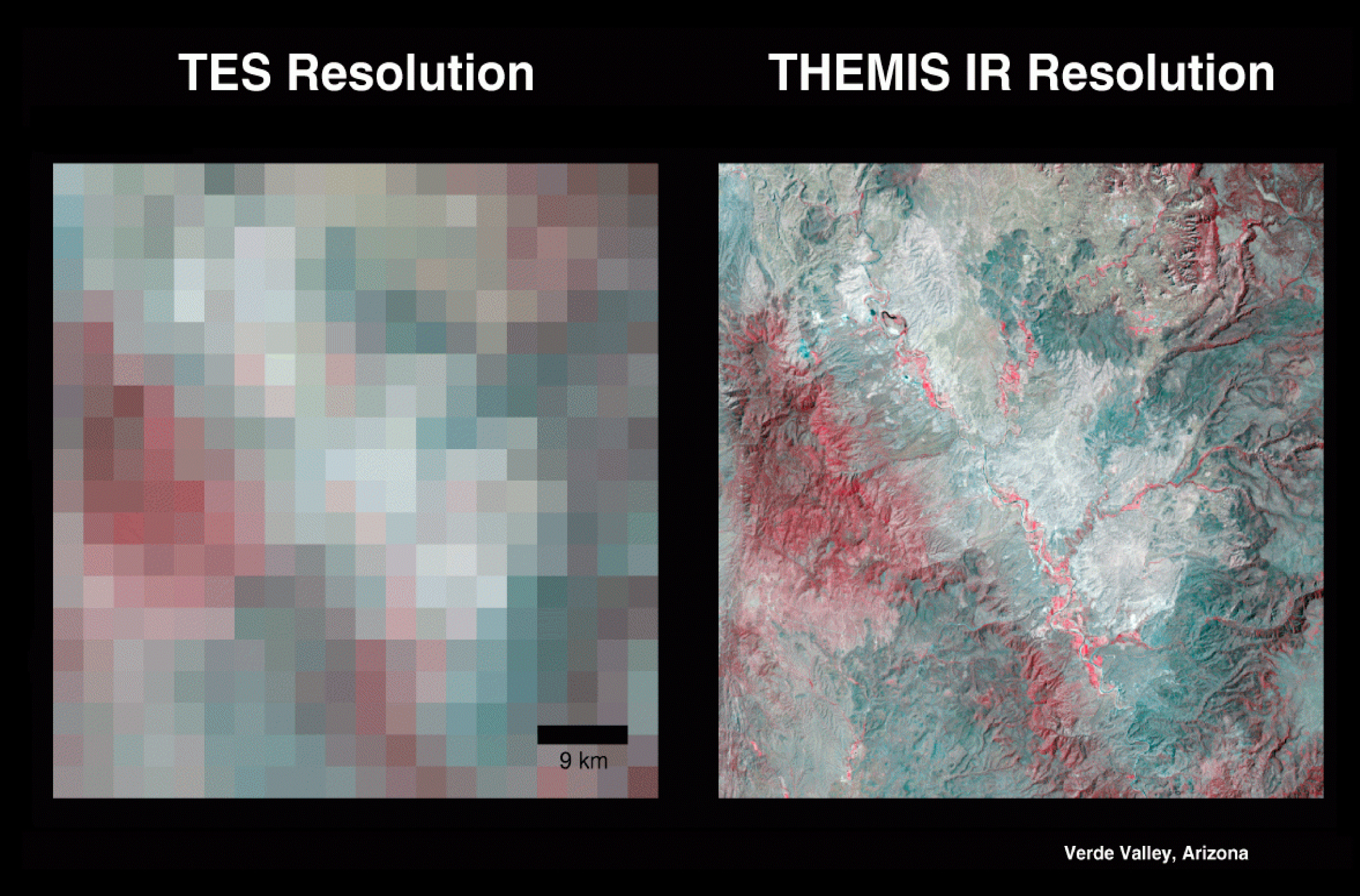
Comparison of TES and THEMIS spatial resolution.

==== Gamma Ray Spectrometer (GRS) ====
The GRS is used to measure the abundance of elements on the surface of Mars. Gamma rays can be measured when cosmic rays hit the surface and cause elements to emit identifiable signatures of energy (gamma rays). Measuring these gamma rays allows for the calculation of various element abundances. Water has been inferred by calculating the abundance of hydrogen . The GRS is separated from the main body of Odyssey by a 20 ft boom to reduce interference caused by the orbiter.

==== Odyssey at Mawrth Vallis ====
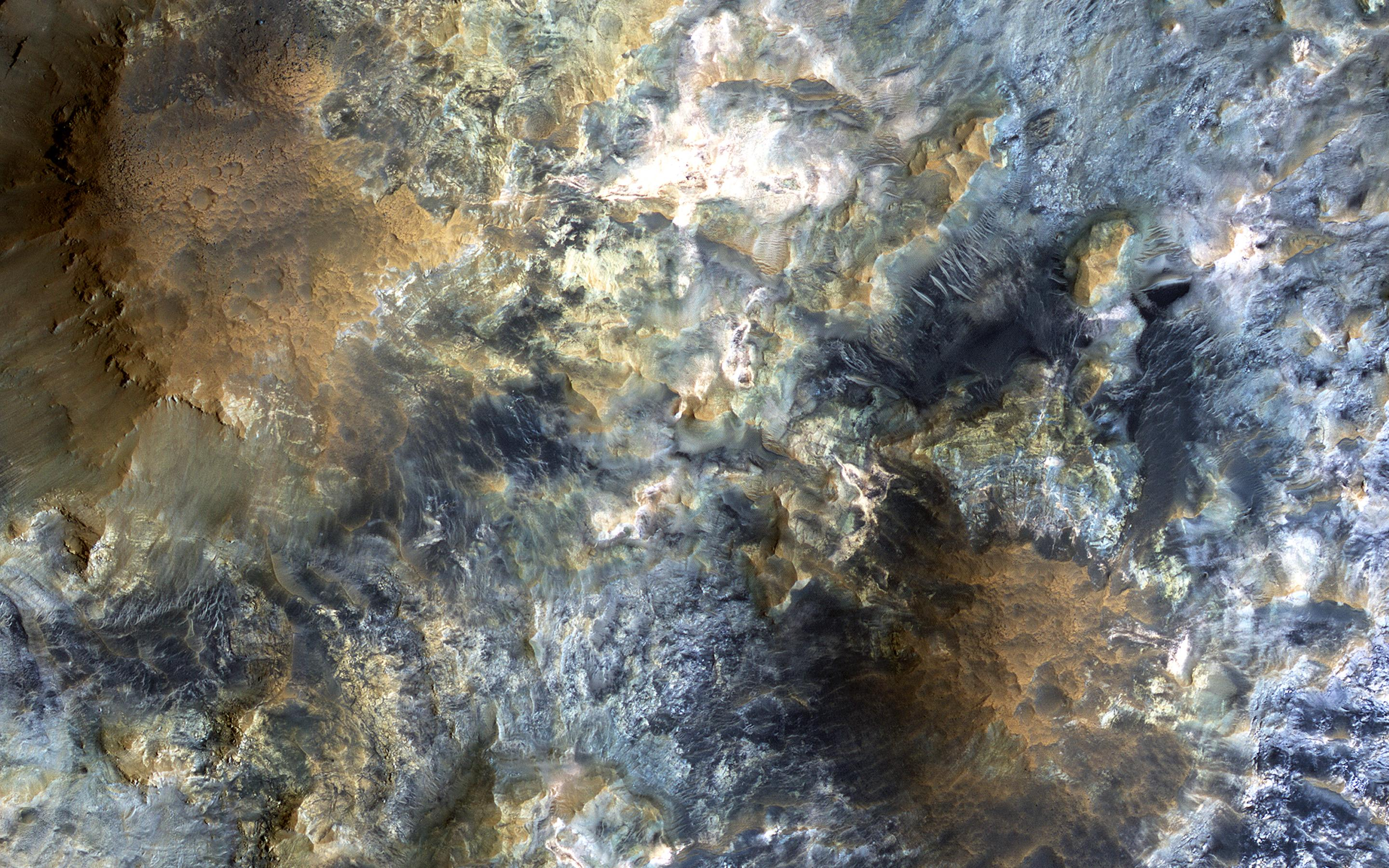
Colour variations in Mawrth Vallis are among the most spectacular on Mars.

THEMIS detected hydrated minerals at Mawrth Vallis and also provided images of a large outflow channel which stretches over 400 miles and 9 miles wide. The evidence for past water documented by Odyssey generated interest in landing the Mars Science Laboratory within Mawrth. Although Gale Crater was chosen, there is still interest in landing a rover at Mawrth Vallis and it had been suggested for the future 2020 rover landing site.

=== Mars Express ===
Mars Express was a two-part mission consisting of the Mars Express Orbiter and Beagle 2 lander launched in June 2003. While the lander portion of the mission failed, the orbiter is still in use. The Mars Express Orbiter consists of three instruments with the purpose of analyzing the surface and subsurface of Mars: the High Resolution Stereo Camera (HRSC), Observatoire pour la Minéralogie, l'Eau, les Glaces et l'Activité (OMEGA), and the Mars Advance Radar for Subsurface and Ionosphere Sounding (MARSIS). Additionally there are three instruments used for atmosphere analysis.

==== OMEGA ====
OMEGA is a mineralogical mapping spectrometer that has channels to detect visible (0.5–1.0 µm) and infrared (1.0–5.2 µm) wavelengths with a special resolution of 100 m. Both channels have a telescope, a spectrometer, and an optical device which focuses light. Visible light is focused onto a charge coupled device and infrared is focused to an InSb multi detector. OMEGA was designed to work in collaboration with the other instruments on Mars Express, specifically the Planetary Fourier Spectrometer (PFS).

OMEGA has been used to identify the mineralogy and understand the stratigraphy of Mawth Vallis. Large outcrops of phyllosillicate-rich units have been discovered and are exposed throughout the Mawrth Vallis region at a meter scale. OMEGA has distinguished two types of phyllosilicates which are likely to be montmorillonite and nontronite based on known spectra. From OMEGA's perspective, Mawrth Vallis contains the highest abundance of phyllosilicates on Mars and has up to 65% of smectites in volume.

=== Mars Reconnaissance Orbiter ===
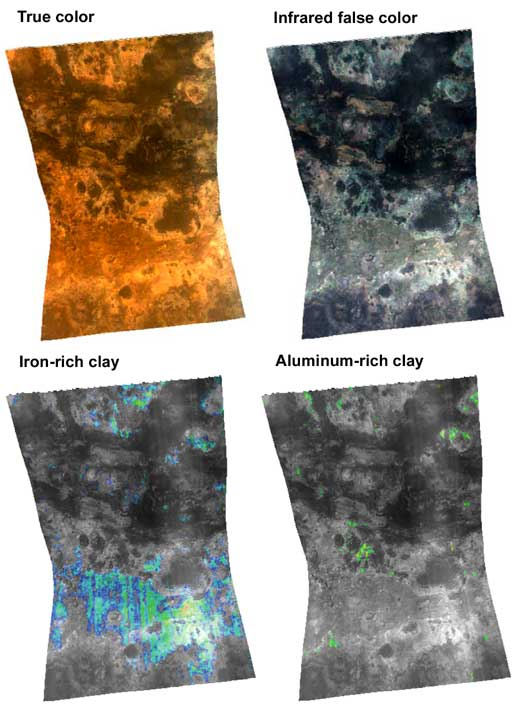
CRISM Visible and IR images of Mawrth Vallis. Top left: True color visible image of Mawrth Vallis. Top right: False color infrared reflectance. Bottom left: Detection of an Fe-rich smectite, nontronite, found primarily in the lower elevations of Mawrth Vallis. Bottom right: Detection of an Al-rich smectite, montmorillonite, found primarily at higher elevations than nontronite.

Mars Reconnaissance Orbiter consists of radar, three cameras, and two spectrometers. The Compact Reconnaissance Imaging Spectrometer for Mars (CRISM) is a visible and near infrared spectrometers that is designed to map the surface mineralogy of Mars at a resolution of 18m. The Mars Climate Sounder (MCS) is MRO's second spectrometer and uses visible and near infrared light and take measurements in 5 km strips which are compiled into daily maps used to monitor weather conditions on Mars.

==== CRISM ====
CRISM's mission is to detect aqueous and hydrothermal deposits while mapping the geology, stratigraphy, and composition of the Martian surface. Mawrth Vallis is a prime target because of the clay minerals previously detected by OMEGA. CRISM has the ability to map these clay minerals at a higher resolution, providing more detailed maps of aqueous minerals detected on Mars as well as detection of minerals which are undetectable at OMEGA's resolution. Fe/Mg-smectites are the dominant spectra detected by CRISM at Mawrth Vallis with spectra falling between nontronite, an Fe-smectite, and hectorite, a Mg-smectite. Montmorillonite, an Al-smectite, and hydrated silica have similar infrared reflectance spectrums and both were detected by CRISM at Mawrth Vallis.

CRISM data is used in conjunction with visible images and elevation data recorded by MRO, detailed maps of the surface mineralogy have been produced. These maps show a nontronite and hectorite are found commonly in the lower elevations of Mawrth Vallis while montmorillonite and other hydrated silicates are at higher elevations surrounding nontronite and hectorite. These observations suggest nontronite and hectorite were formed as alteration products in an aqueous environment but montmorillonite was likely to form at a later time during a separate aqueous event.

=== Future missions ===
In the year 2020, NASA launched Mars 2020, hosting a rover based on the Mars Science Laboratory that landed at Gale Crater. Mawrth Vallis was considered as a landing site, but was not among the final three potential landing sites, with Jezero Crater ultimately being chosen. Orbiter observations have shown that there are hydrated minerals at Mawrth Vallis which indicate an aqueous past.

Mawrth Vallis was also one of two finalists in the landing site selection process for the European Space Agency's future ExoMars Rover. As Exomars Rover will look for past life indicators, it was a good candidate, but it was deemed that Oxia Planum site would provide an equally interesting science ground while being a safer place to land and explore.

== See also ==
- List of valleys on Mars
