= Amazonis quadrangle =

Map of Mars

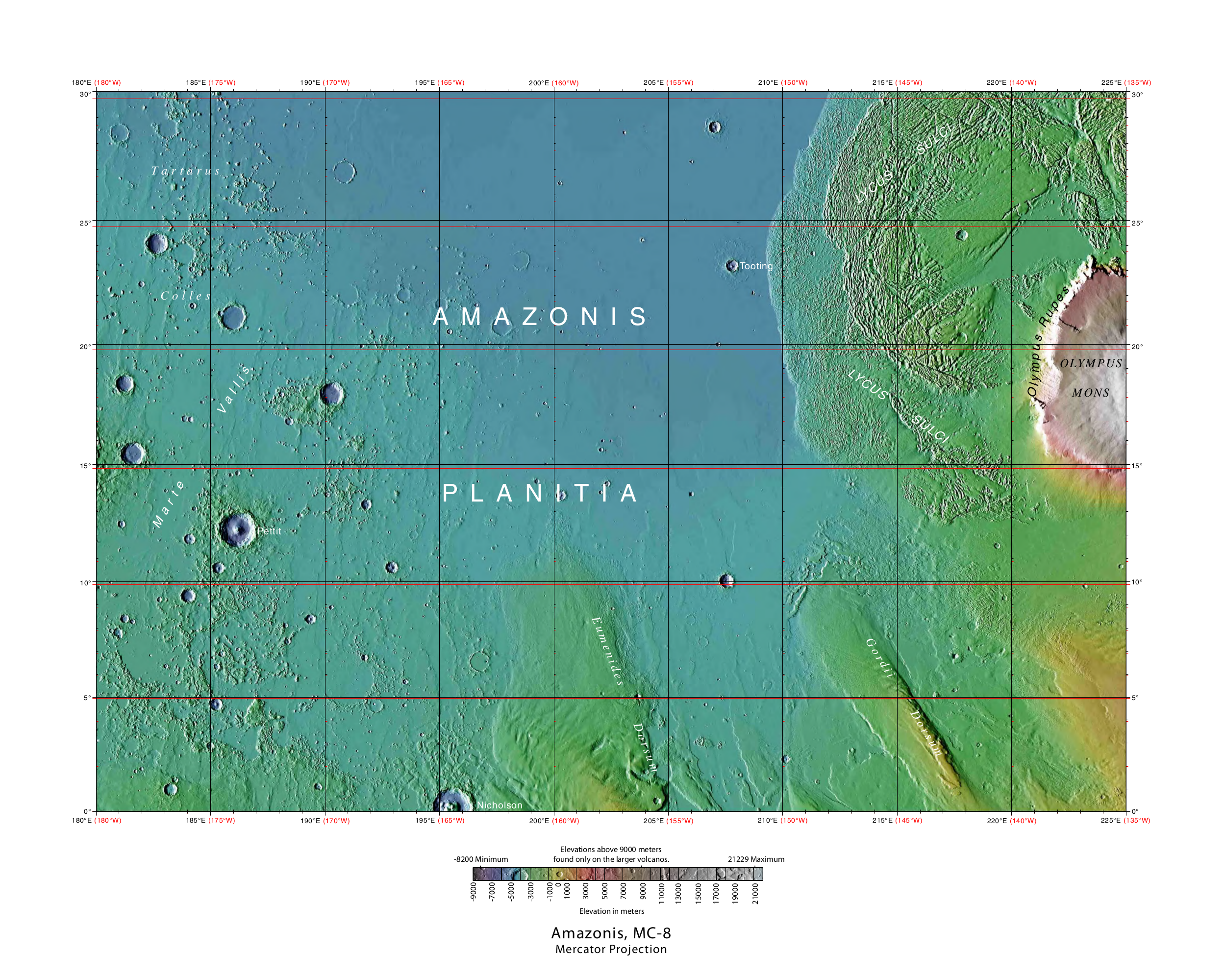
- Map of Amazonis quadrangle from Mars Orbiter Laser Altimeter (MOLA) data. The highest elevations are red and the lowest are blue.
- Coordinates: 15°N 157.5°W

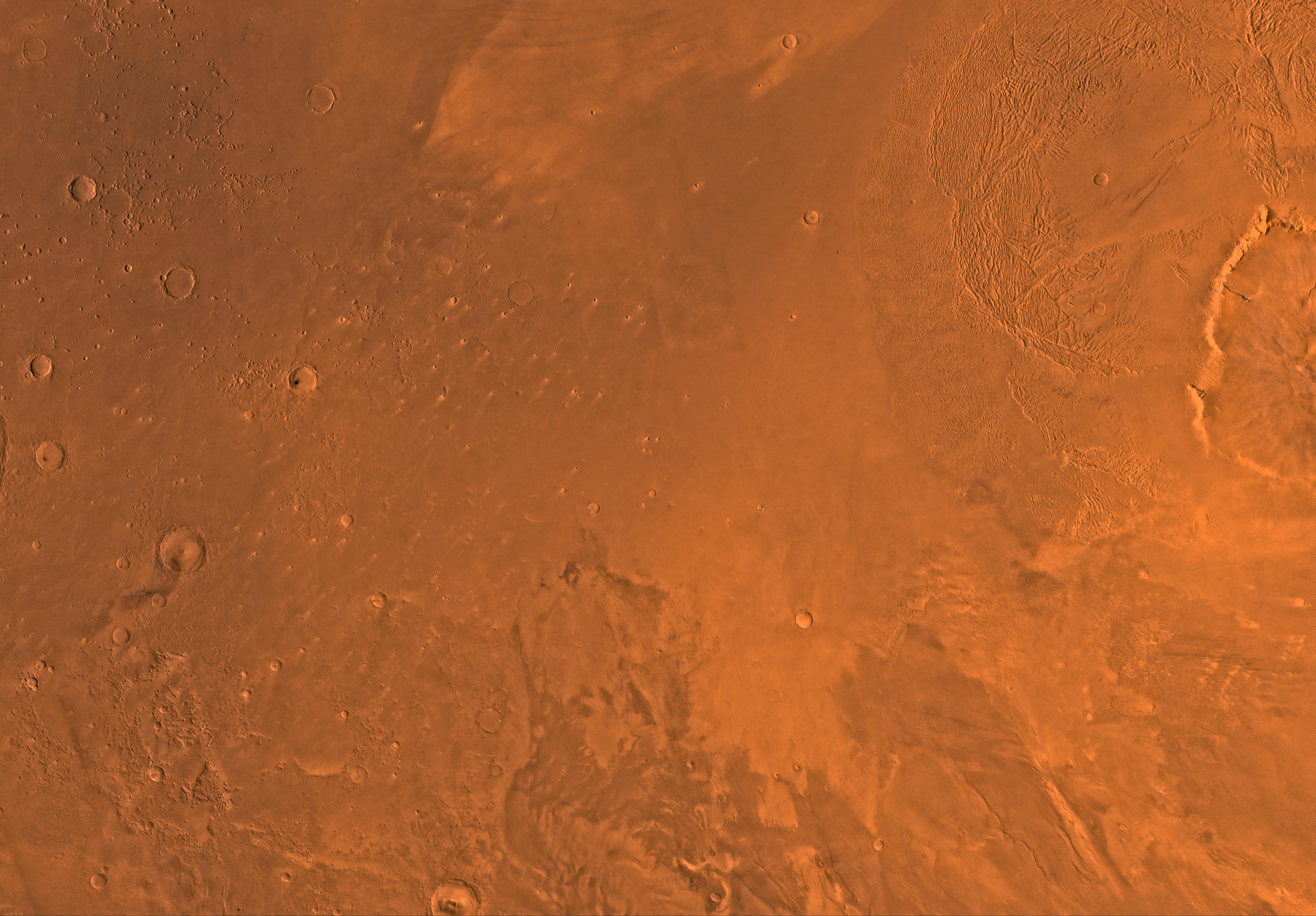
Image of the Amazonis Quadrangle (MC-8). The central part contains Amazonis Planitia and the eastern part includes the western flank of the largest known volcano in the Solar System, Olympus Mons.

The Amazonis quadrangle is one of a series of 30 quadrangle maps of Mars used by the United States Geological Survey (USGS) Astrogeology Research Program. The Amazonis quadrangle is also referred to as MC-8 (Mars Chart-8).

The quadrangle covers the area from 135° to 180° west longitude and 0° to 30° north latitude on Mars. The Amazonis quadrangle contains the region called Amazonis Planitia. This area is thought to be among the youngest parts of Mars because it has a very low density of craters. The Amazonian Epoch is named after this area. This quadrangle contains special, unusual features called the Medusae Fossae Formation and Sulci.

== Medusae Fossae Formation ==
The Amazonis quadrangle is of great interest to scientists because it contains a big part of a formation, called the Medusae Fossae Formation. It is a soft, easily eroded deposit that extends for nearly 1,000 km along the equator of Mars. The surface of the formation has been eroded by the wind into a series of linear ridges called yardangs. These ridges generally point in direction of the prevailing winds that carved them and demonstrate the erosive power of Martian winds. The easily eroded nature of the Medusae Fossae Formation suggests that it is composed of weakly cemented particles, and was most likely formed by the deposition of wind-blown dust or volcanic ash. Using a global climate model, a group of researchers headed by Laura Kerber found that the Medusae Fossae Formation could have easily been formed from ash from the volcanoes Apollinaris Mons, Arsia Mons, and possibly Pavonis Mons. Another piece of evidence for a fine-grained composition is that the area gives almost no radar return. For this reason it has been called a "stealth" region. Layers are seen in parts of the formation. Images from spacecraft show that they have different degrees of hardness probably because of significant variations in the physical properties, composition, particle size, and/or cementation. Very few impact craters are visible throughout the area so the surface is relatively young. Researchers found that nearly all the dust in that coats everything and is in the atmosphere has its origin in the Medusae Fossae formation. It turns out that the chemical elements (sulfur and chlorine) in this formation, in the atmosphere, and covering the surface are the same. The amount of dust on Mars is sufficient to form a 2 to 12 meters thick layer over the entire planet. Since there are relatively few depositional features in the Medusae Fossae Formation, most of the materials being eroded are probably small enough to be suspended in the atmosphere and transported long distances.

An analysis of data from the 2001 Mars Odyssey Neutron Spectrometer revealed that parts of the Medusae Fossae Formation contain water.

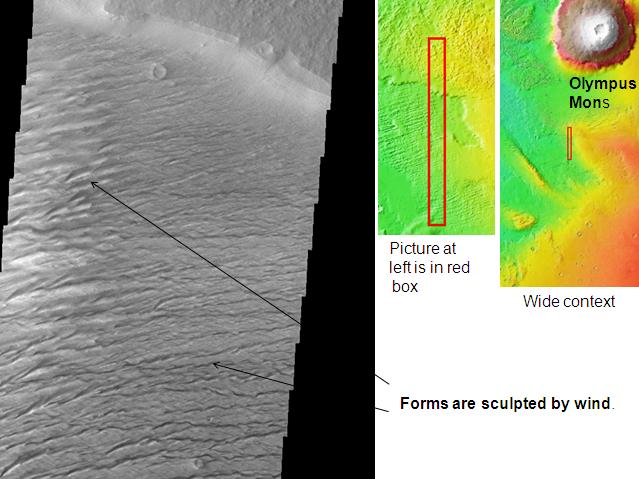
Medusae Fossae Formation and its location relative to Olympus Mons, as seen by THEMIS

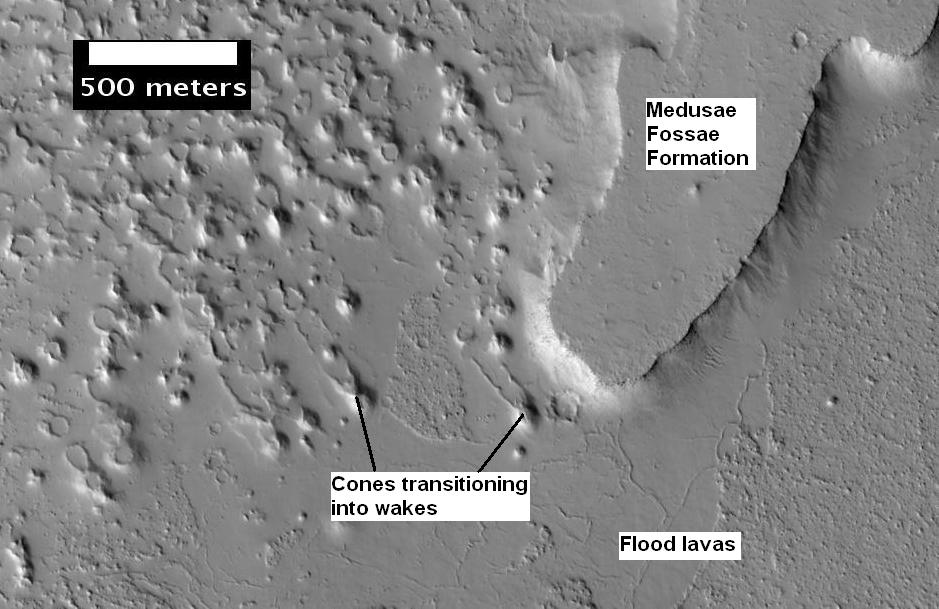
Plateau made up of Medusae Fossae materials and rootless cones, as seen by HiRISE

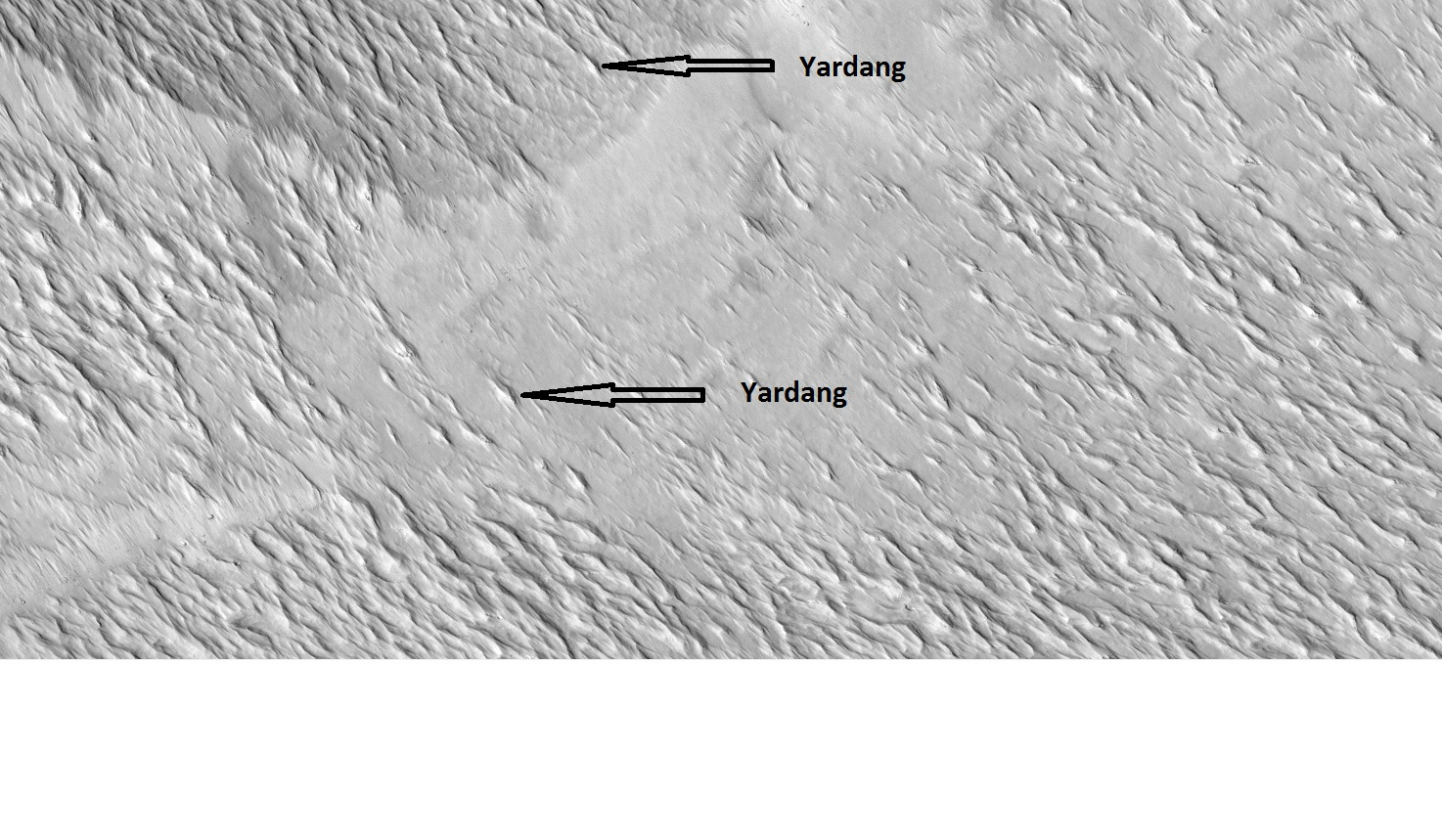
Yardangs in the Medusae Fossae formation, as seen by HiRISE under HiWish program

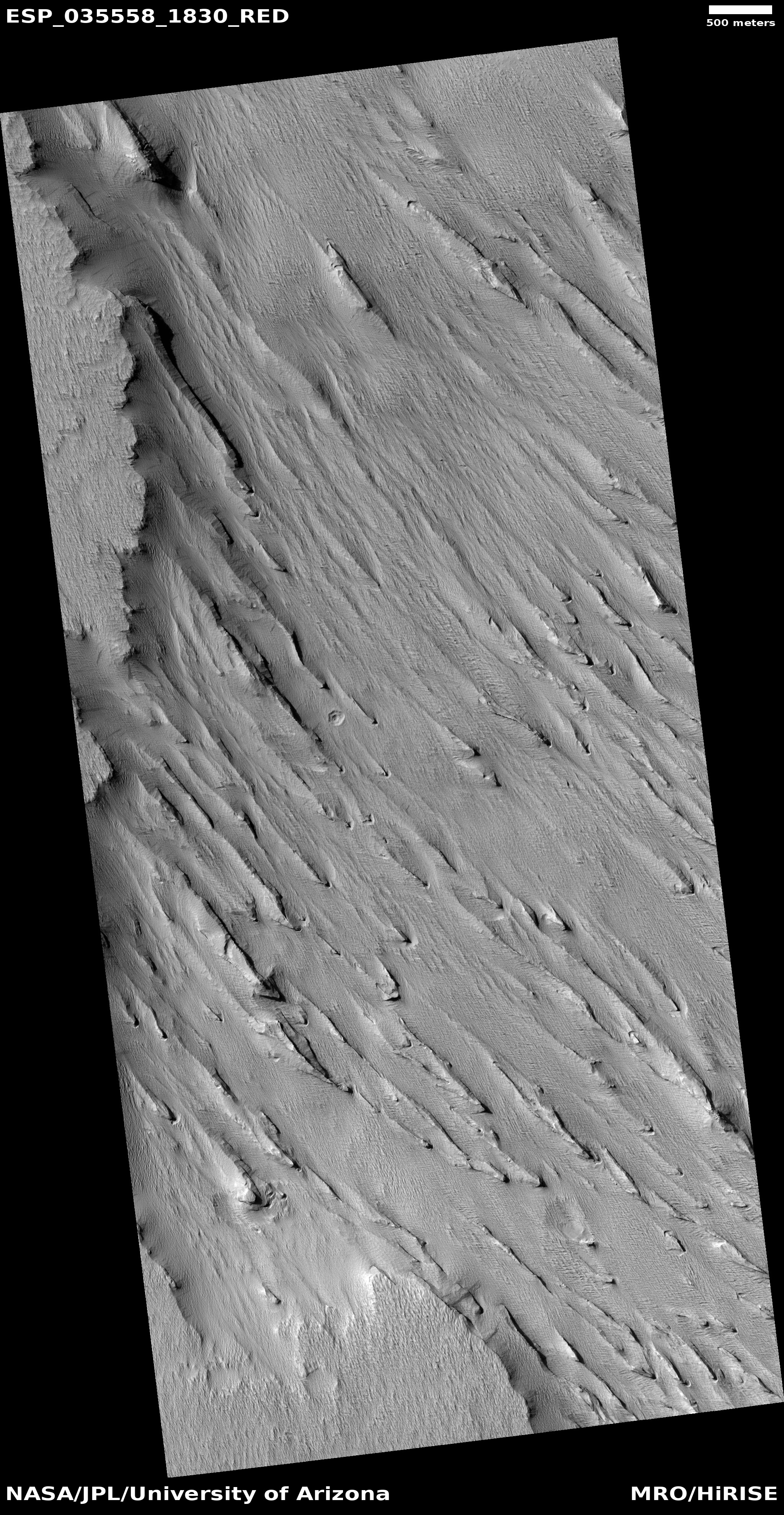
Yardangs, as seen by HiRISE under HiWish program Location is near Gordii Dorsum in the Amazonis quadrangle. These yardangs are in the upper member of the Medusae Fossae Formation.

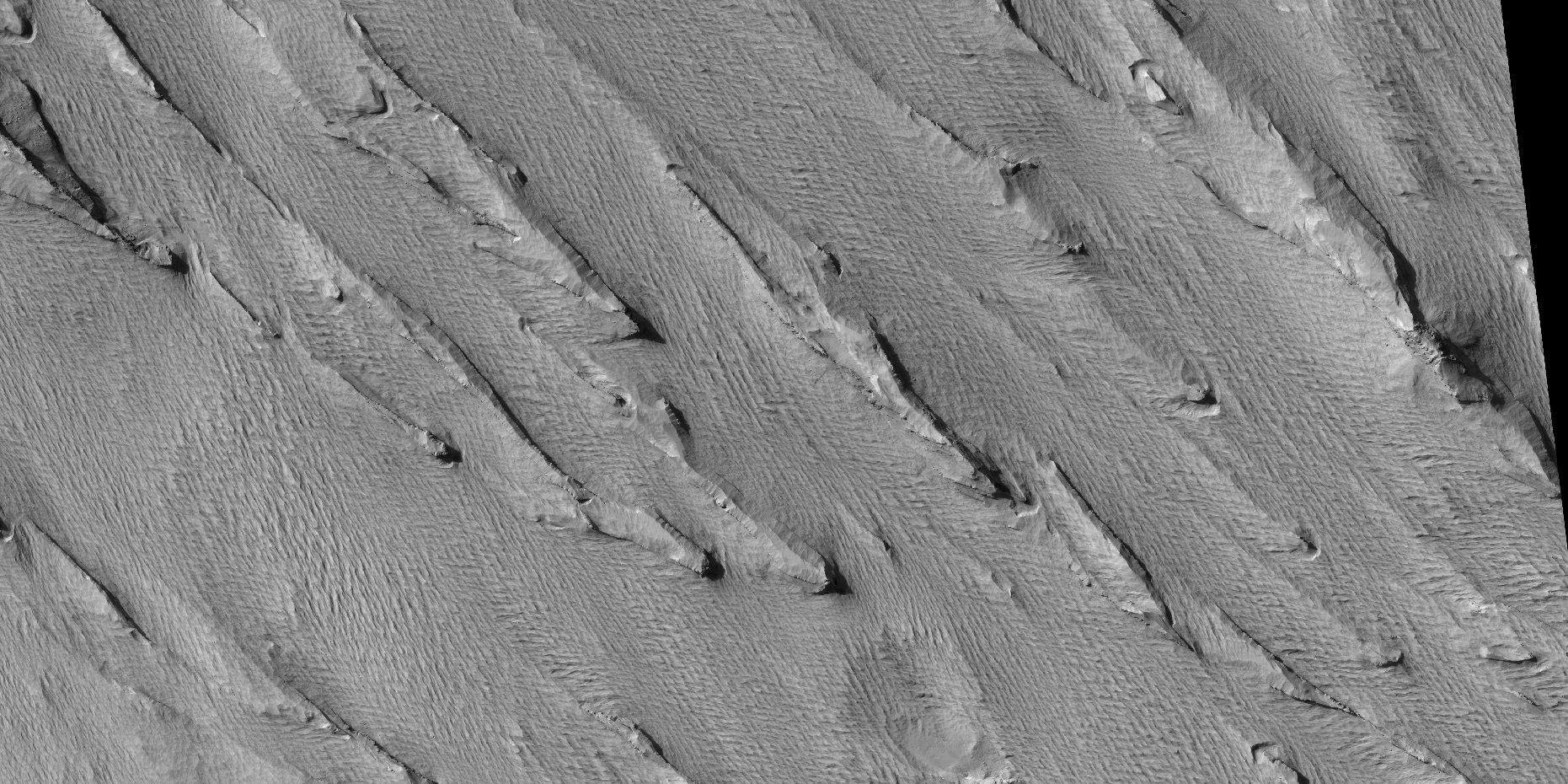
Yardangs, as seen by HiRISE under HiWish program. Location is near Gordii Dorsum in the Amazonis quadrangle. Note: this is an enlargement of previous image.

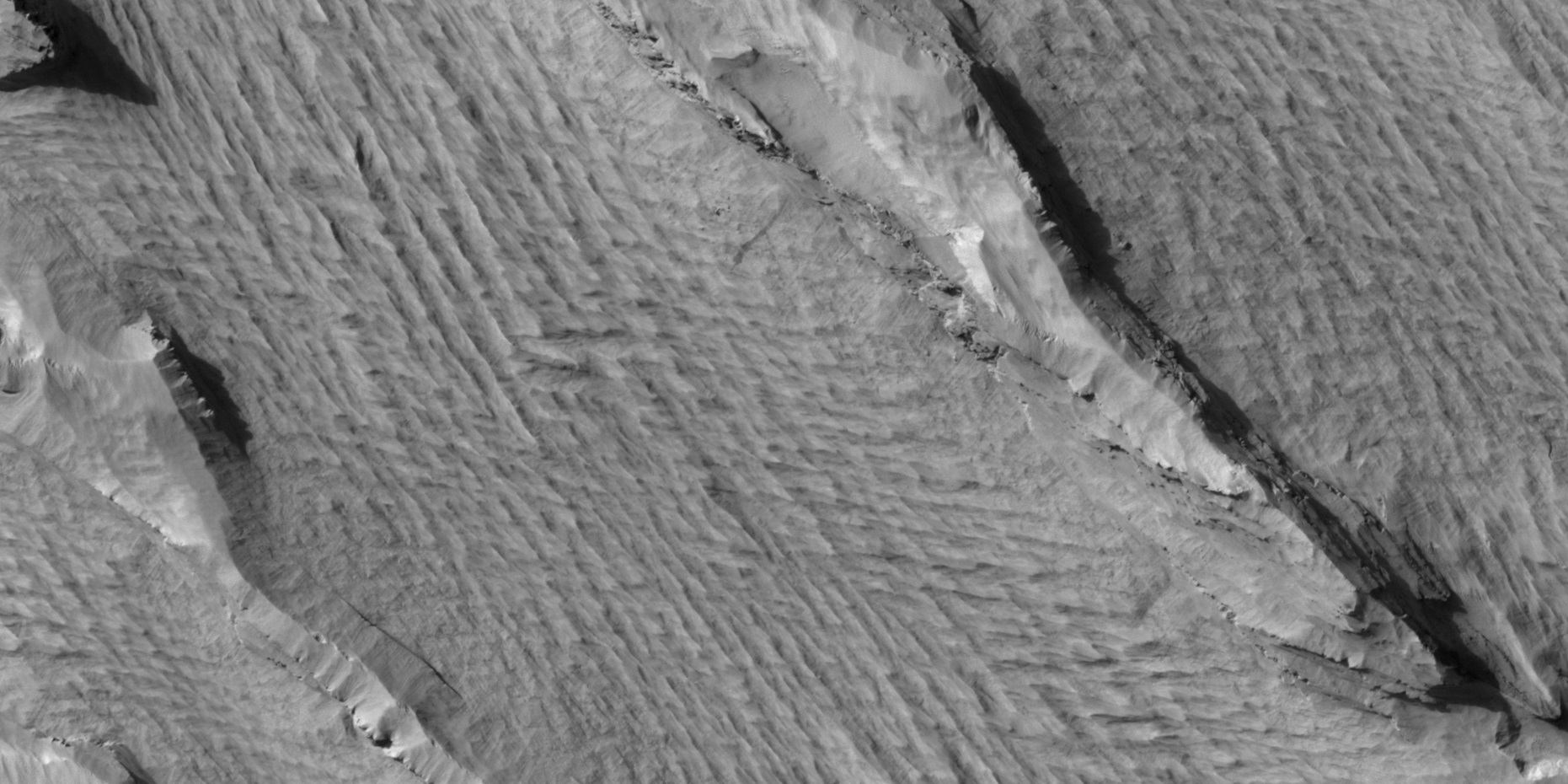
Yardangs, as seen by HiRISE under HiWish program. Location is near Gordii Dorsum in the Amazonis quadrangle. Note: this is an enlargement of previous image.
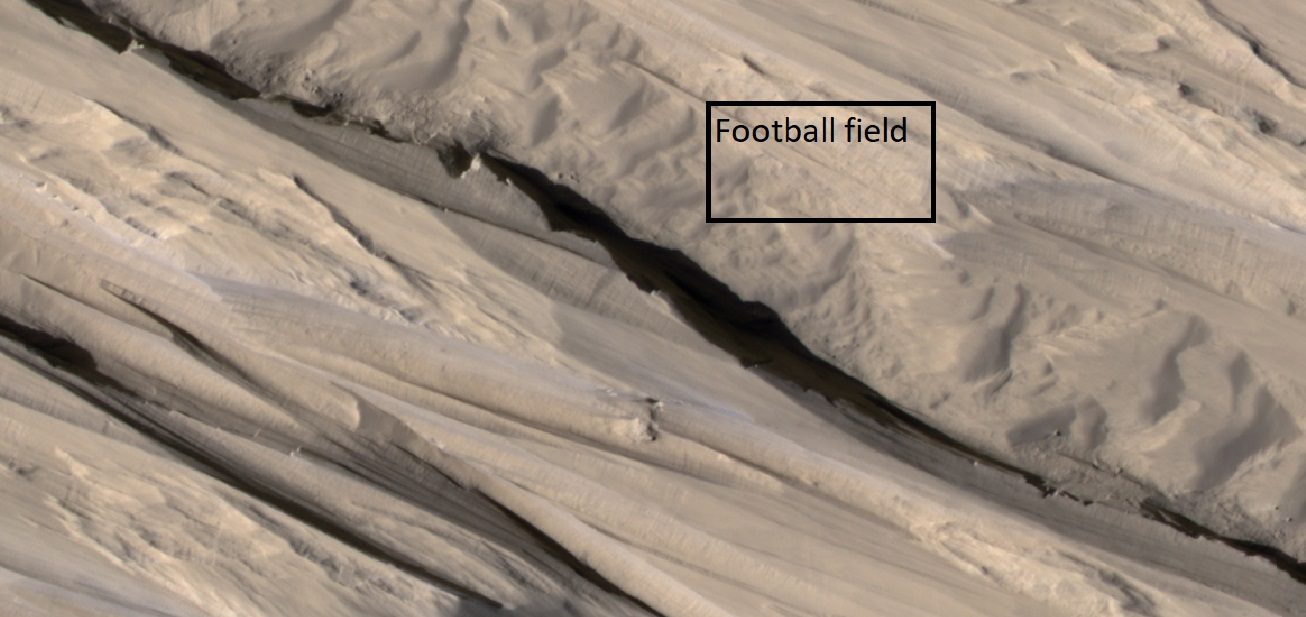
Close, color view of yardangs, as seen by HiRISE under HiWish program. Box shows size of a football field.

== Sulci ==
A very rugged terrain extends from the base of Olympus Mons. It is called Lycus Sulci. Sulci is a Latin term for the furrows on the surface of a brain, so Lycus Sulci has many furrows or grooves. The furrows are huge—up to a full kilometer deep. It would be extremely difficult to walk across it or to land a space ship there. A picture of this area is shown below.

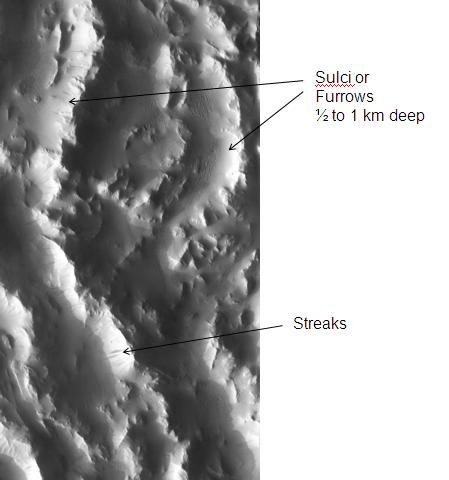
Sulci in Amazonis, as seen by THEMIS. "Sulci" in Mars geography language means a furrow, like a furrow on a brain's surface. This Sulci came from the basal scarp of Olympus Mons.

Lycus Sulci, as seen by HiRISE. Click on image for a better view of dark slope streaks.

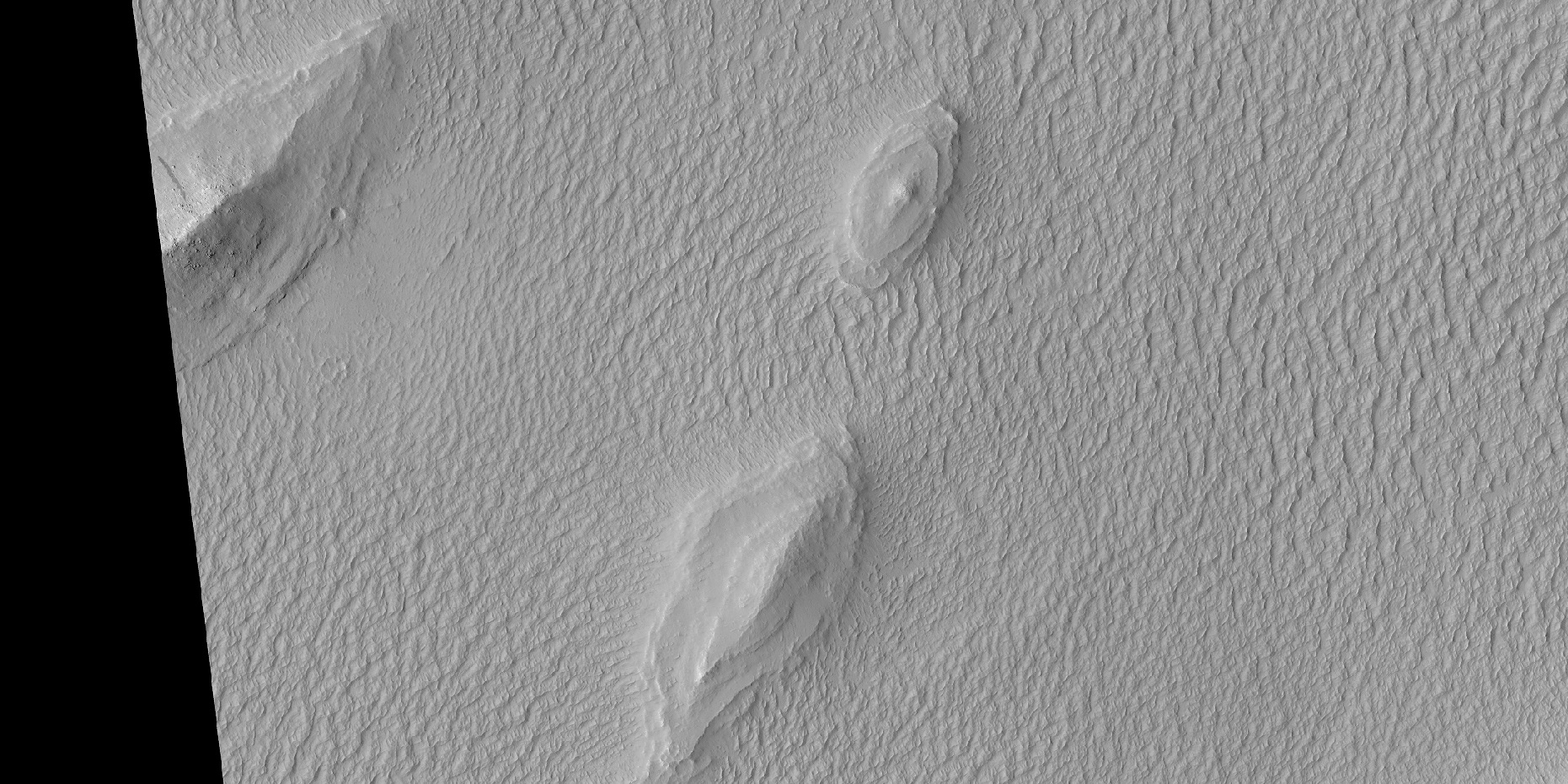
Layered features in Lycus Sulci, as seen by HiRISE under HiWish program

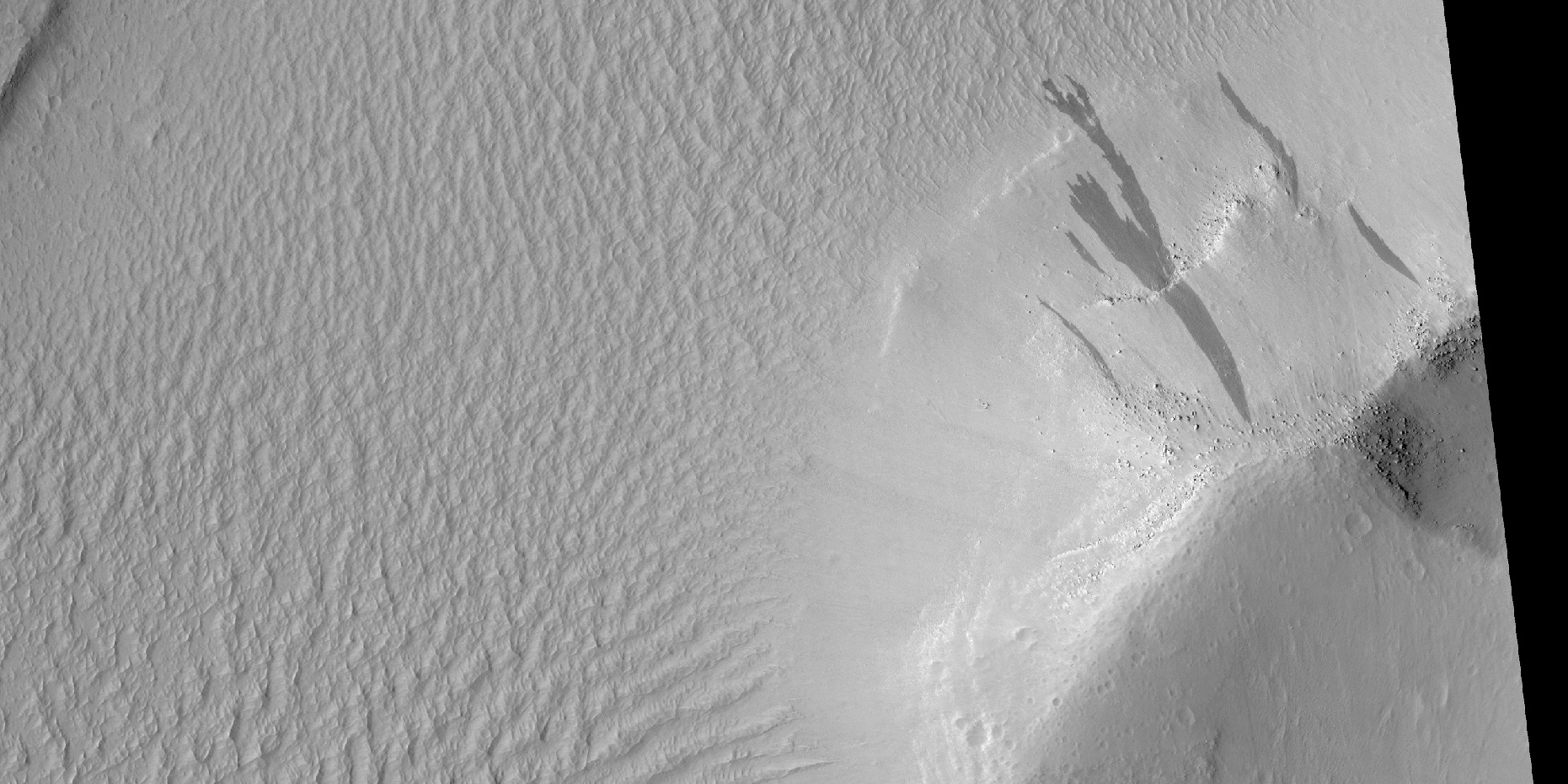
Dark slope streaks on mound in Lycus Sulci, as seen by HiRISE under HiWish program

== Columnar Jointing ==
Lava flows sometimes cool to form large groups of more-or-less equally sized columns. The resolution of the HiRISE images is such that the columns were found in various locations in 2009.

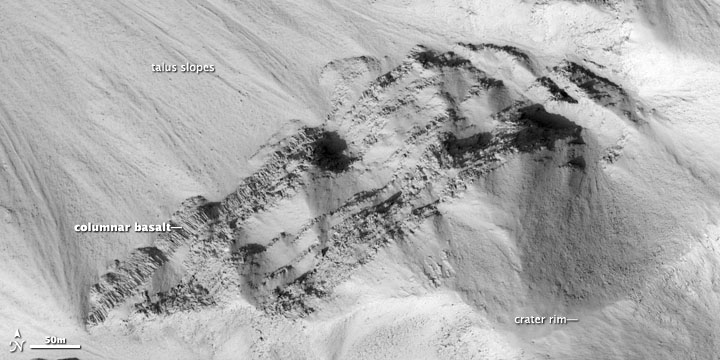
Columnar jointing in a crater in Marte Vallis

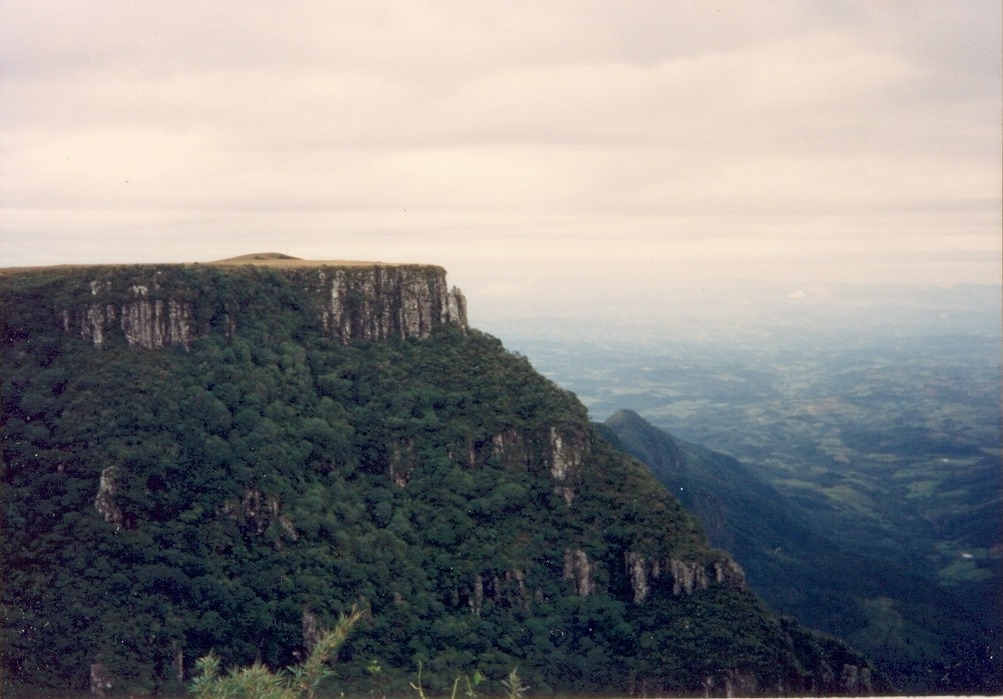
Columnar jointing on Earth

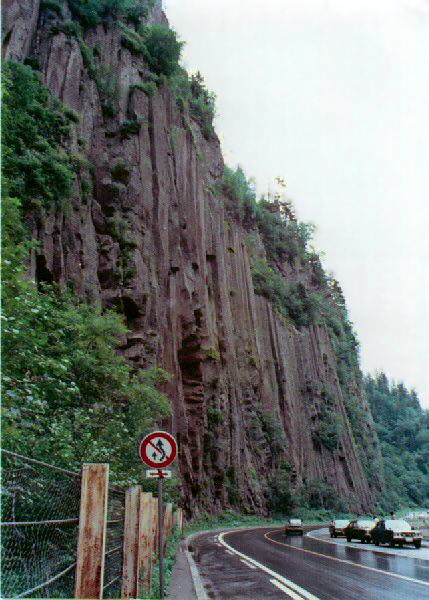
Columnar jointing on Earth

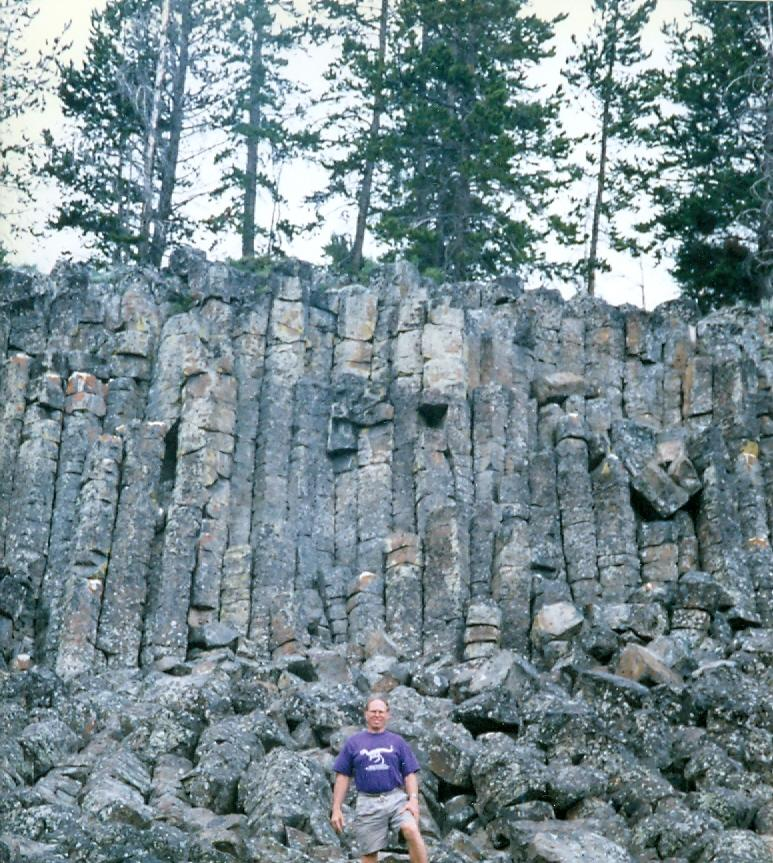
Columnar Jointing in Yellowstone National Park

== Craters ==
Impact craters generally have a rim with ejecta around them, in contrast volcanic craters usually do not have a rim or ejecta deposits. As craters get larger (greater than 10 km in diameter) they usually have a central peak. The peak is caused by a rebound of the crater floor following the impact. Sometimes craters will display layers. Since the collision that produces a crater is like a powerful explosion, rocks from deep underground are tossed onto the surface. Hence, craters can show us what lies deep under the surface.

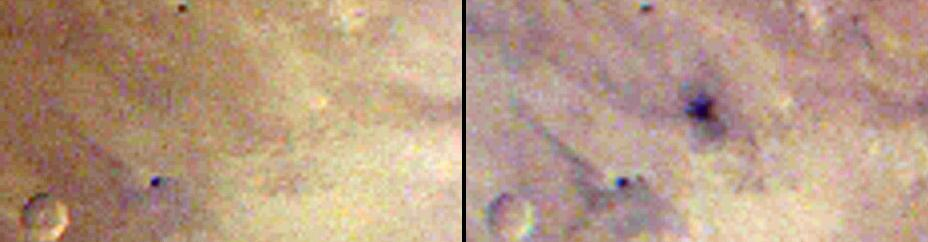
Fresh asteroid impact on Mars 3.34°N 219.38°E - before/March 27 and after/March 28, 2012 (MRO).

A pedestal crater is a crater with its ejecta sitting above the surrounding terrain and thereby forming a raised platform. They form when an impact crater ejects material which forms an erosion resistant layer, thus protecting the immediate area from erosion. As a result of this hard covering, the crater and its ejecta become elevated, as erosion removes the softer material beyond the ejecta. Some pedestals have been accurately measured to be hundreds of meters above the surrounding area. This means that hundreds of meters of material were eroded away. Pedestal craters were first observed during the Mariner missions.

Research published in the journal Icarus has found pits in Tooting Crater that are caused by hot ejecta falling on ground containing ice. The pits are formed by heat forming steam that rushes out from groups of pits simultaneously, thereby blowing away from the pit ejecta.

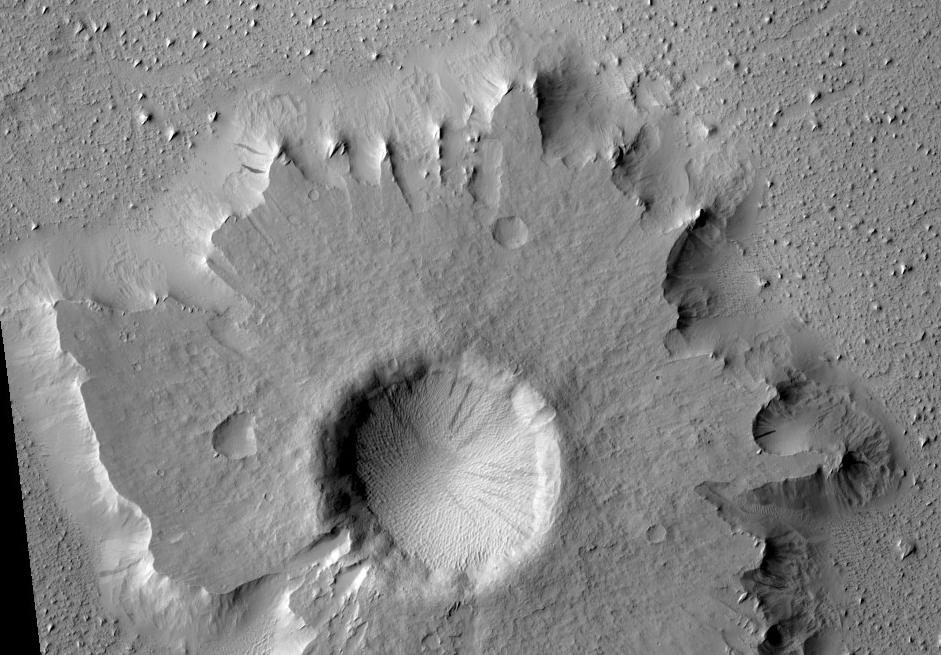
Pedestal crater in Amazonis with Dark Slope Streaks, as seen by HiRISE

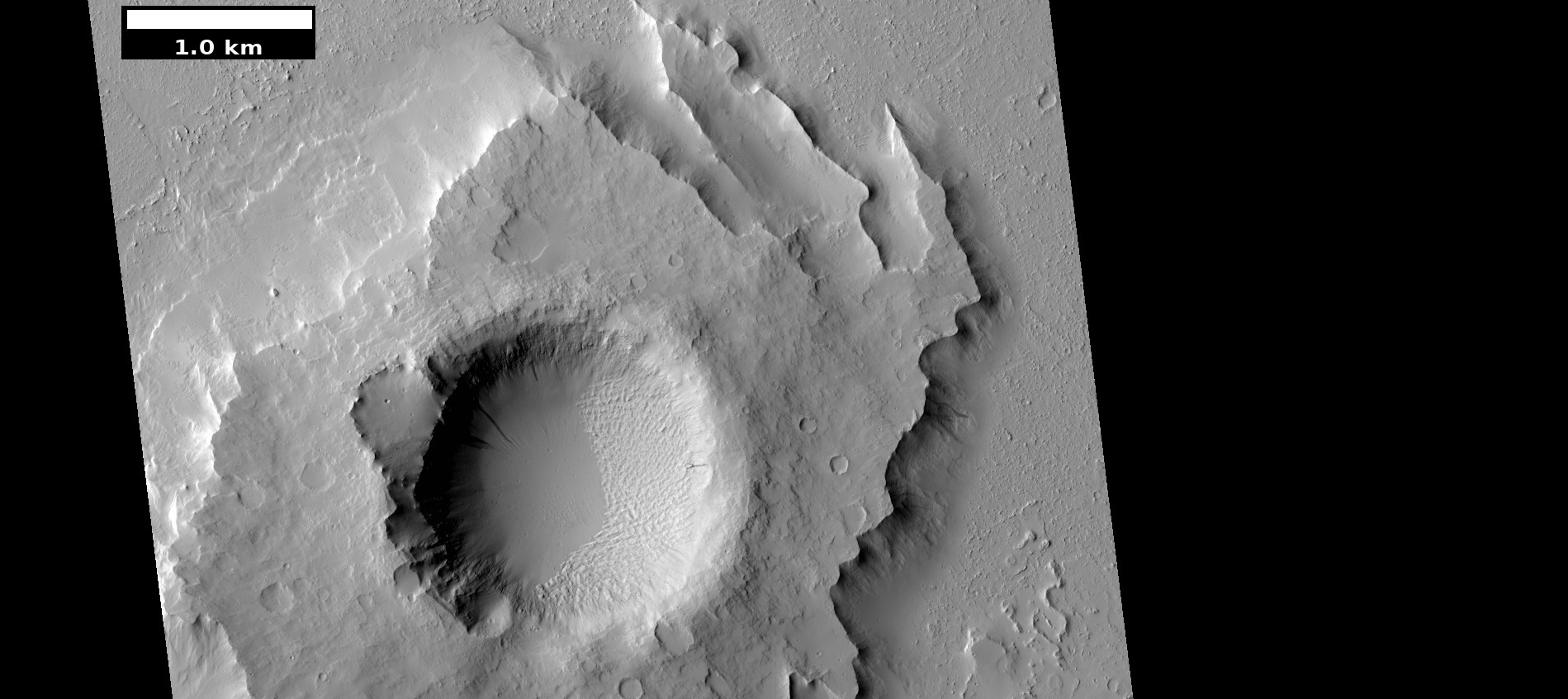
Pedestal crater with layers, as seen by HiRISE under HiWish program

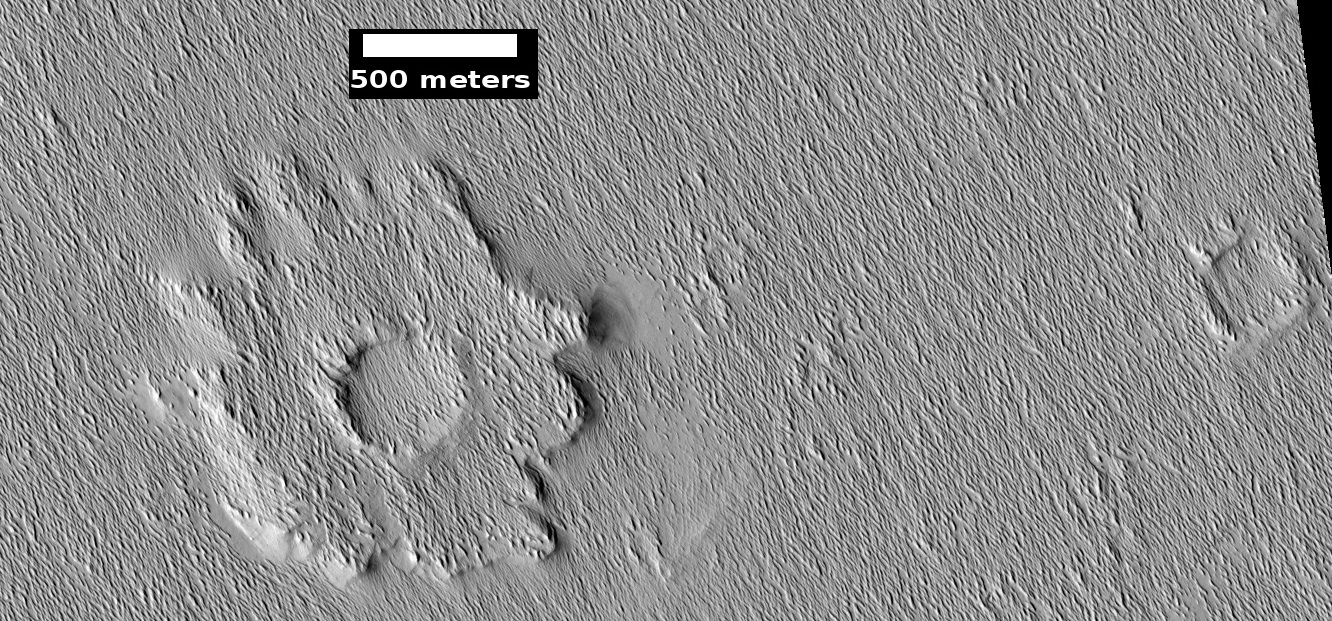
Pedestal crater, as seen by HiRISE under HiWish program

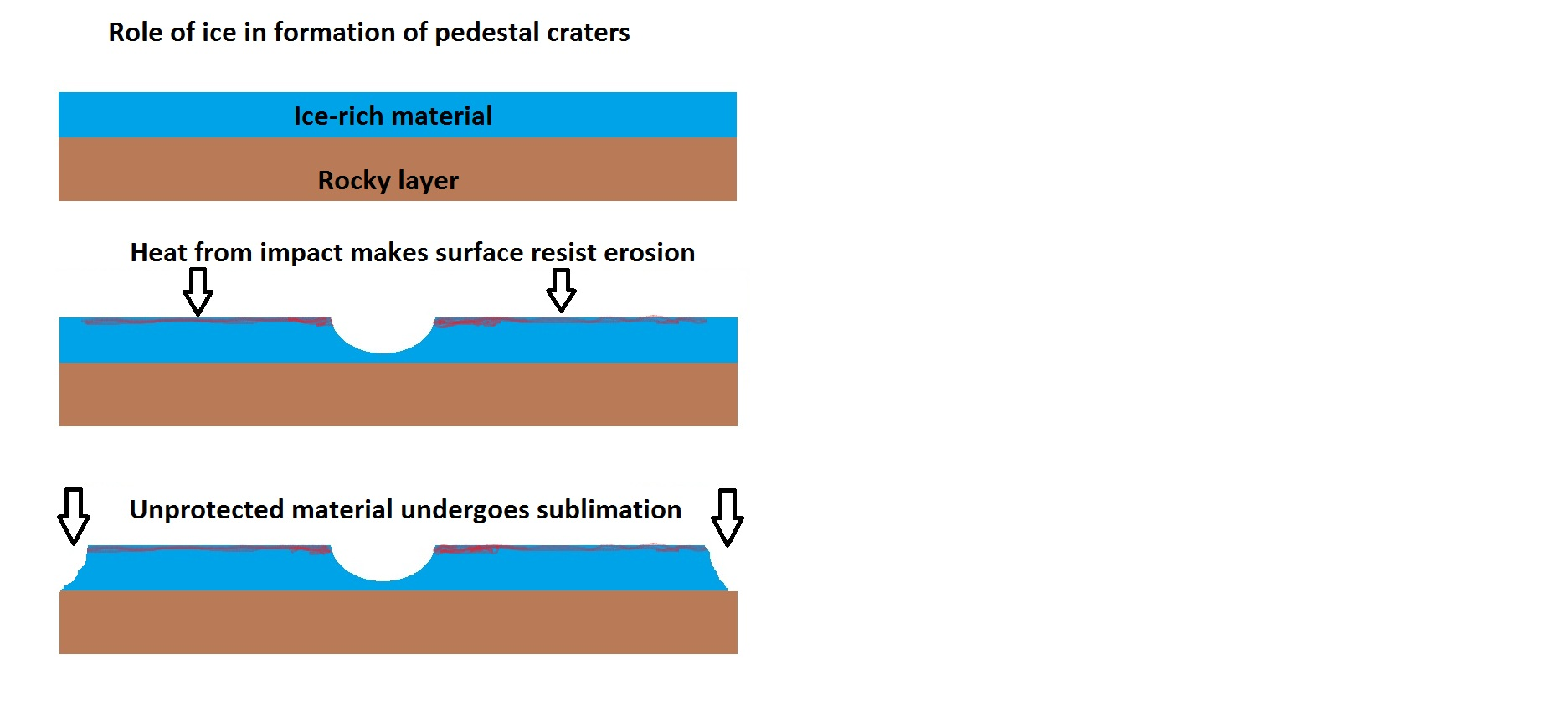
Drawing shows a later idea of how some pedestal craters form. In this way of thinking, an impacting projectile goes into an ice-rich layer—but no further. Heat and wind from the impact hardens the surface against erosion. This hardening can be accomplished by the melting of ice which produces a salt/mineral solution thereby cementing the surface.

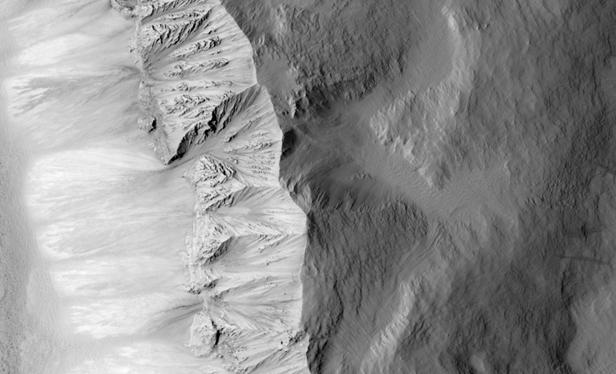
Wall of Tooting Crater, as seen by HiRISE

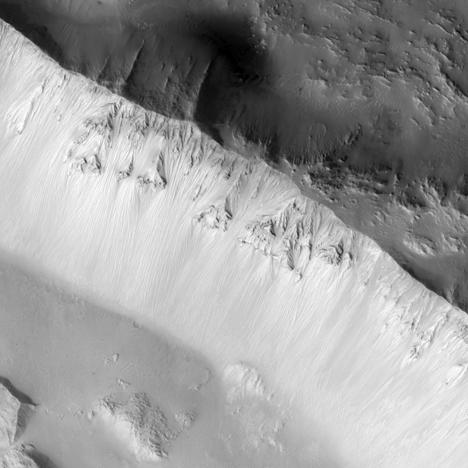
Pettit Crater rim, as seen by HiRISE

== Linear ridge networks ==
Linear ridge networks are found in various places on Mars in and around craters. Ridges often appear as mostly straight segments that intersect in a lattice-like manner. They are hundreds of meters long, tens of meters high, and several meters wide. It is thought that impacts created fractures in the surface, these fractures later acted as channels for fluids. Fluids cemented the structures. With the passage of time, surrounding material was eroded away, thereby leaving hard ridges behind. Since the ridges occur in locations with clay, these formations could serve as a marker for clay which requires water for its formation. Water here could have supported past life in these locations. Clay may also preserve fossils or other traces of past life.

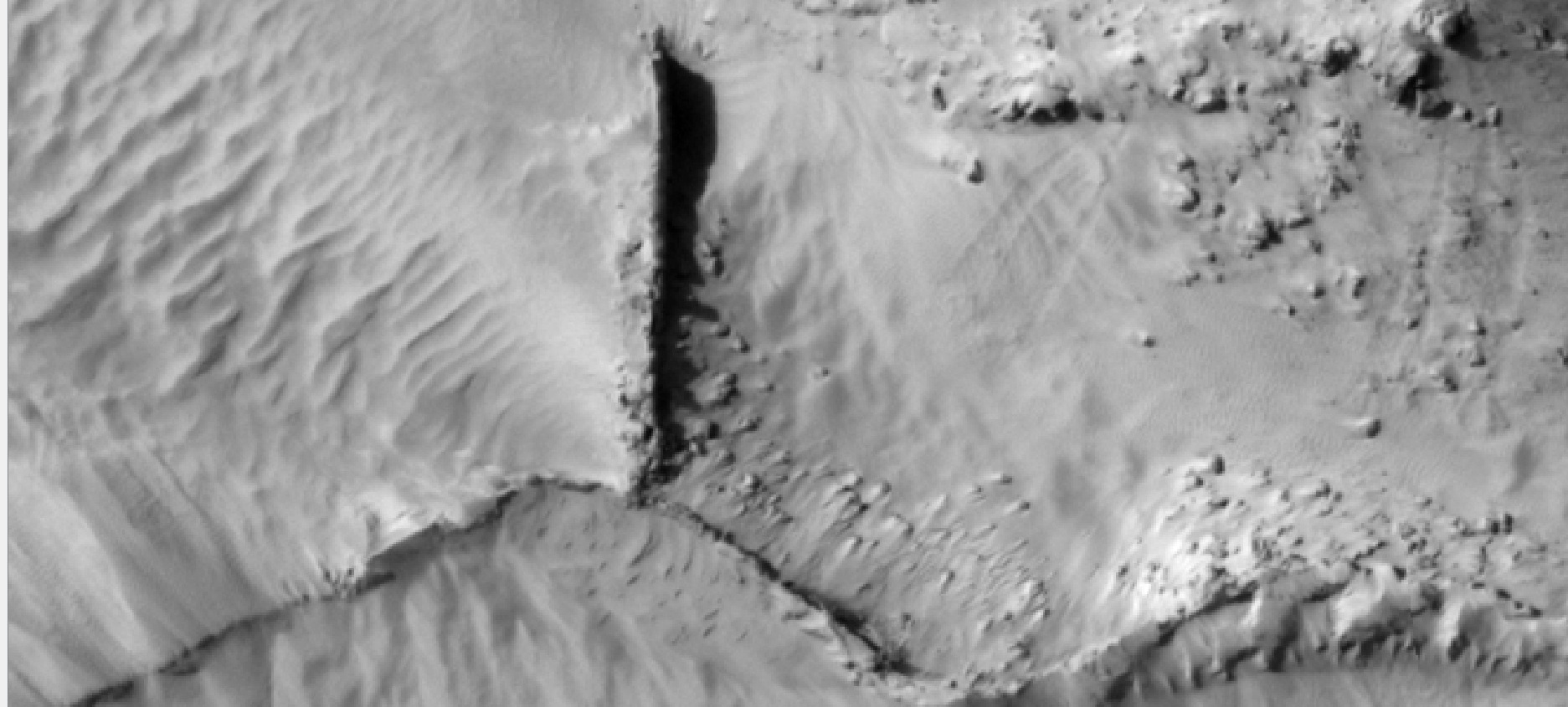
Narrow ridges, as seen by HiRISE under HiWish program. The ridges may be the result of impacts fracturing the surface.

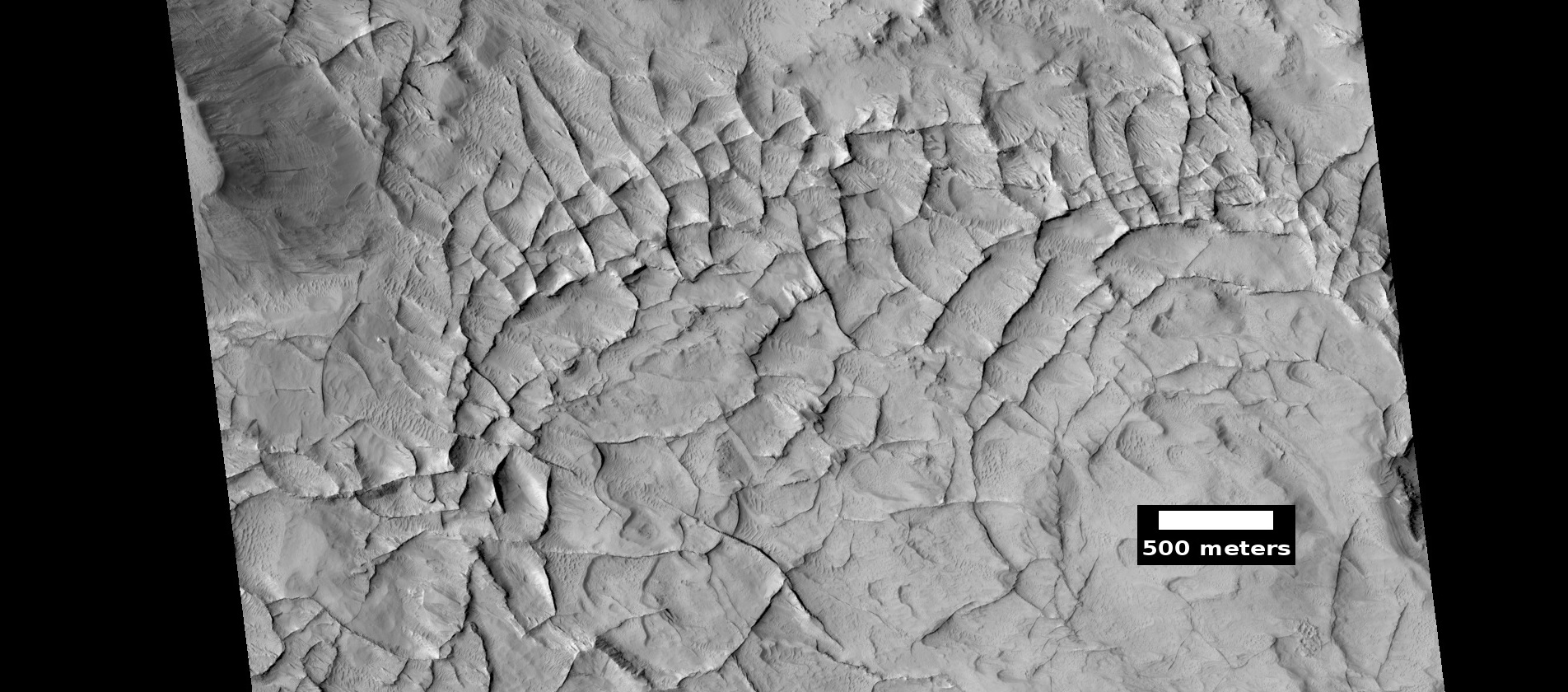
Linear ridge networks, as seen by HiRISE under HiWish program

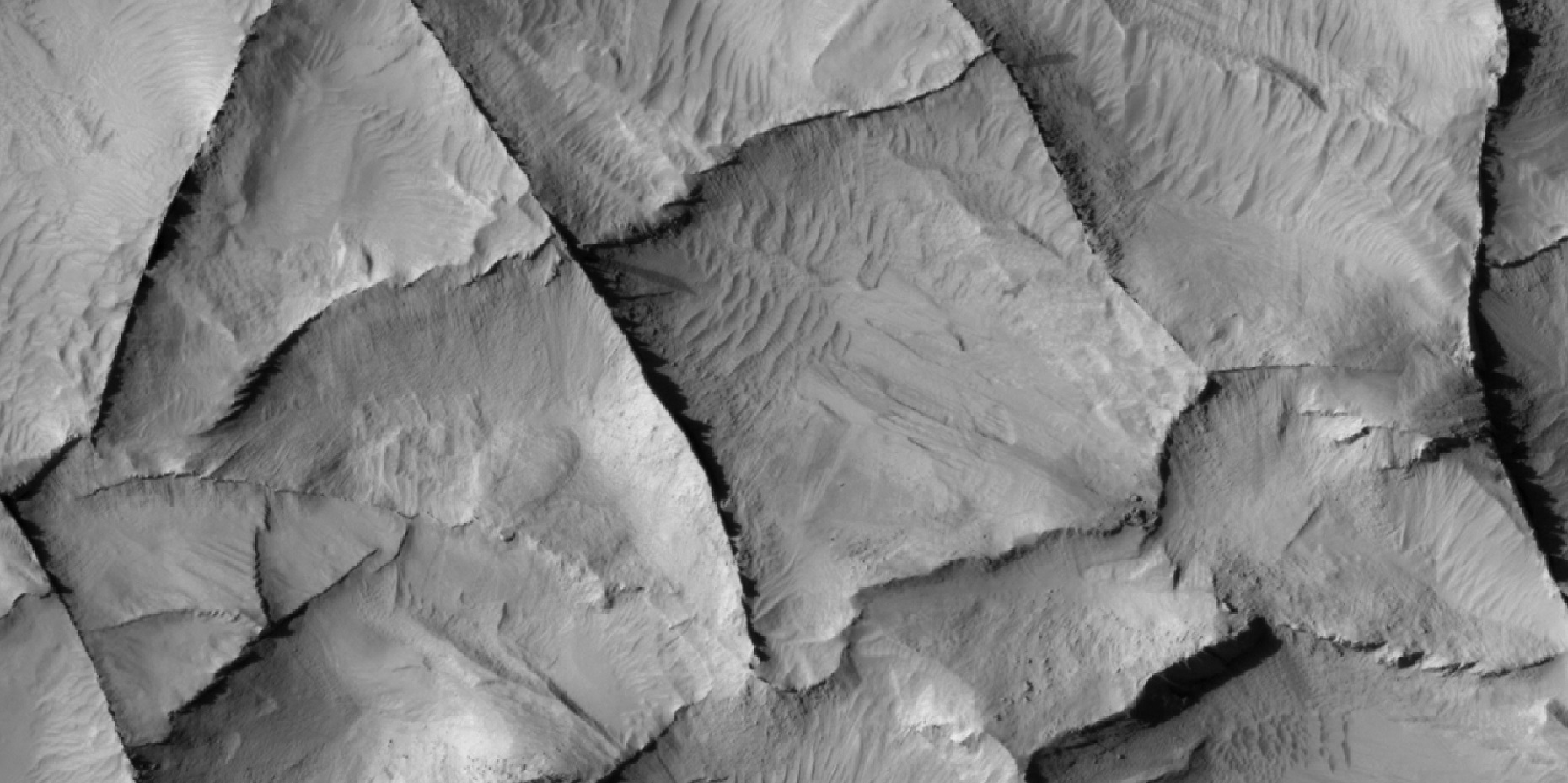
Close-up of ridge network, as seen by HiRISE under HiWish program. This is an enlargement of a previous image.
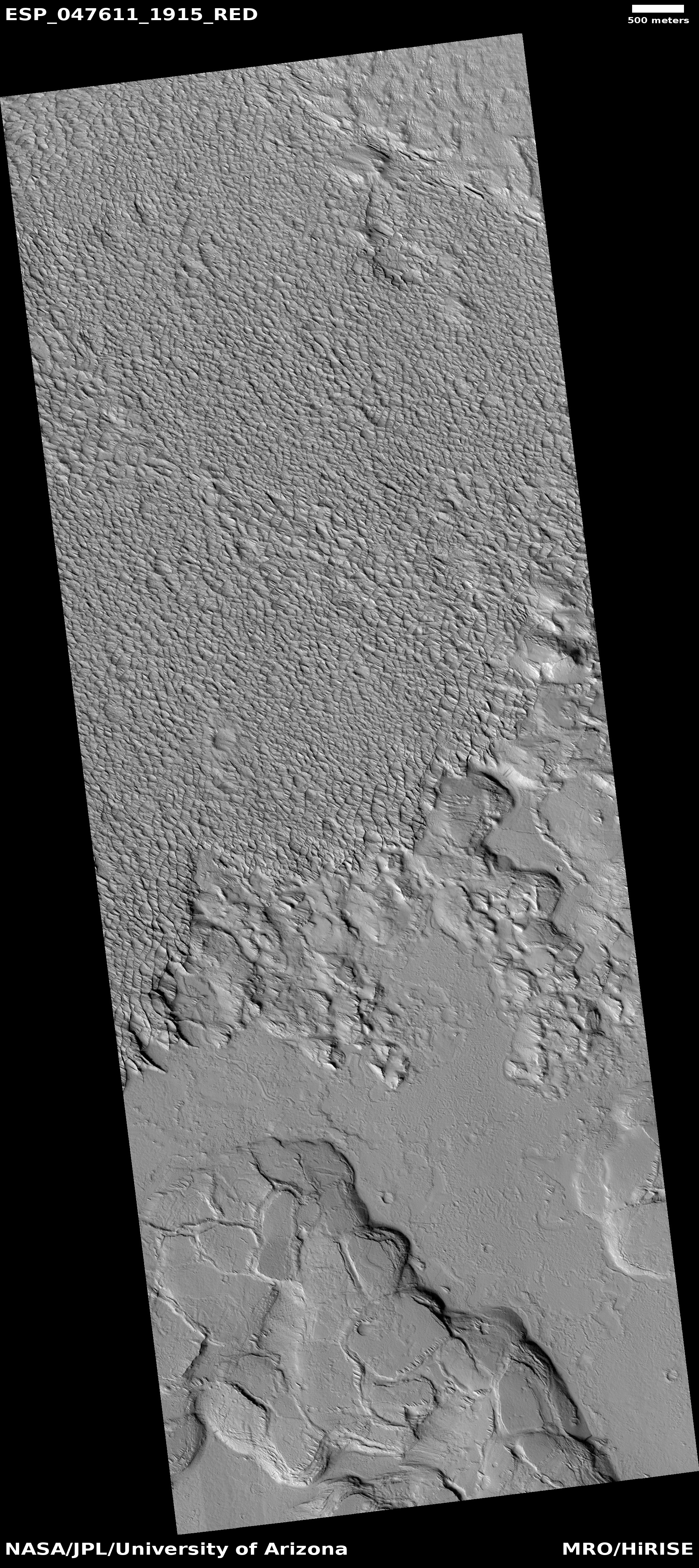
Wide view of polygon ridges, as seen by HiRISE under HiWish program

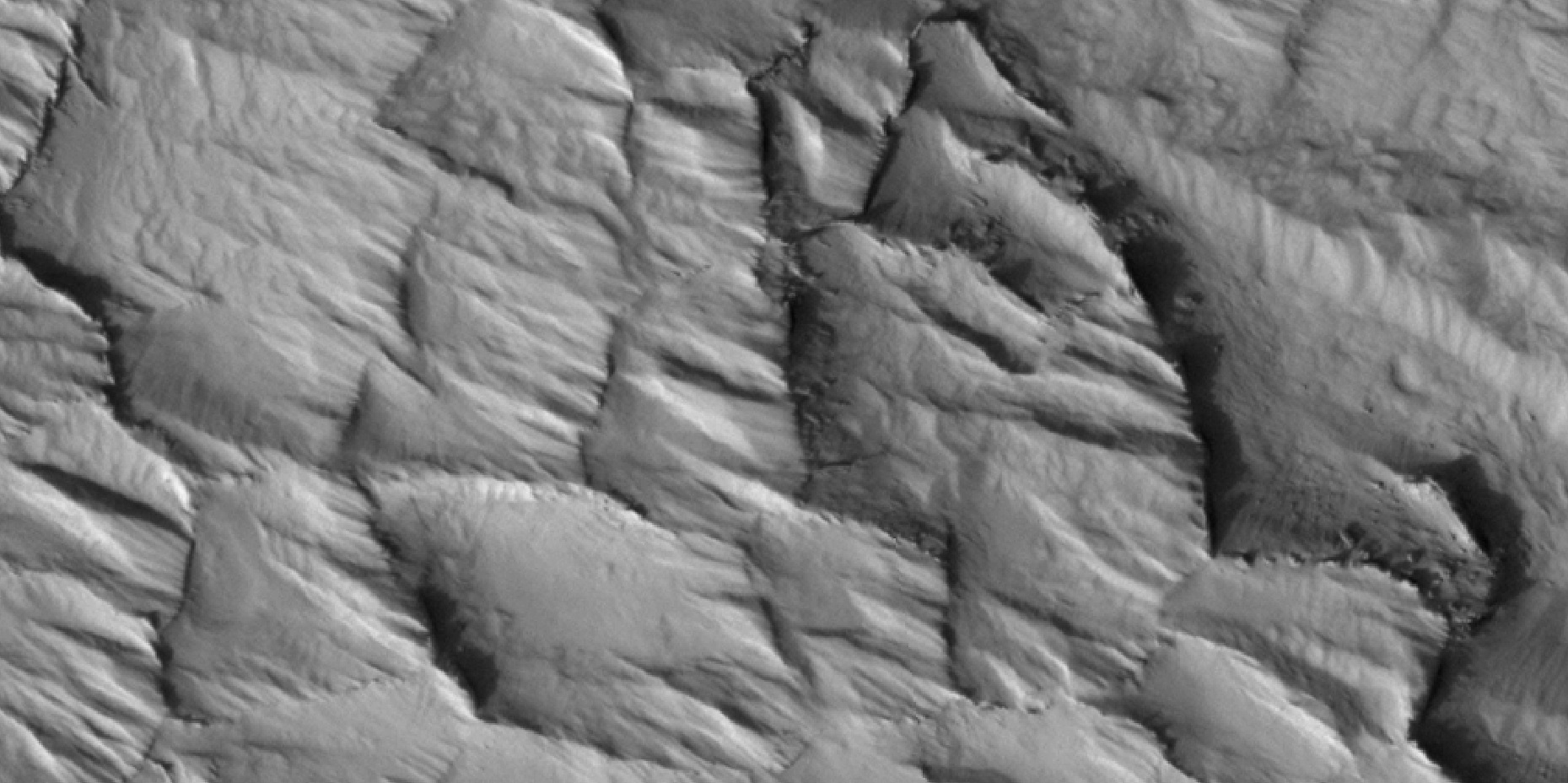
Polygonal ridges, as seen by HiRISE under HiWish program

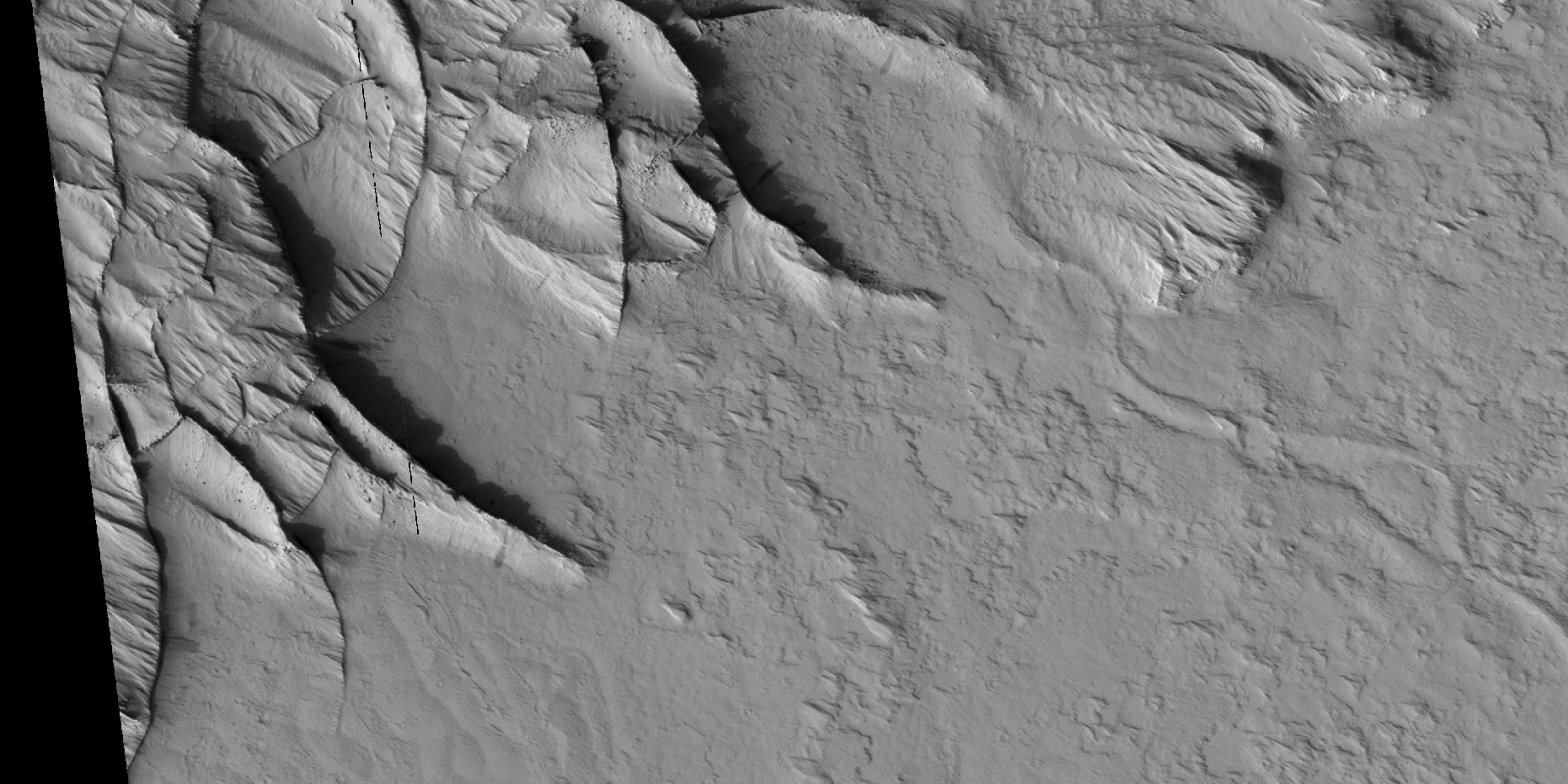
Polygonal ridges, as seen by HiRISE under HiWish program

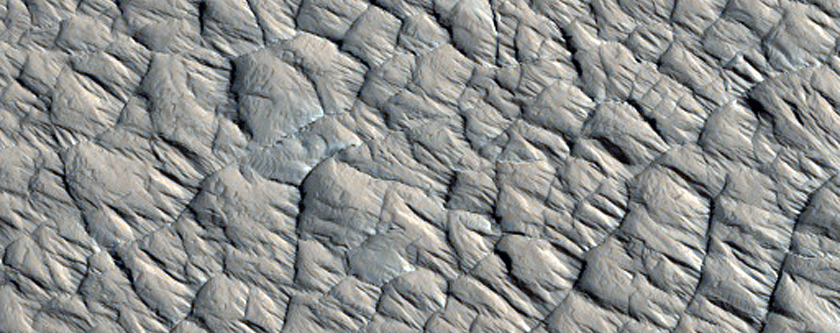
Close, color view of polygonal ridges, as seen by HiRISE under HiWish program
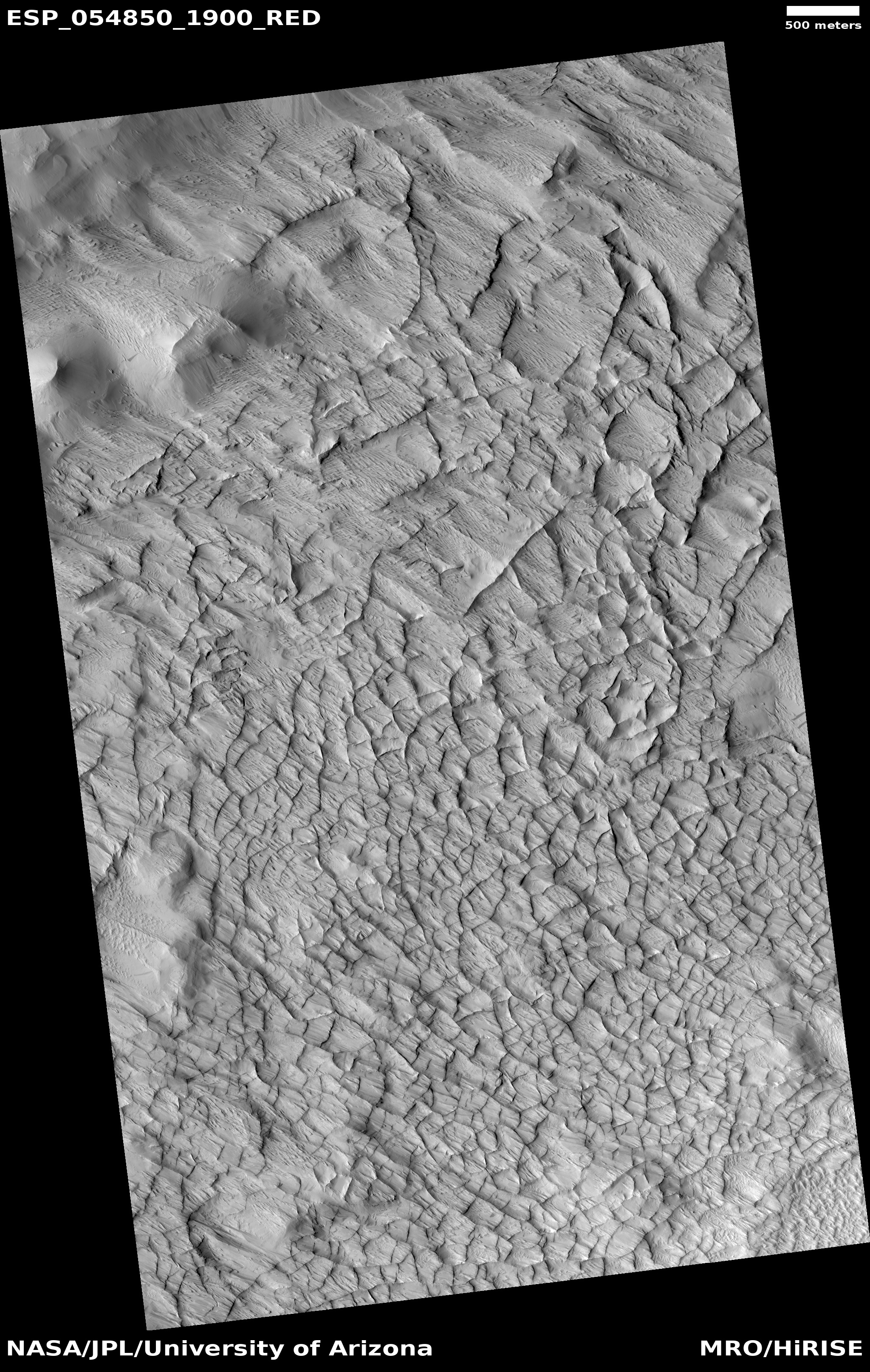
Wide view of large ridge network, as seen by HiRISE under HiWish program

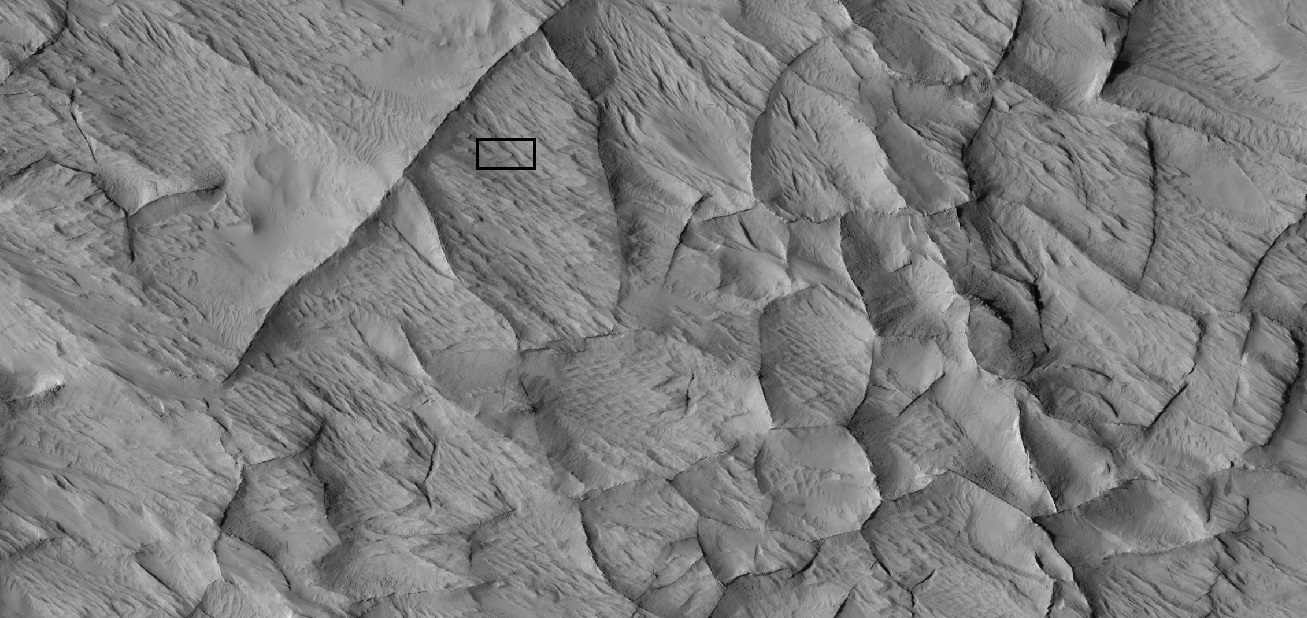
Close view of ridge network, as seen by HiRISE under HiWish program Box shows size of football field.

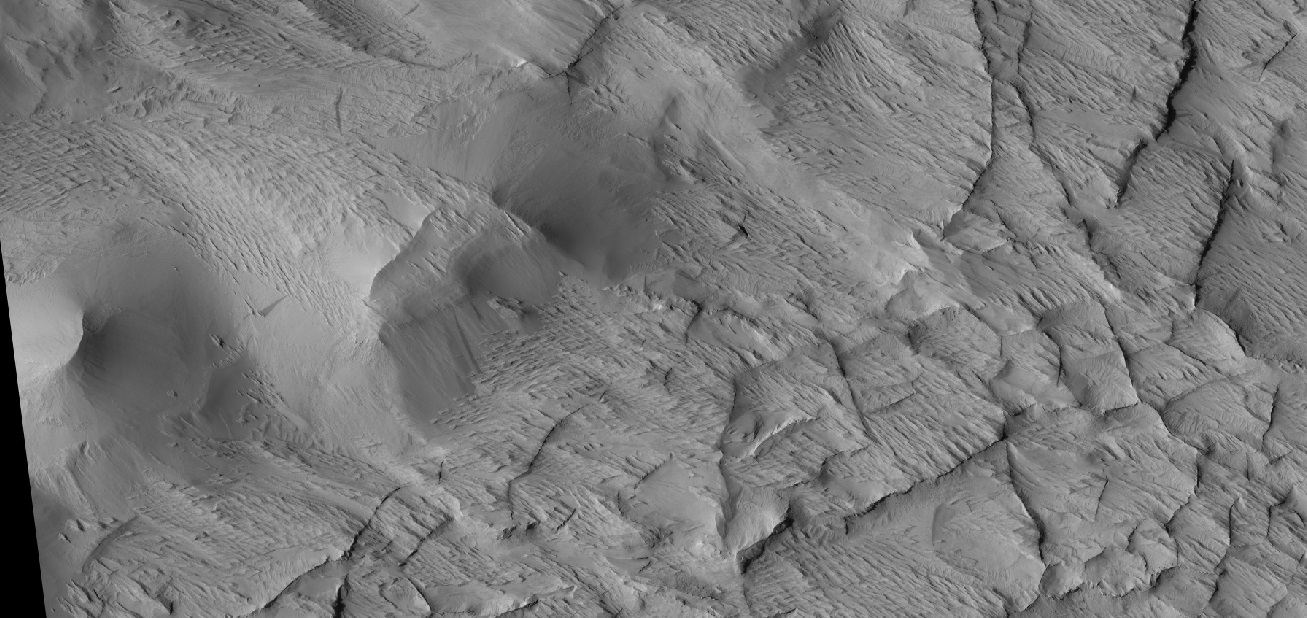
Close view of contact between ridge network and overlying layer, as seen by HiRISE under HiWish program

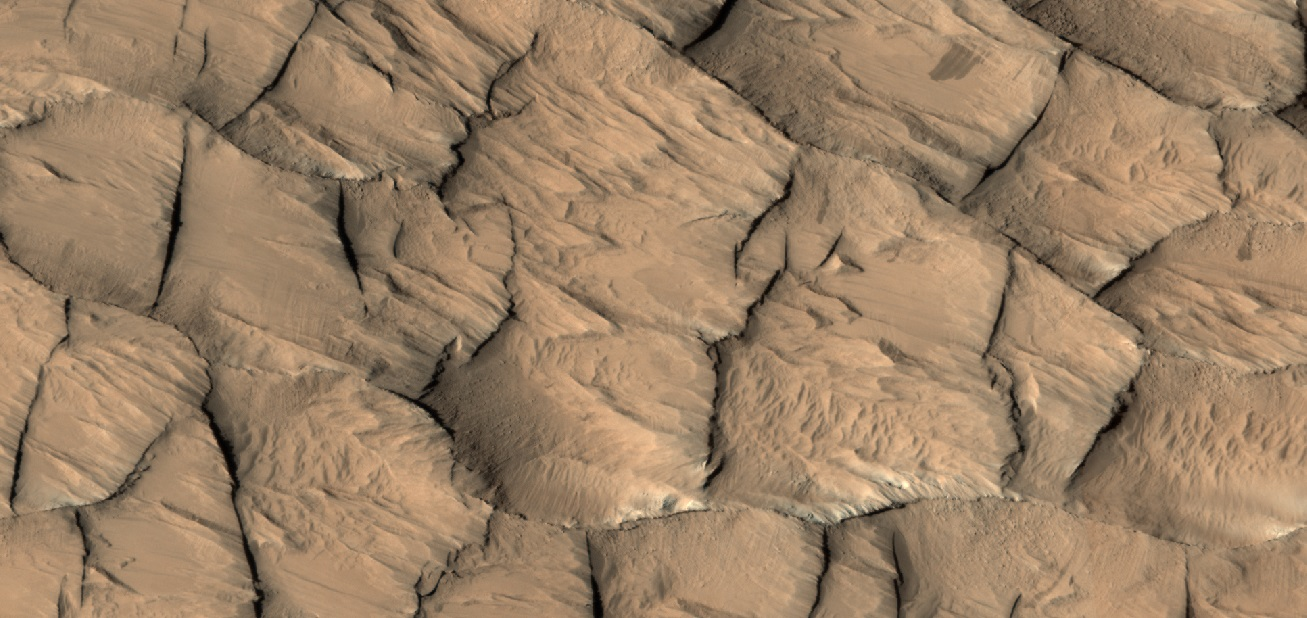
Close, color view of ridges, as seen by HiRISE under HiWish program

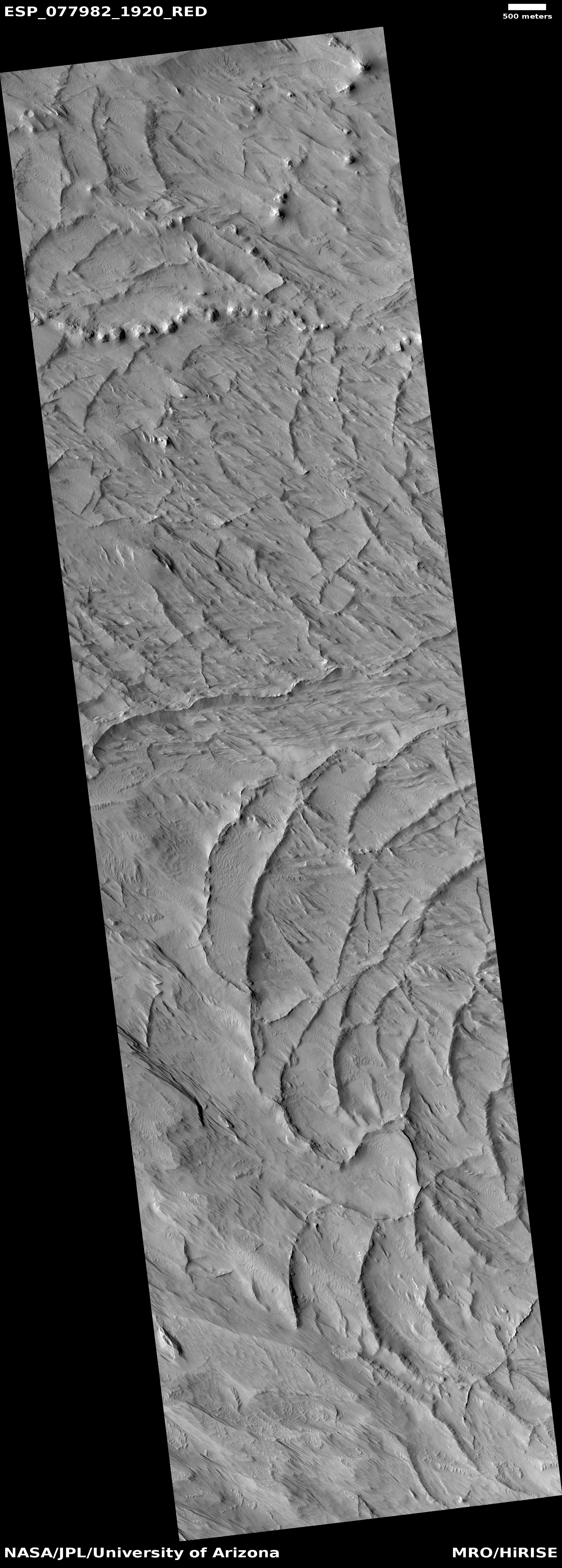
Wide view of curved ridges, as seen by HiRISE under HiWish program

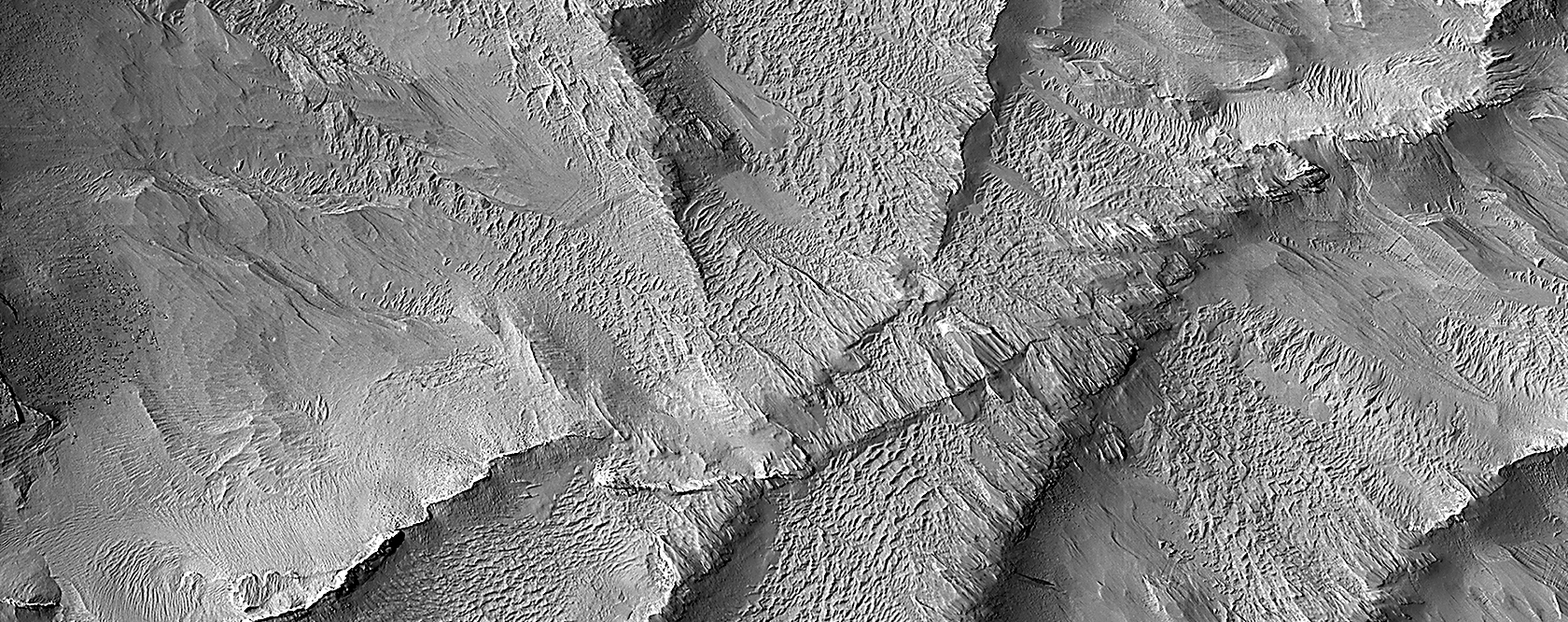
Close view of curved ridges, as seen by HiRISE under HiWish program. These formed underground and then were uncovered by erosion.

== Dark Slope Streaks ==
Dark slope streaks are narrow, avalanche-like features common on dust-covered slopes in the equatorial regions of Mars. They form in relatively steep terrain, such as along escarpments and crater walls. Although first recognized in Viking Orbiter images from the late 1970s, dark slope streaks were not studied in detail until higher-resolution images from the Mars Global Surveyor (MGS) and Mars Reconnaissance Orbiter (MRO) spacecraft became available in the late 1990s and 2000s.

The physical process that produces dark slope streaks is still uncertain. They are most likely caused by the mass movement of loose, fine-grained material on oversteepened slopes (i.e., dust avalanches). The avalanching disturbs and removes a bright surface layer of dust to expose a darker substrate.

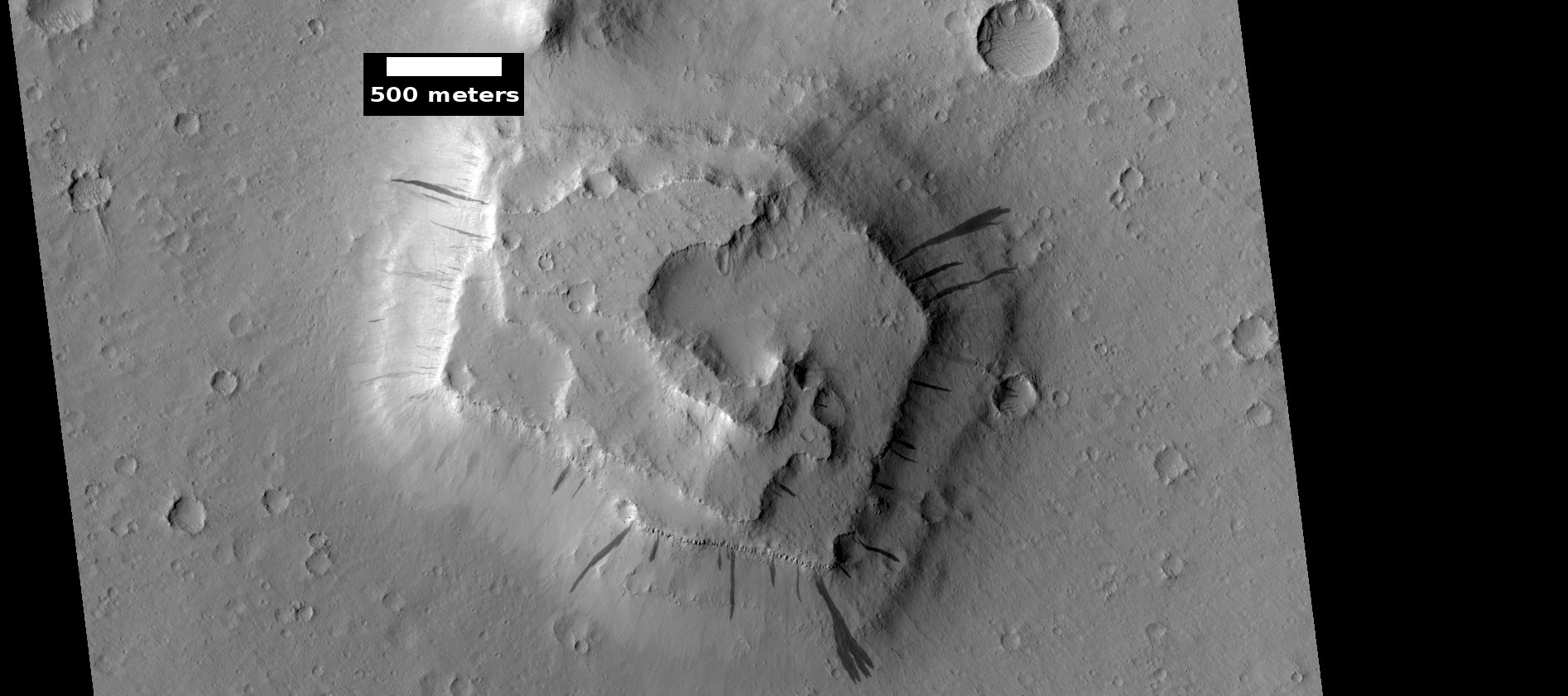
Dark slope streaks on layered mesa, as seen by HiRISE under HiWish program

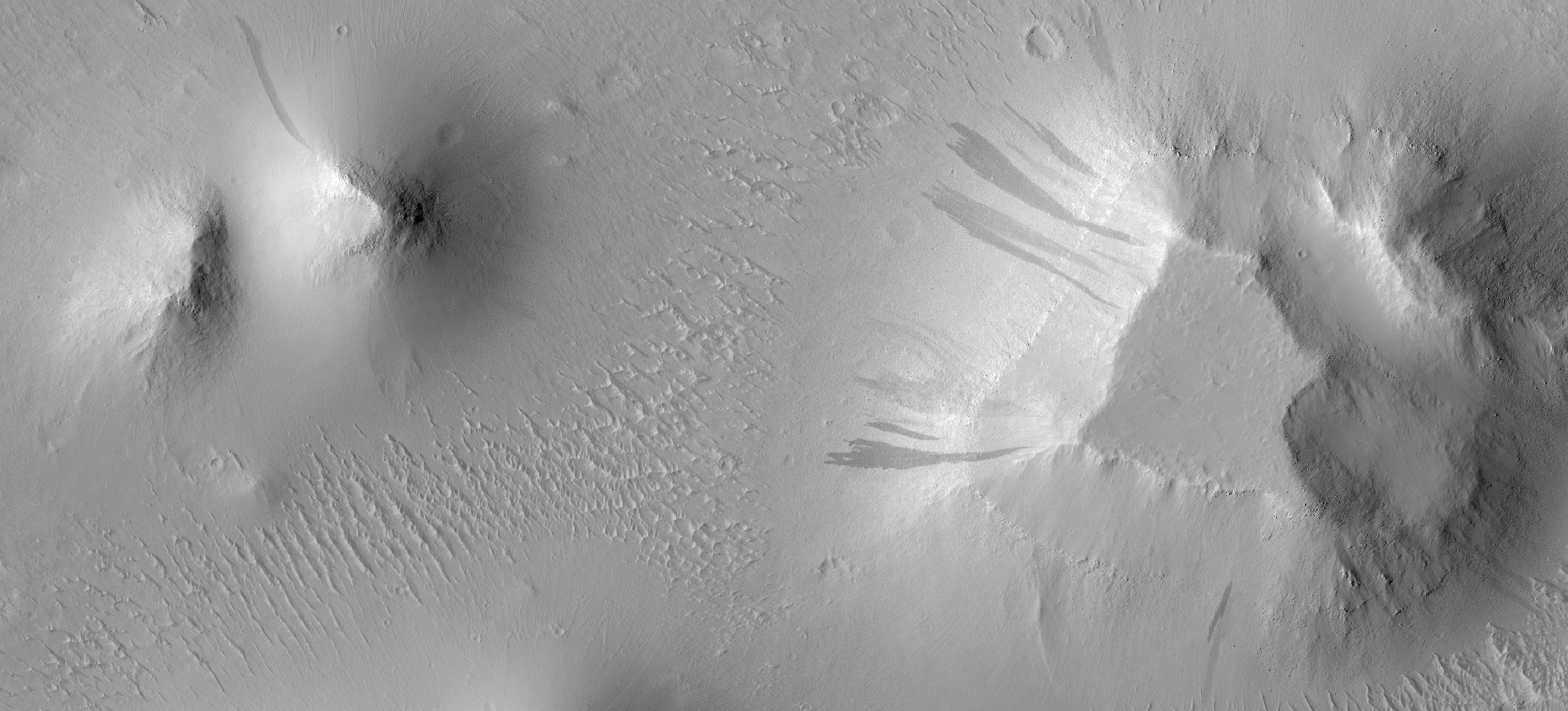
Dark slope streaks on mesa, as seen by HiRISE under HiWish program. Location is Amazonis quadrangle.

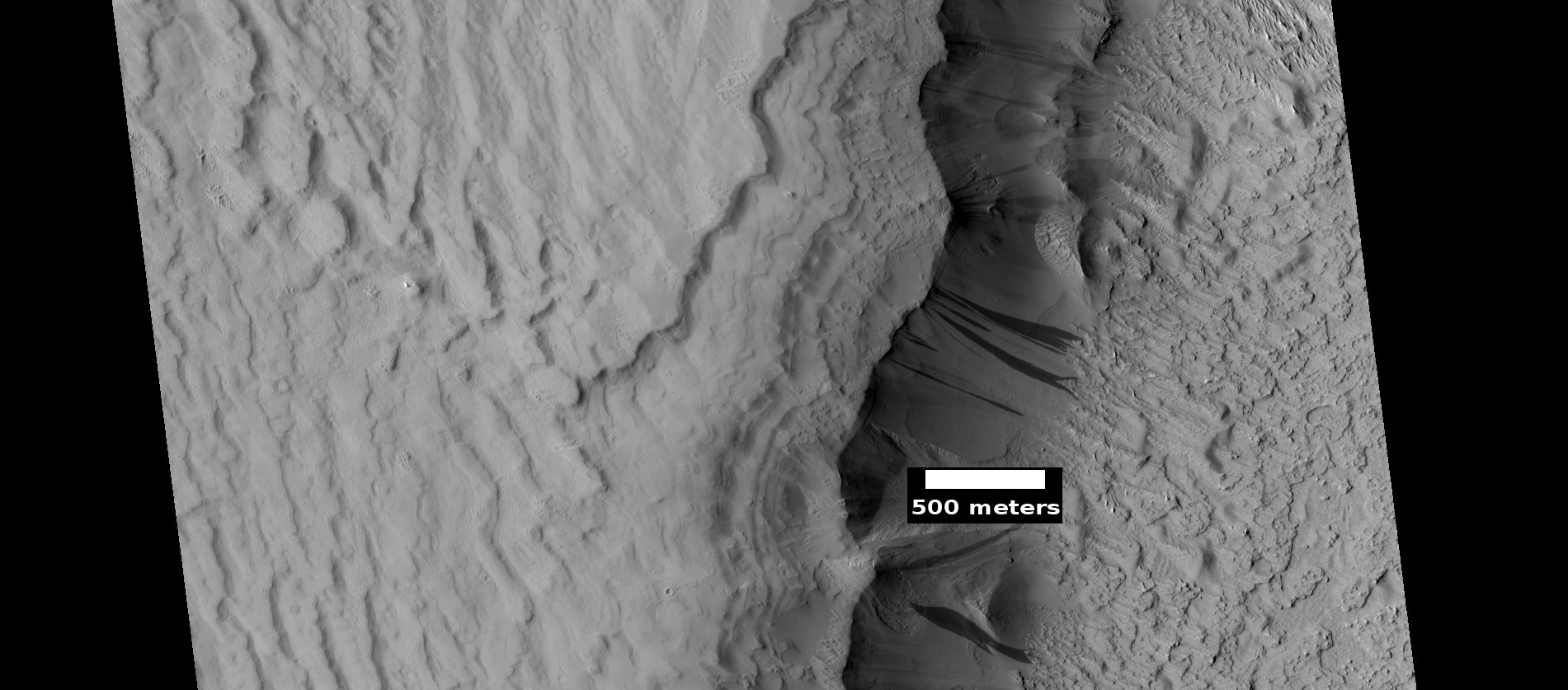
Layers in Gordii Dorsum Region, as seen by HiRISE under HiWish program. Dark lines are dark slope streaks.

Animation showing changes in streaks on slopes of ridges within the Olympus Mons Aureole. The changes happened in six years.

Research, published in January 2012 in Icarus, found that dark streaks were initiated by airblasts from meteorites traveling at supersonic speeds. The team of scientists was led by Kaylan Burleigh, an undergraduate at the University of Arizona. After counting some 65,000 dark streaks around the impact site of a group of five new craters, patterns emerged. The number of streaks was greatest closer to the impact site. So, the impact somehow probably caused the streaks. Also, the distribution of the streaks formed a pattern with two wings extending from the impact site. The curved wings resembled scimitars, curved knives. This pattern suggests that an interaction of airblasts from the group of meteorites shook dust loose enough to start dust avalanches that formed the many dark streaks. At first it was thought that the shaking of the ground from the impact caused the dust avalanches, but if that was the case the dark streaks would have been arranged symmetrically around the impacts, rather than being concentrated into curved shapes.

The crater cluster lies near the equator 510 miles) south of Olympus Mons, on a type of terrain called the Medusae Fossae formation. The formation is coated with dust and contains wind-carved ridges called yardangs. These yardangs have steep slopes thickly covered with dust, so when the sonic boom of the airblast arrived from the impacts dust started to move down the slope. Using photos from Mars Global Surveyor and HiRISE camera on NASA's Mars Reconnaissance Orbiter, scientists have found about 20 new impacts each year on Mars. Because the spacecraft have been imaging Mars almost continuously for a span of 14 years, newer images with suspected recent craters can be compared to older images to determine when the craters were formed. Since the craters were spotted in a HiRISE image from February 2006, but were not present in a Mars Global Surveyor image taken in May 2004, the impact occurred in that time frame.

The largest crater in the cluster is about 22 meters (72 feet) in diameter with close to the area of a basketball court. As the meteorite traveled through the Martian atmosphere it probably broke up; hence a tight group of impact craters resulted. Dark slope streaks have been seen for some time, and many ideas have been advanced to explain them. This research may have finally solved this mystery.

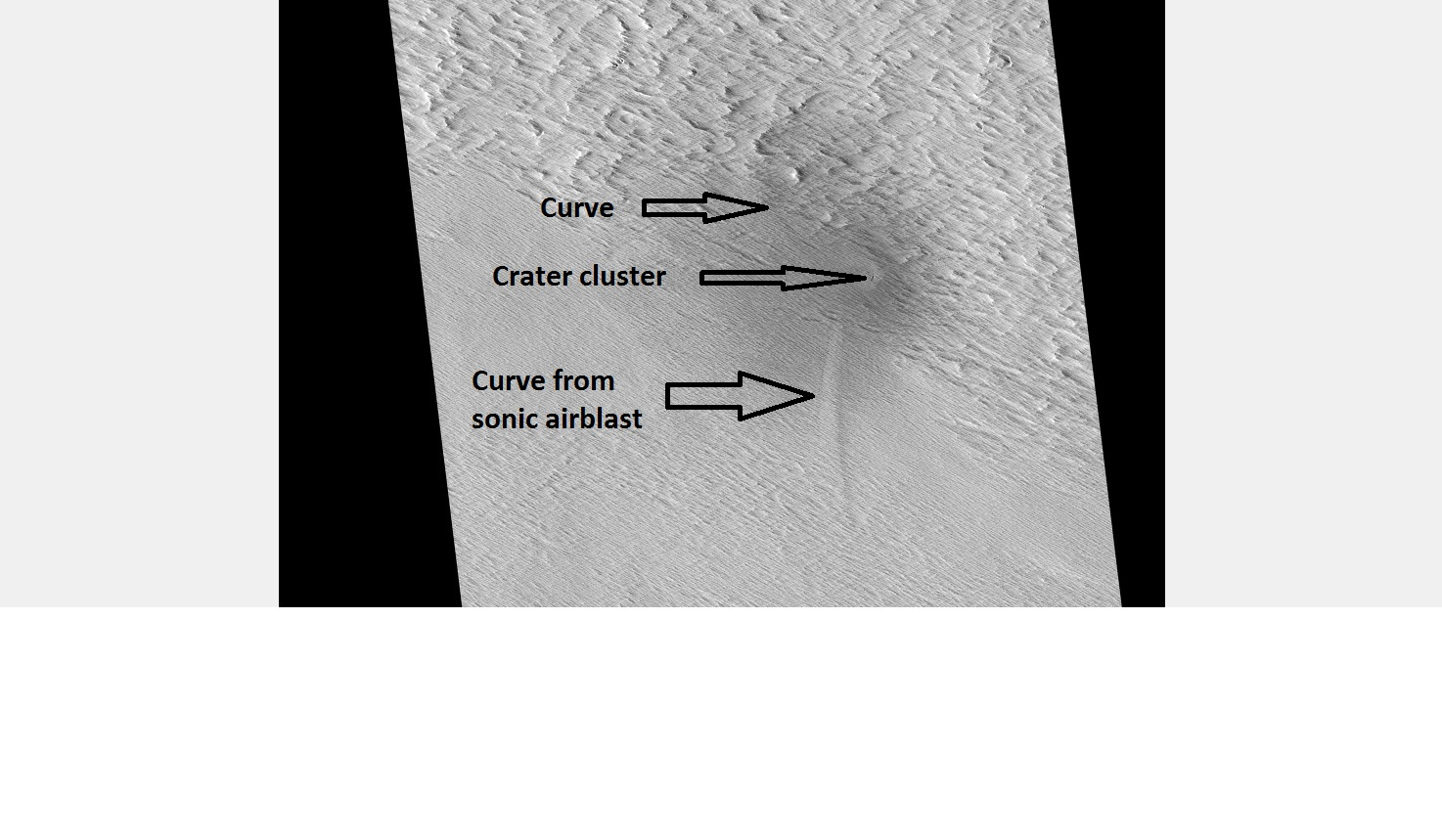
Image indicates crater cluster and curved lines formed by airblast from meteorites. Meteorites caused airblast which caused dust avalanches on steep slopes. Image is from HiRISE.

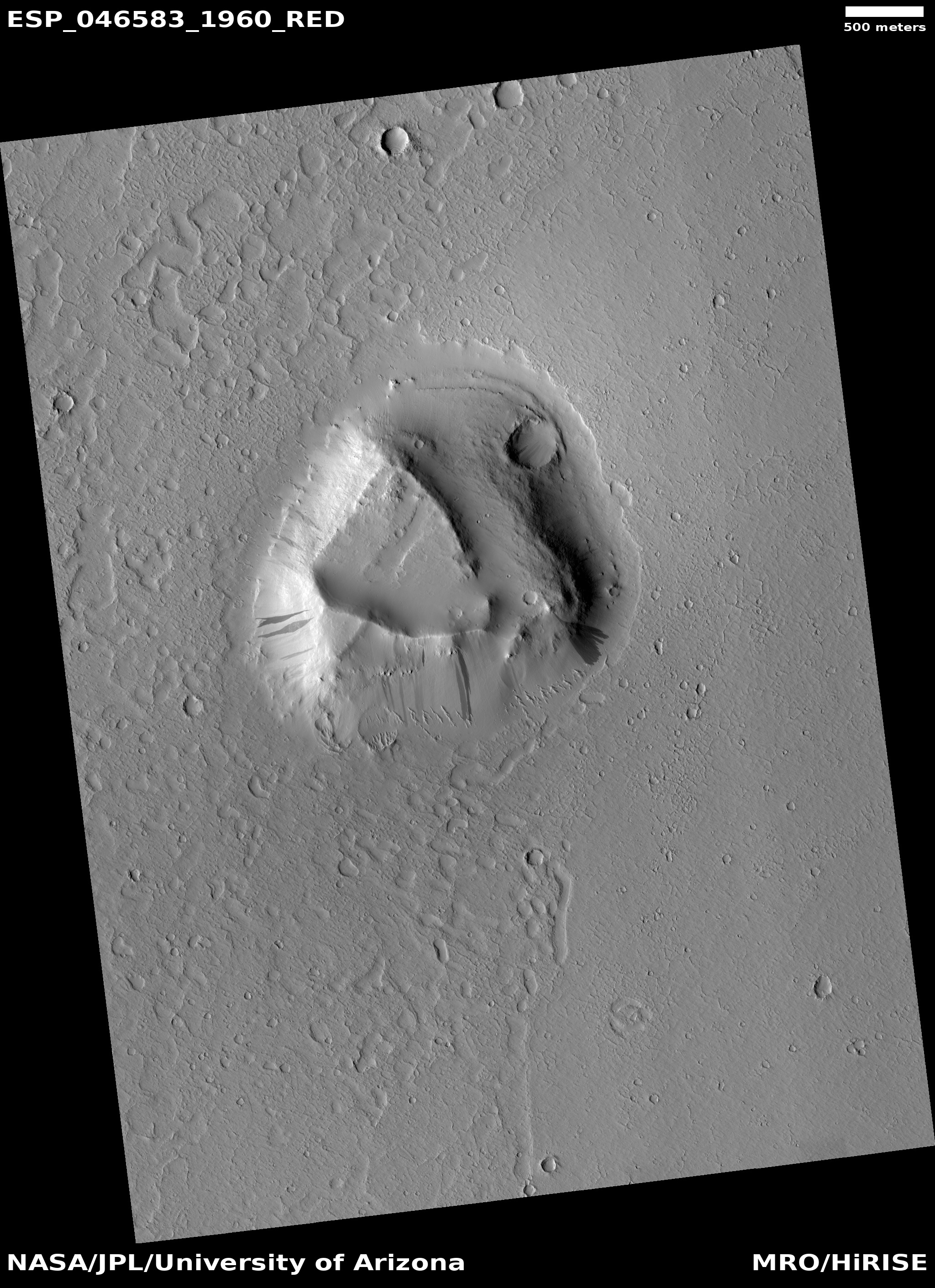
Mesa with dark slope streaks, as seen by HiRISE under HiWish program

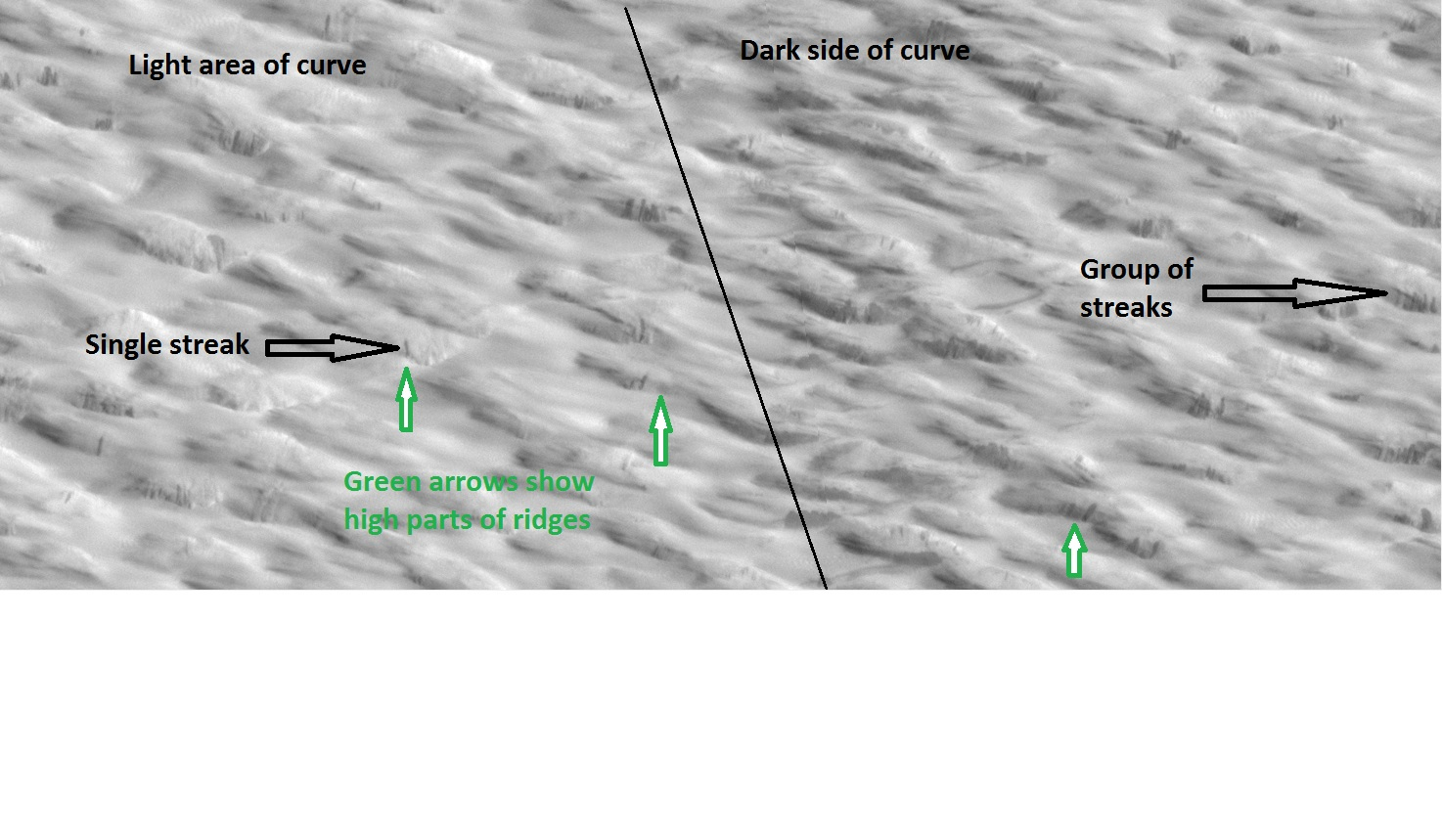
Close up of previous image along light/dark boundary. Dark line in middle of image shows border between light and dark area of curved lines. Green arrows show high areas of ridges. Loose dust moved down steep slopes when it felt the airblast from meteorite strikes. Image is from HiRISE.

== Streamlined shapes ==
When a fluid moves by a feature like a mound, it will become streamlined. Often flowing water makes the shape and later lava flows spread over the region. In the pictures below this has occurred.

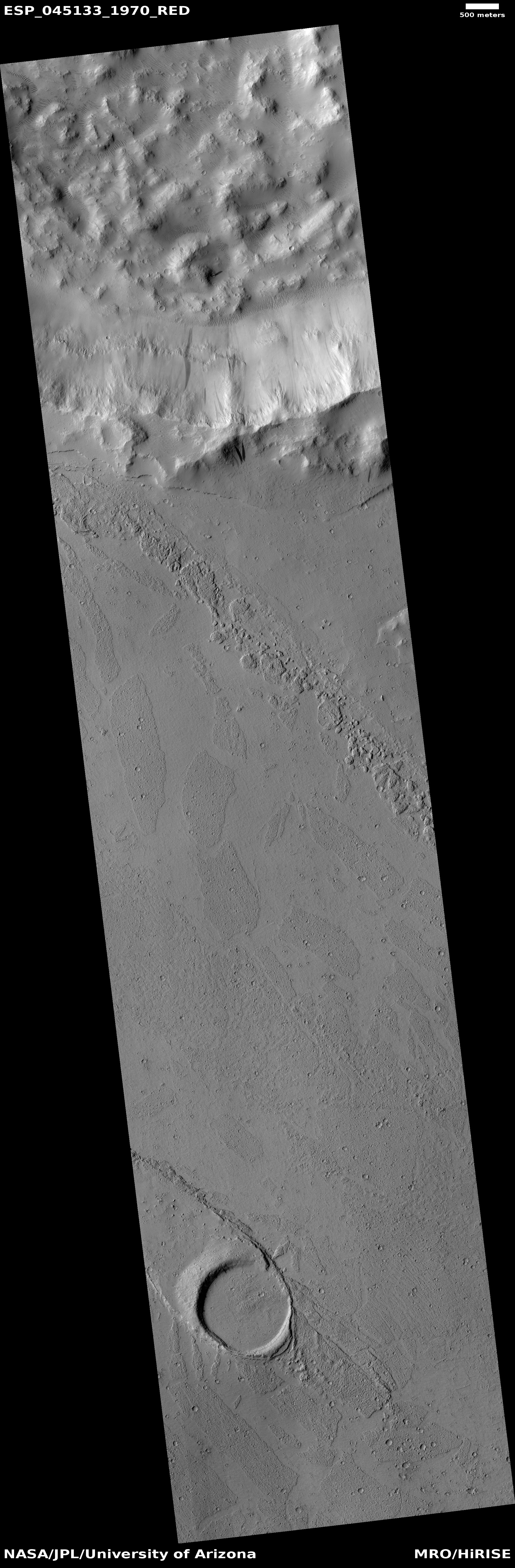
Wide view of streamlined shape and rafts of lava, as seen by HiRISE under HiWish program

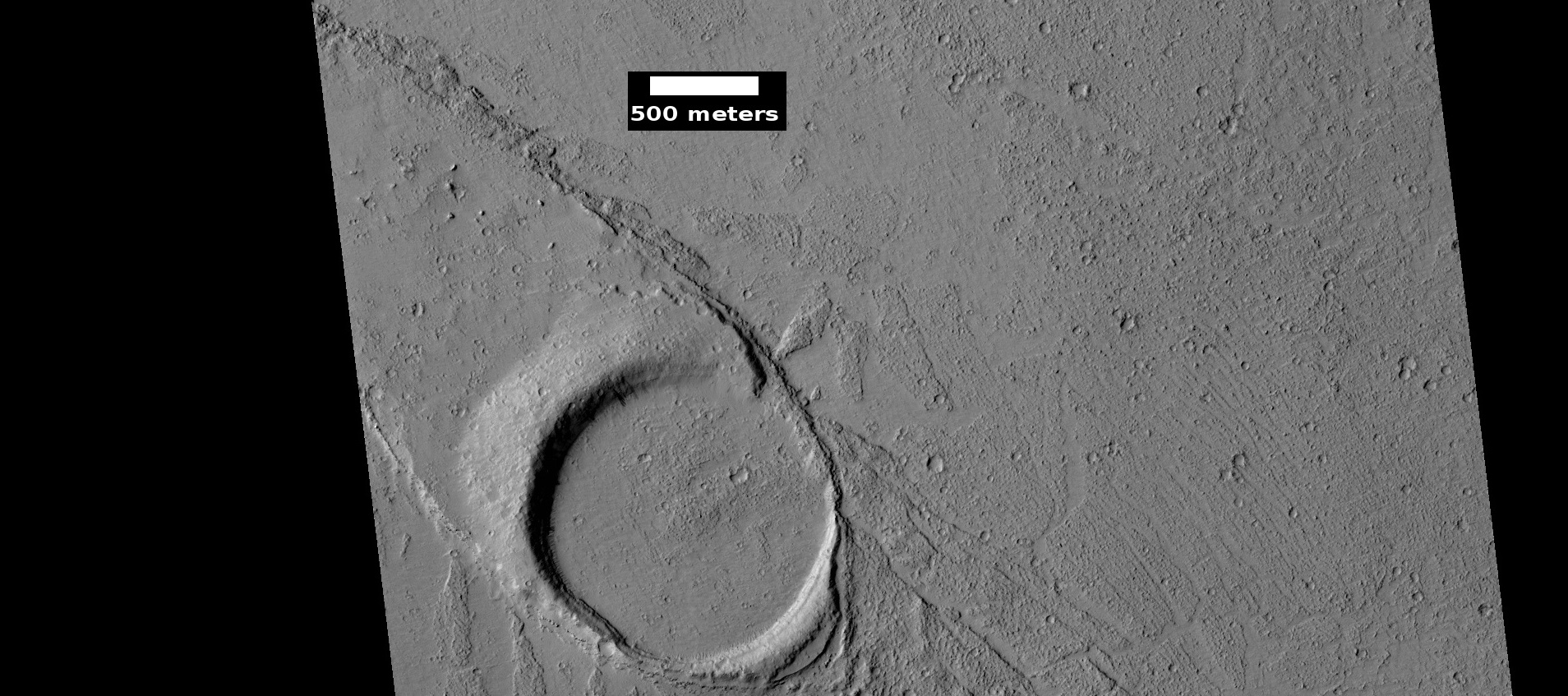
Closer view of previous image, showing layers, as seen by HiRISE under HiWish program

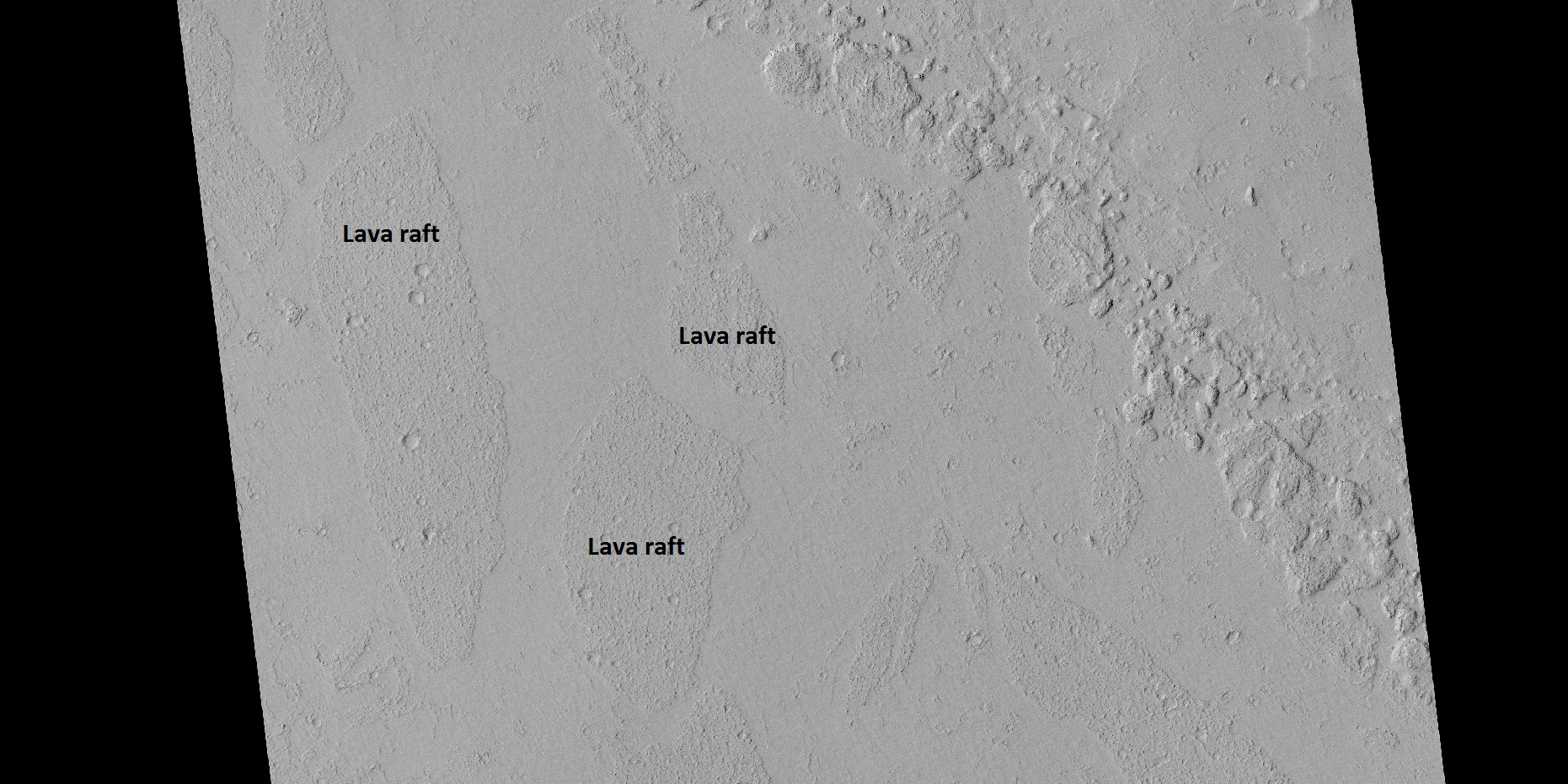
Close view of lava rafts from previous images, as seen by HiRISE under HiWish program

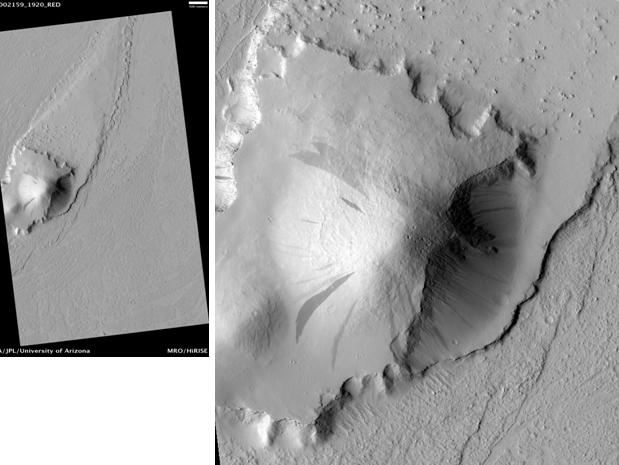
Streamlined Island in Marte Vallis, as seen by HiRISE. Click on image for good view of dark slope streaks. Island is just to the west of Pettit Crater. Scale bar is 500 meters long.

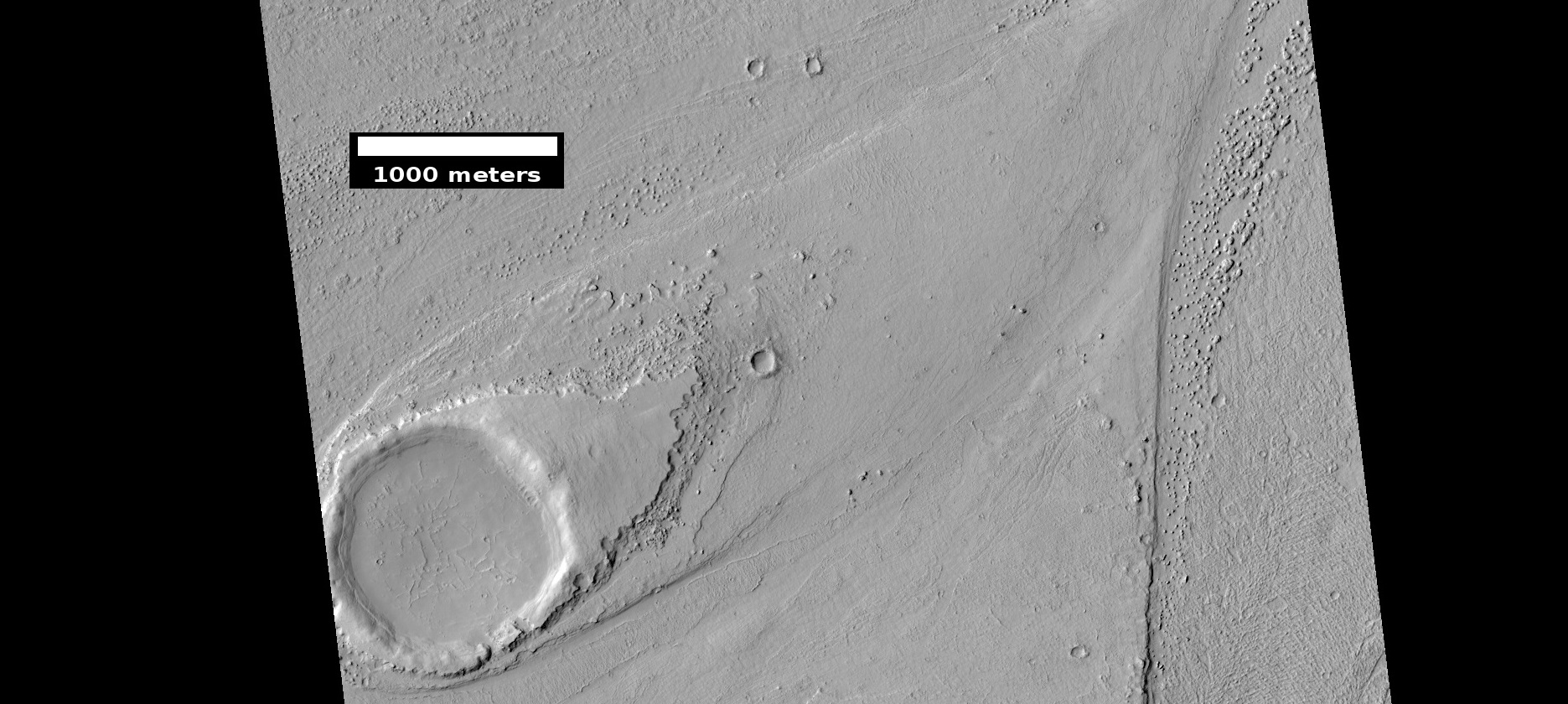
Streamlined shape showing layers, as seen by HiRISE under HiWish program

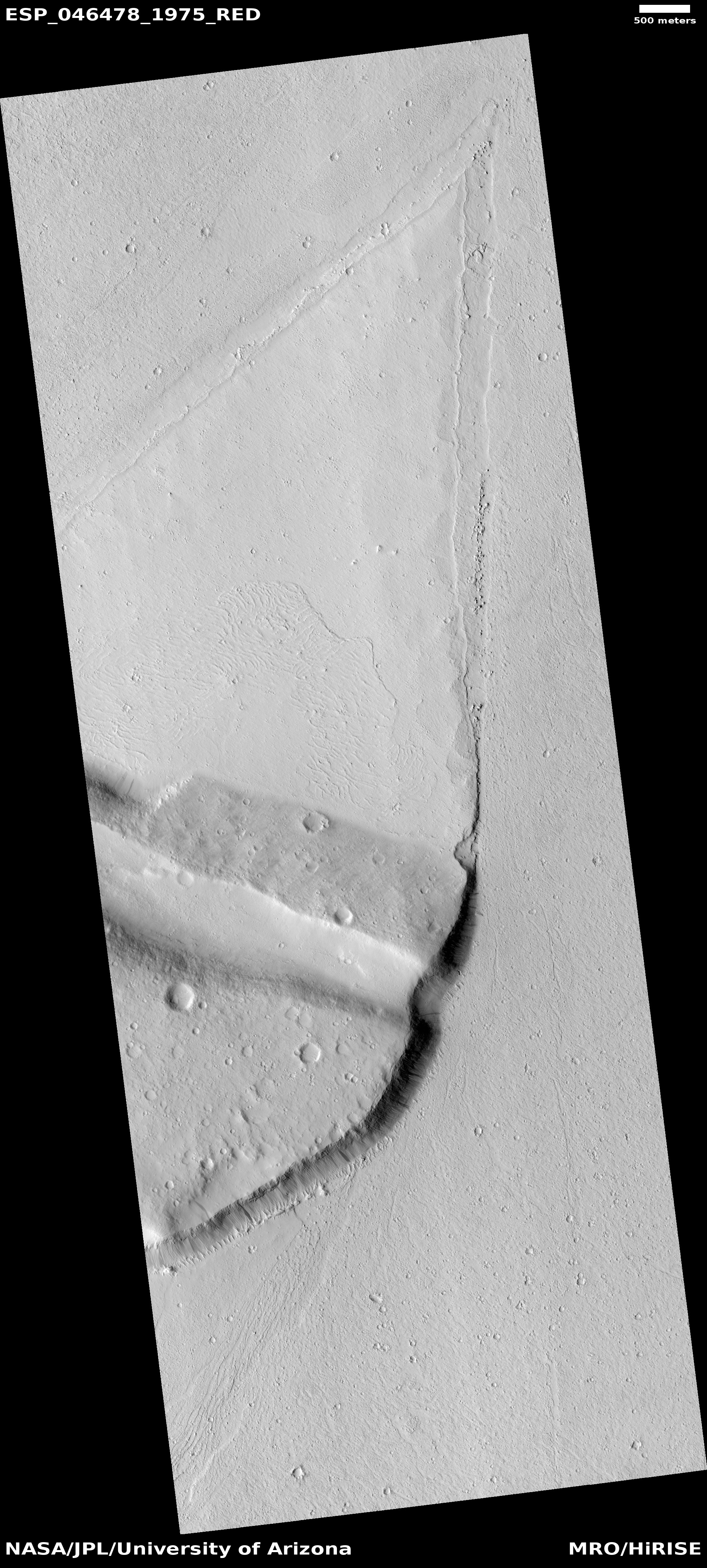
Streamlined feature, as seen by HiRISE under HiWish program

== Layers ==
,

Many places on Mars show rocks arranged in layers. Rock can form layers in a variety of ways. Volcanoes, wind, or water can produce layers. A detailed discussion of layering with many Martian examples can be found in Sedimentary Geology of Mars. Sometimes the layers are of different colors. Light-toned rocks on Mars have been associated with hydrated minerals like sulfates. The Mars rover Opportunity examined such layers close-up with several instruments. Some layers are probably made up of fine particles because they seem to break up into find dust. Other layers break up into large boulders so they are probably much harder. Basalt, a volcanic rock, is thought to in the layers that form boulders. Basalt has been identified on Mars in many places. Instruments on orbiting spacecraft have detected clay (also called phyllosilicate) in some layers.

A detailed discussion of layering with many Martian examples can be found in Sedimentary Geology of Mars.

Layers can be hardened by the action of groundwater. Martian ground water probably moved hundreds of kilometers, and in the process it dissolved many minerals from the rock it passed through. When ground water surfaces in low areas containing sediments, water evaporates in the thin atmosphere and leaves behind minerals as deposits and/or cementing agents. Consequently, layers of dust could not later easily erode away since they were cemented together.

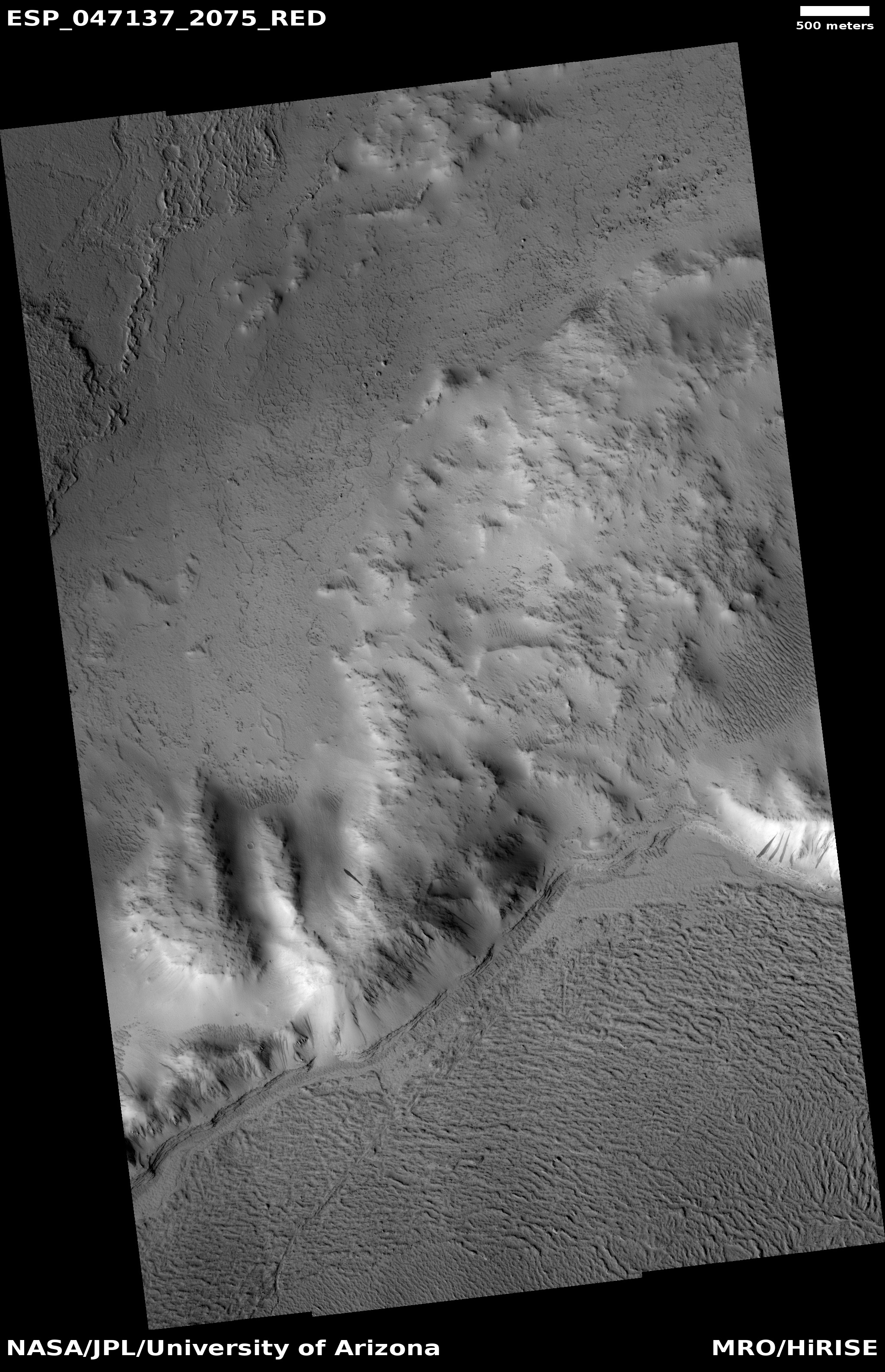
Wide view of layers, as seen by HiRISE under HiWish program

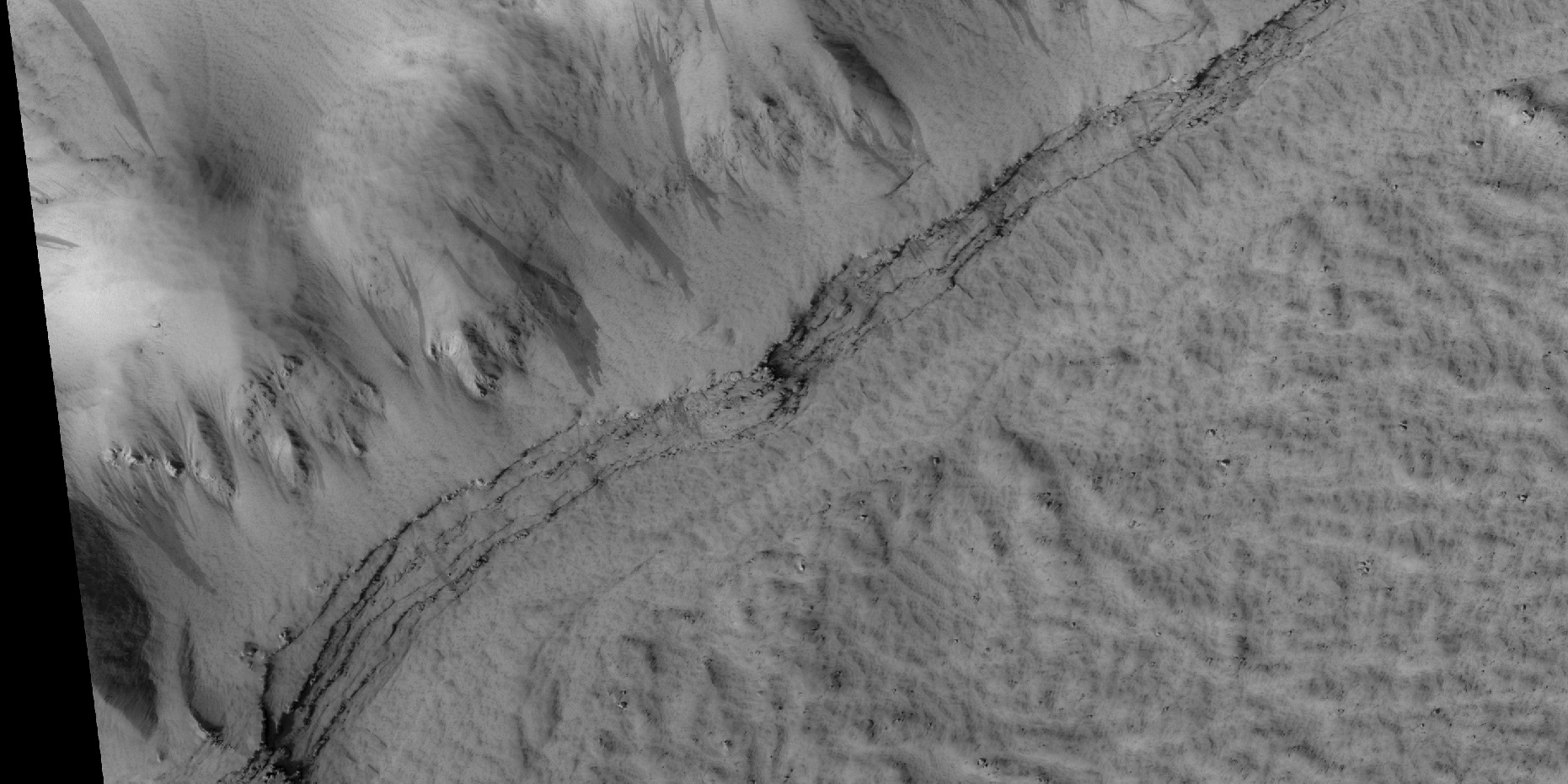
Close view of layers, as seen by HiRISE under HiWish program

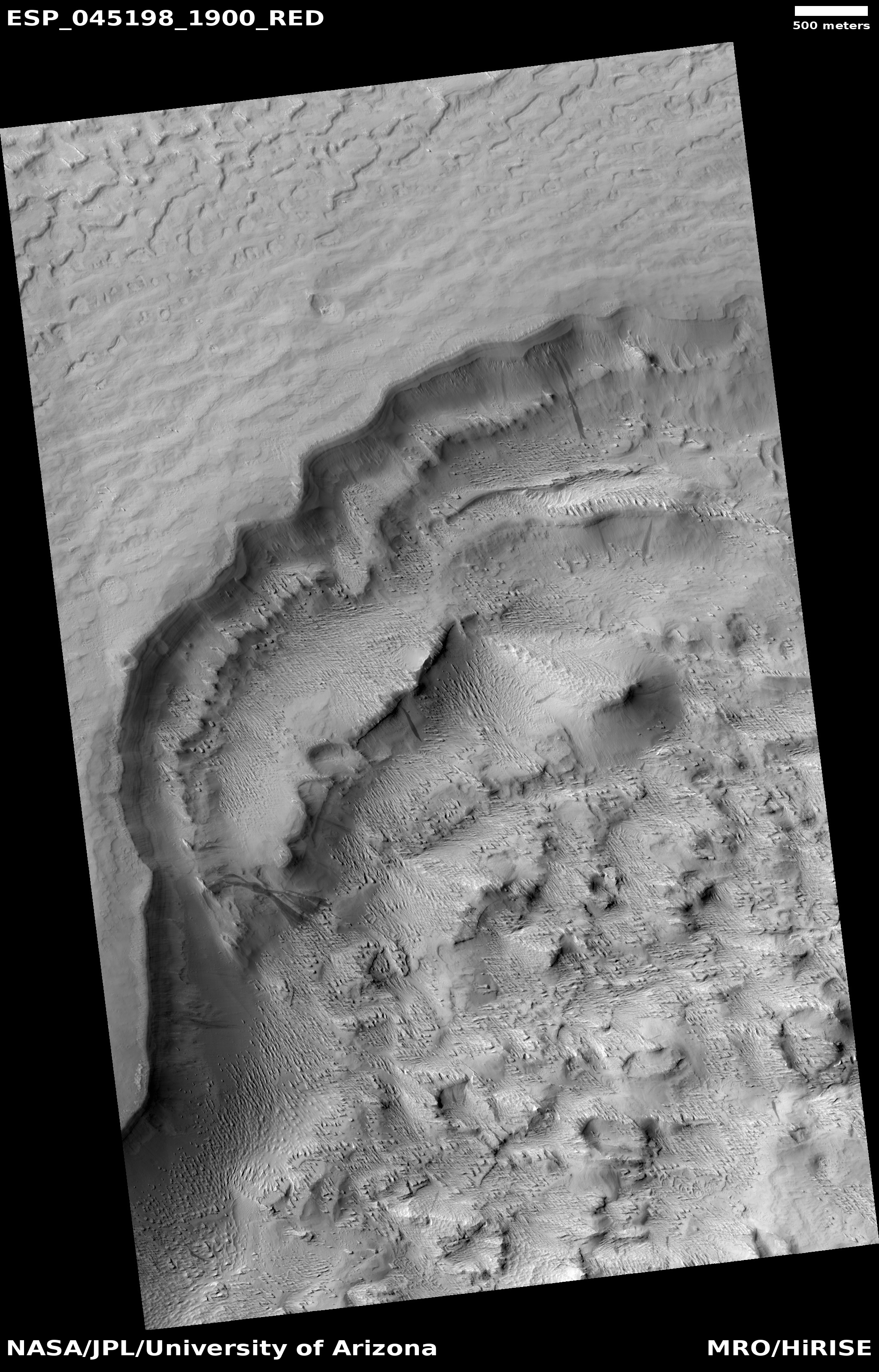
Wide view of scarp showing layers, as seen by HiRISE under HiWish program

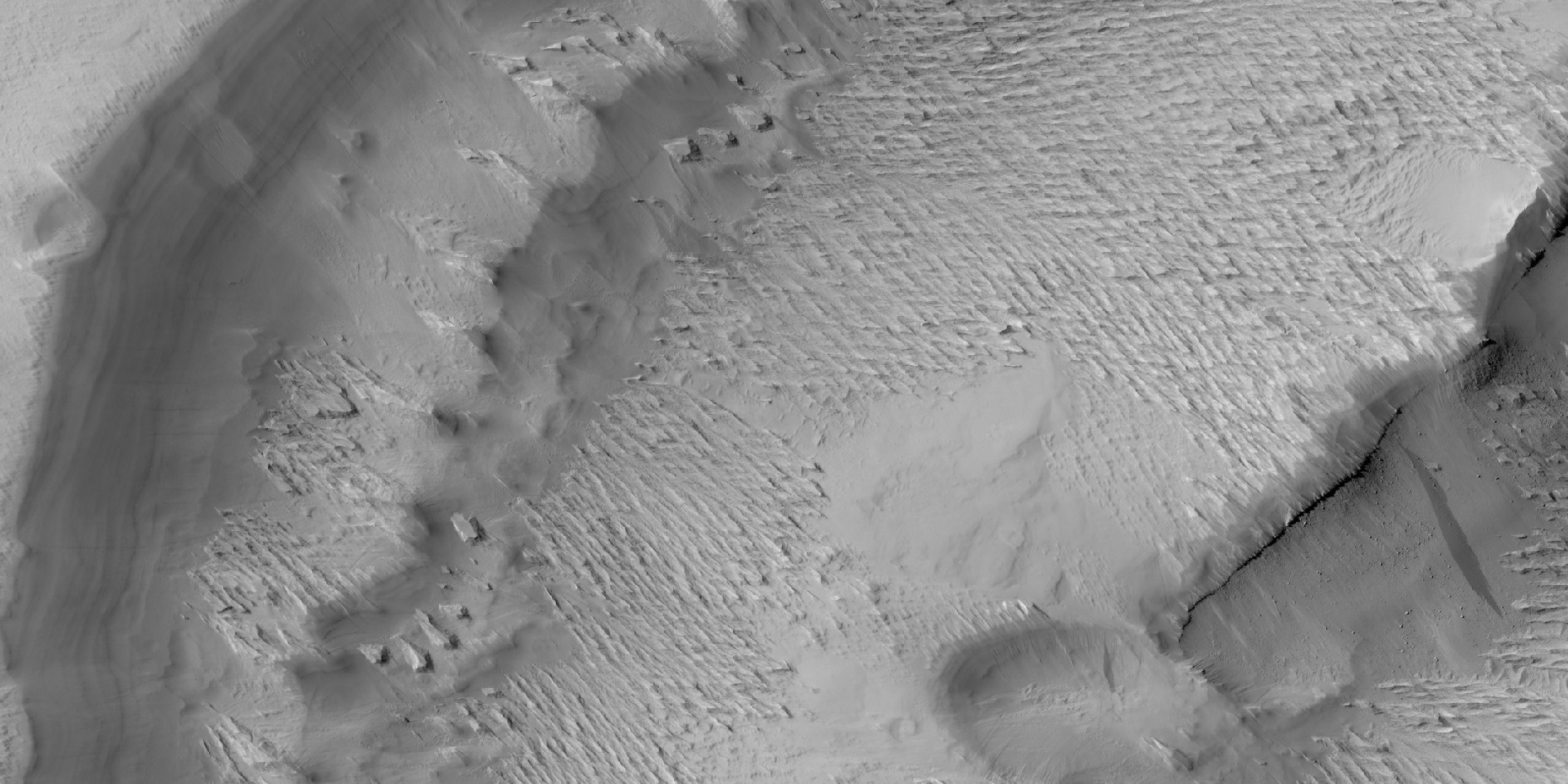
Close view of layers from previous image, as seen by HiRISE under HiWish program

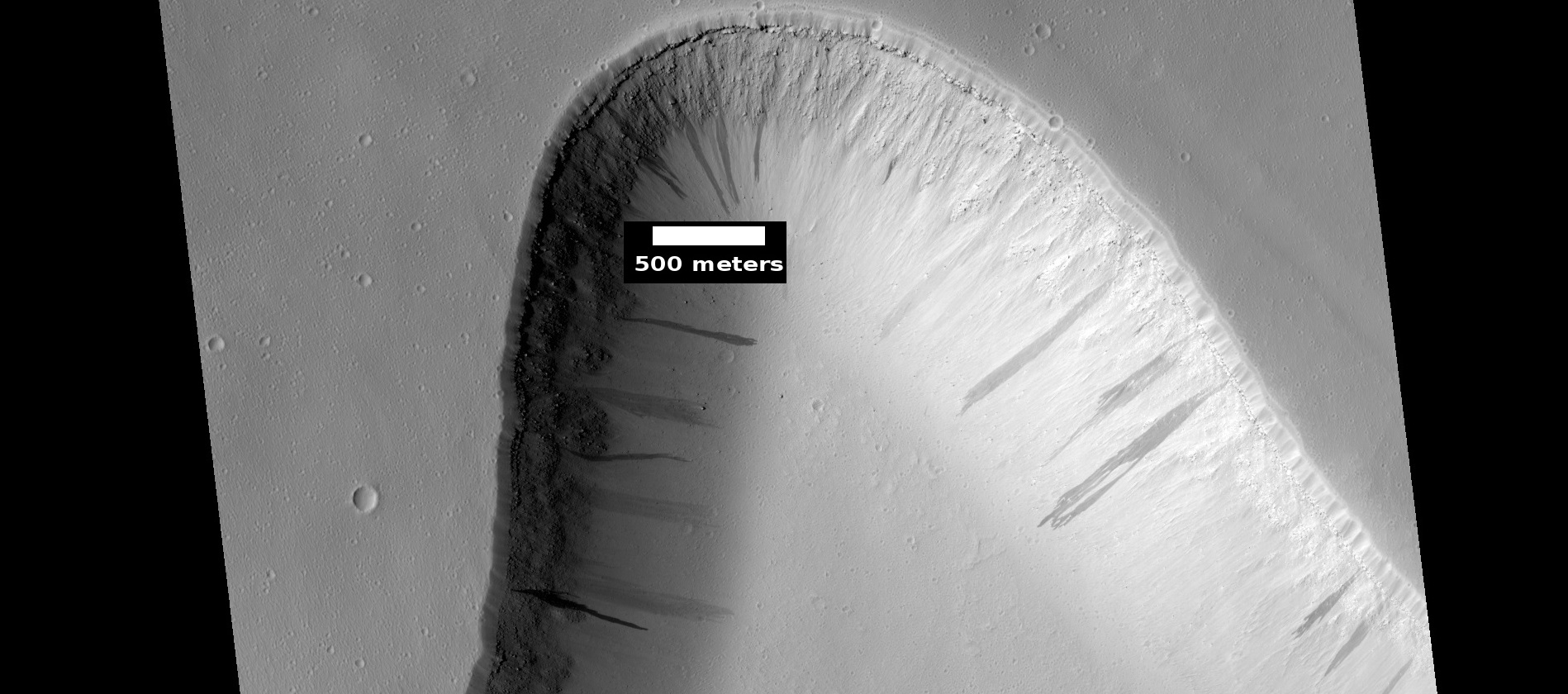
Layers in trough and dark slope streaks, as seen by HiRISE under HiWish program

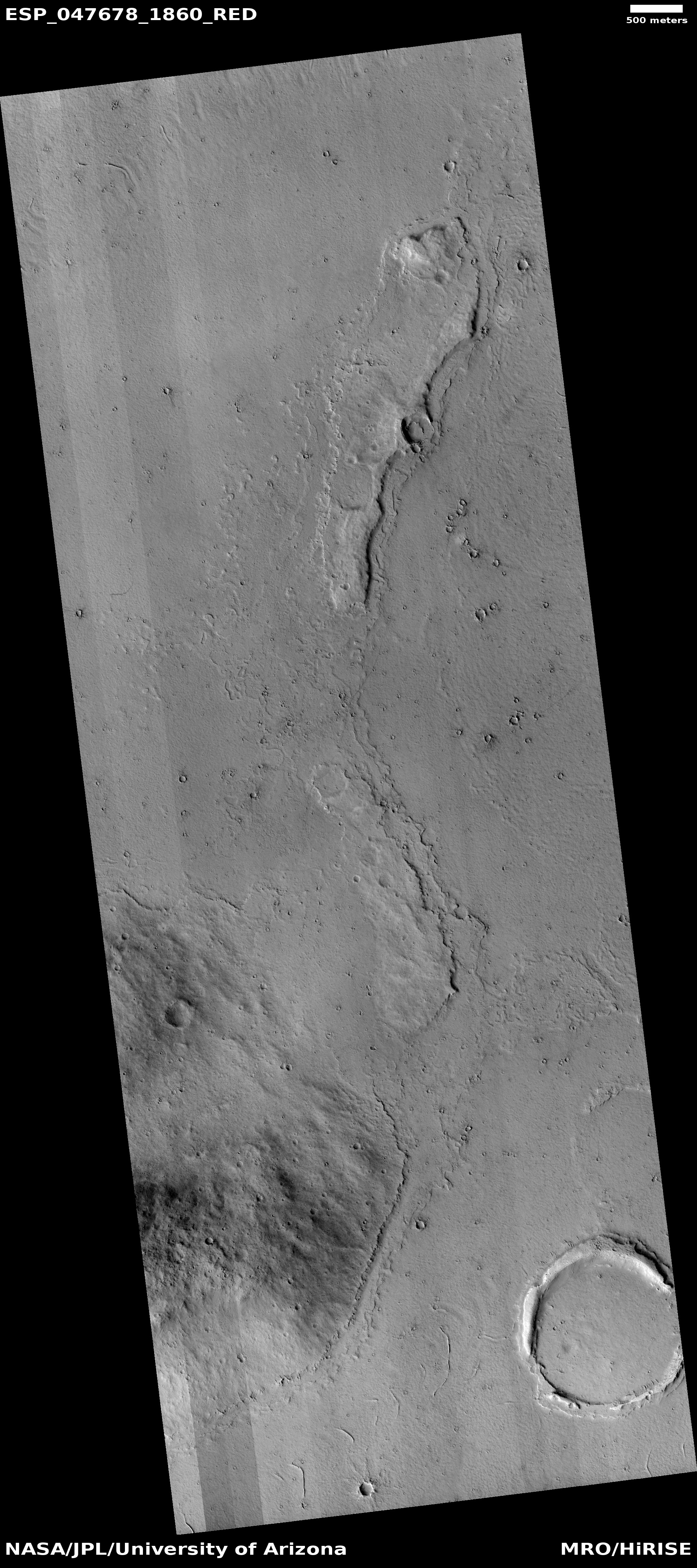
Wide view of layers, as seen by HiRISE under HiWish program

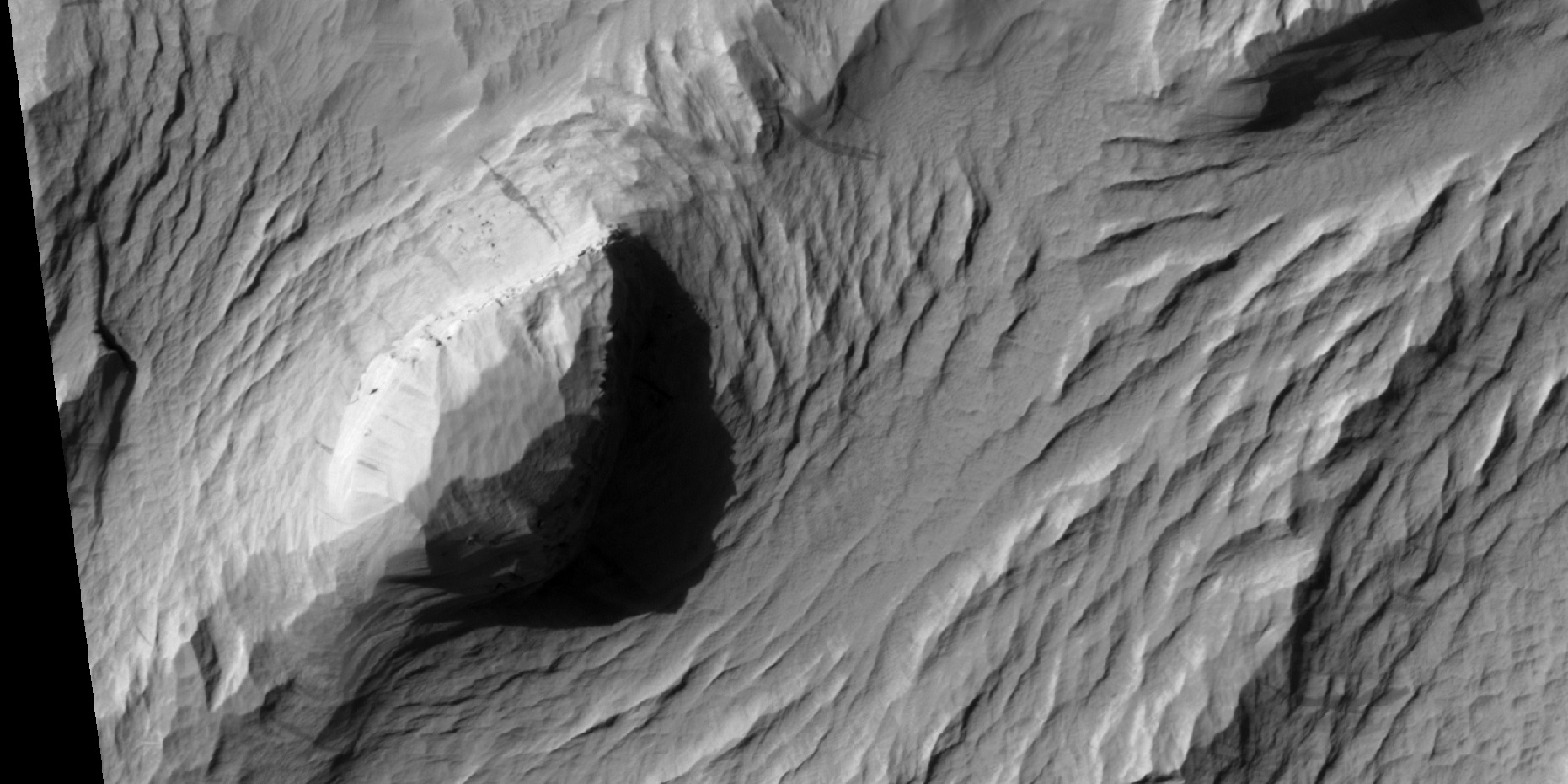
Layers and dark slope streaks, as seen by HiRISE under HiWish program

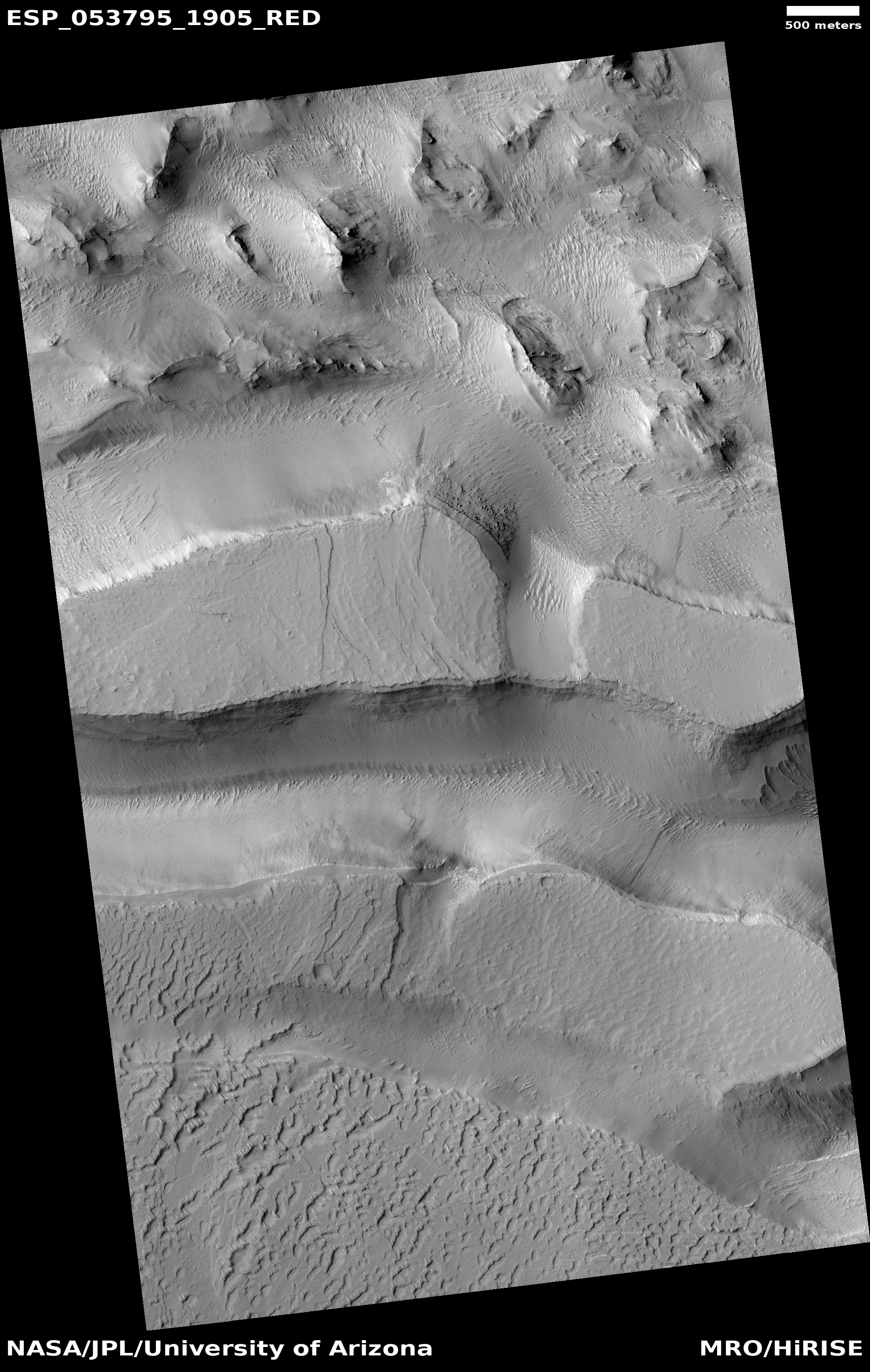
Layered mesas, as seen by HiRISE under HiWish program

== Dust devils ==
Dust devil tracks can be very pretty. They are caused by giant dust devils removing bright colored dust from the Martian surface; thereby exposing a dark layer. Dust devils on Mars have been photographed both from the ground and high overhead from orbit. They have even blown dust off the solar panels of two Rovers on Mars, thereby greatly extending their useful lifetime. The pattern of the tracks has been shown to change every few months. A study that combined data from the High Resolution Stereo Camera (HRSC) and the Mars Orbiter Camera (MOC) found that some large dust devils on Mars have a diameter of 700 metres (2,300 ft) and last at least 26 minutes.

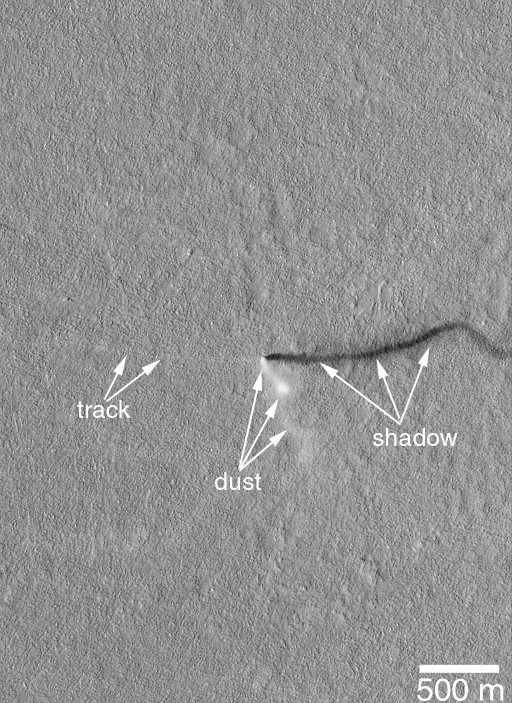
Martian Dust Devil - in Amazonis Planitia (April 10, 2001) (also) (video (02:19)).

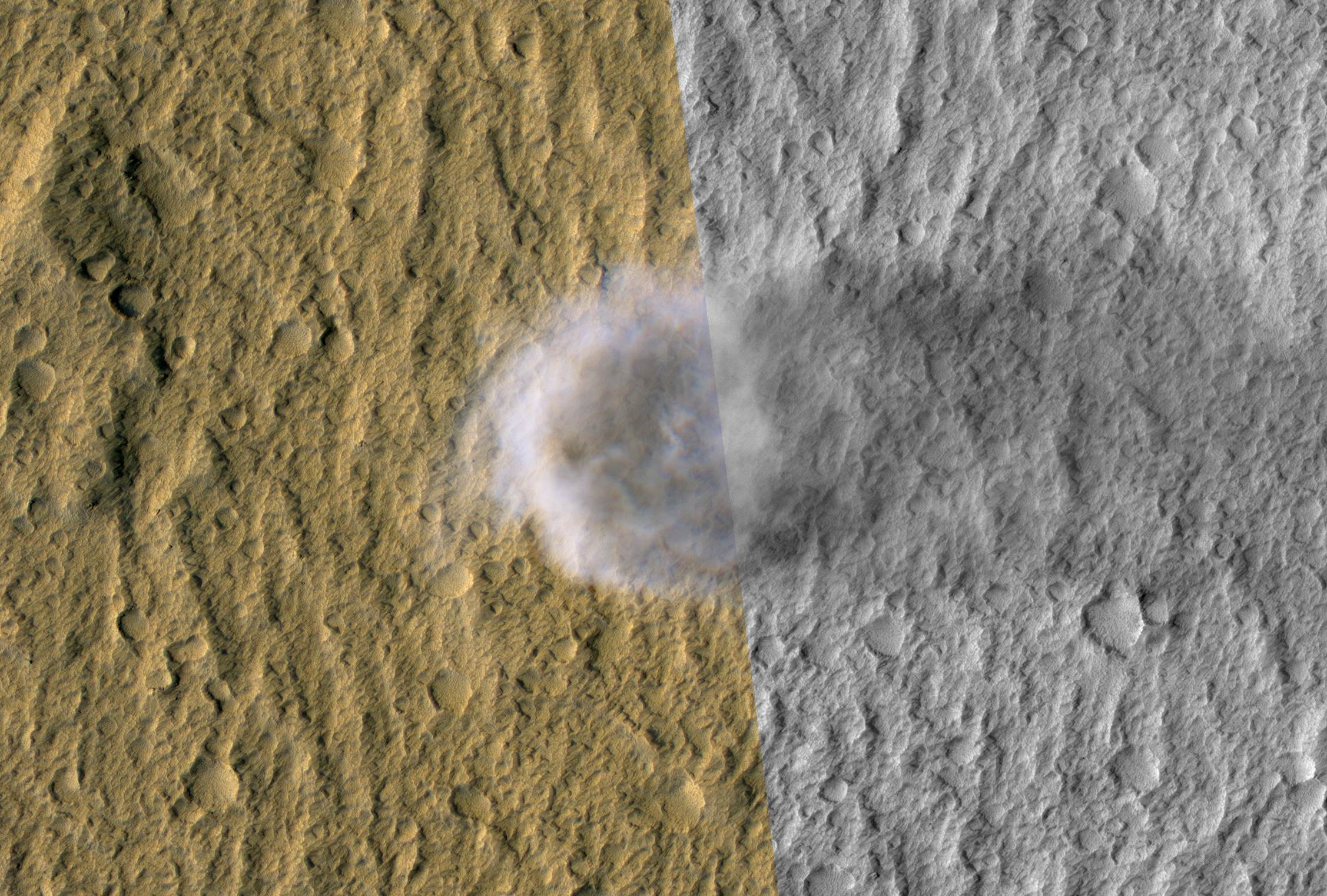
A dust devil on hilly terrain in the Amazonis region

== More images ==
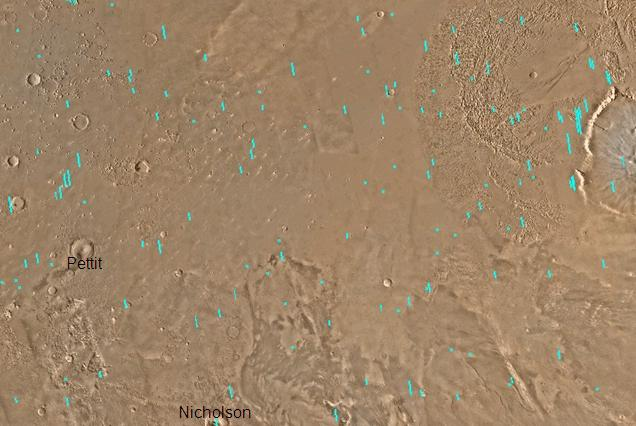
Map of Amazonis quadrangle

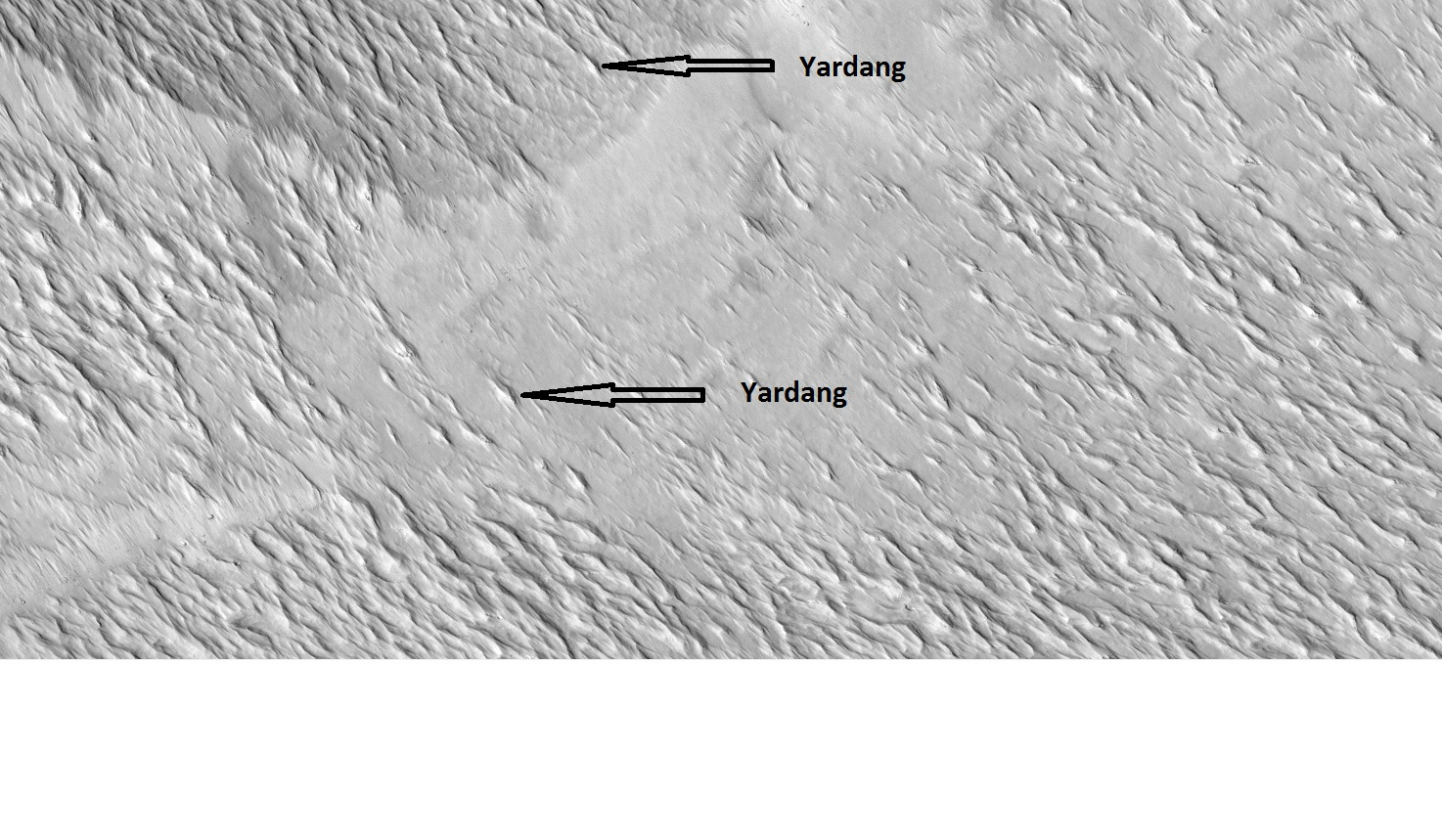
Yardangs in the Medusae Fossae formation, as seen by HiRISE under HiWish program

Tartarus Colles channel, as seen by HiRISE. Scale bar is 500 meters. Click on image to see bridge across channel.

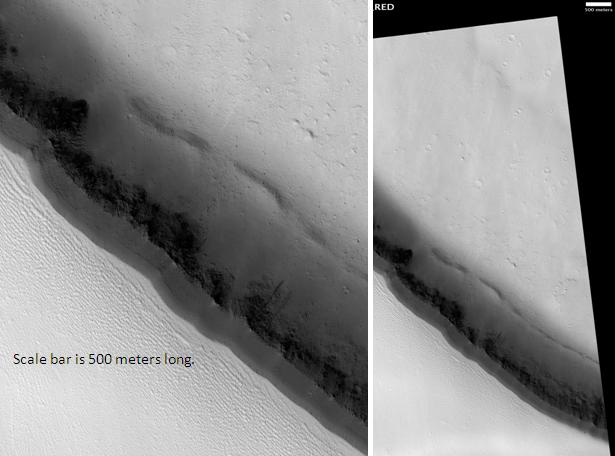
Olympus Mons scarp, as seen by HiRISE. Scale bar is 500 meters long.

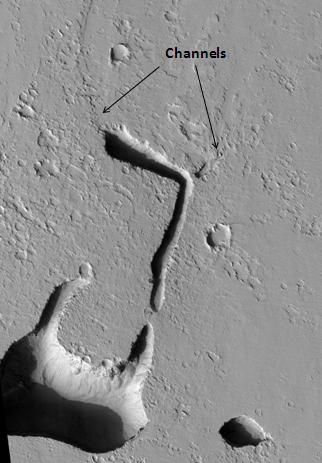
Channels From Fissure, as seen by HiRISE. The fissure probably started the water flowing to make the channel. The channels look somewhat better in the enlarged view of the original image.

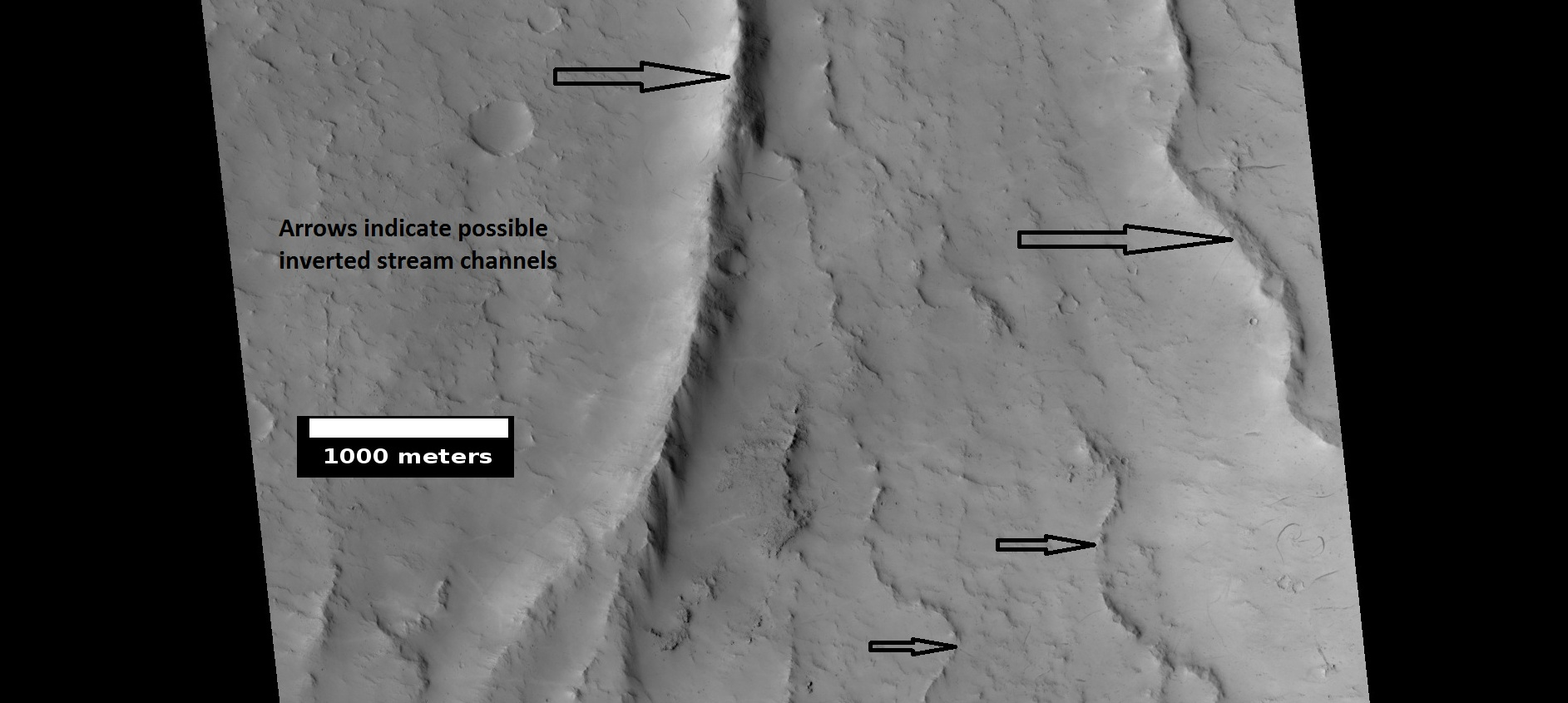
Possible inverted stream channels in Phlegra Dorsa region, as seen by HiRISE under HiWish program. The ridges were probably once stream valleys that have become full of sediment and cemented, so they became hardened against erosion which removed surrounding material.
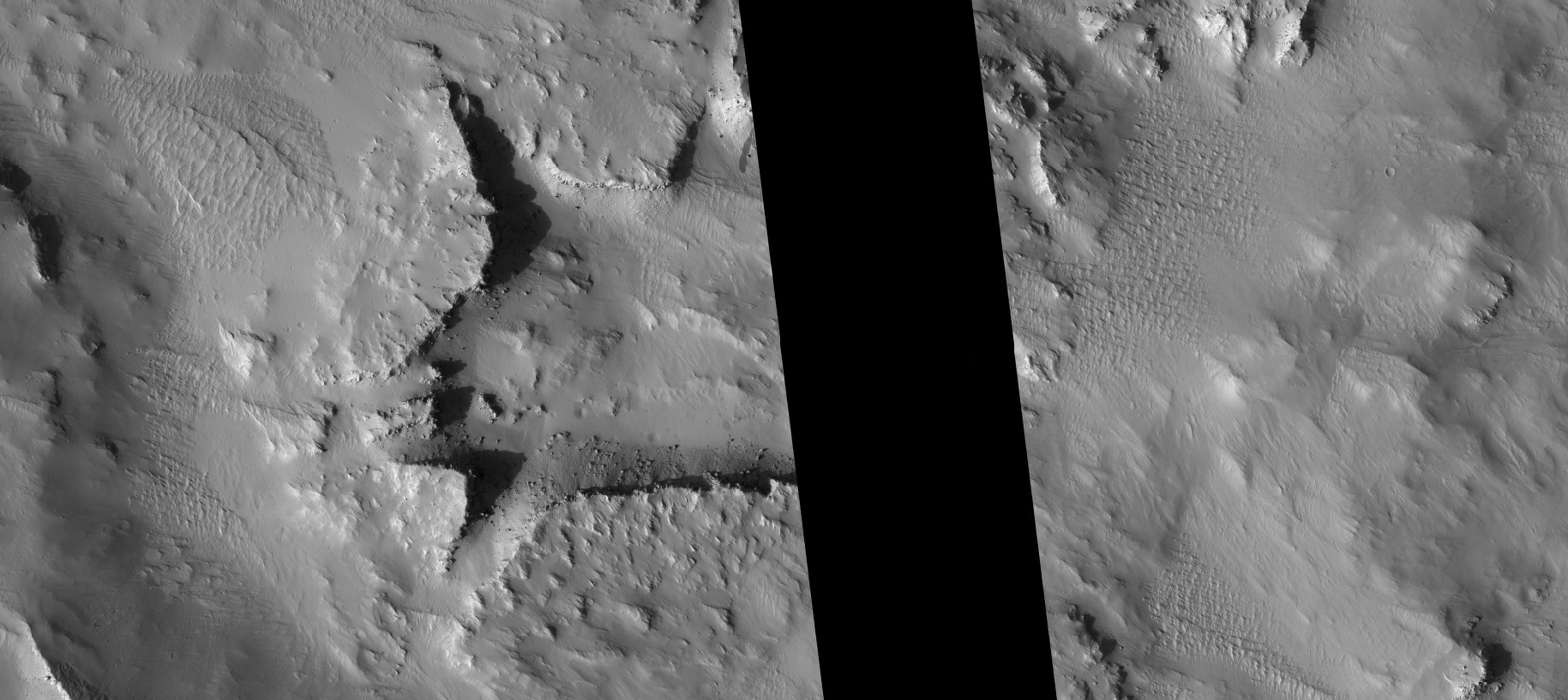
Tilted blocks It is as if something pushed up from under the ground.

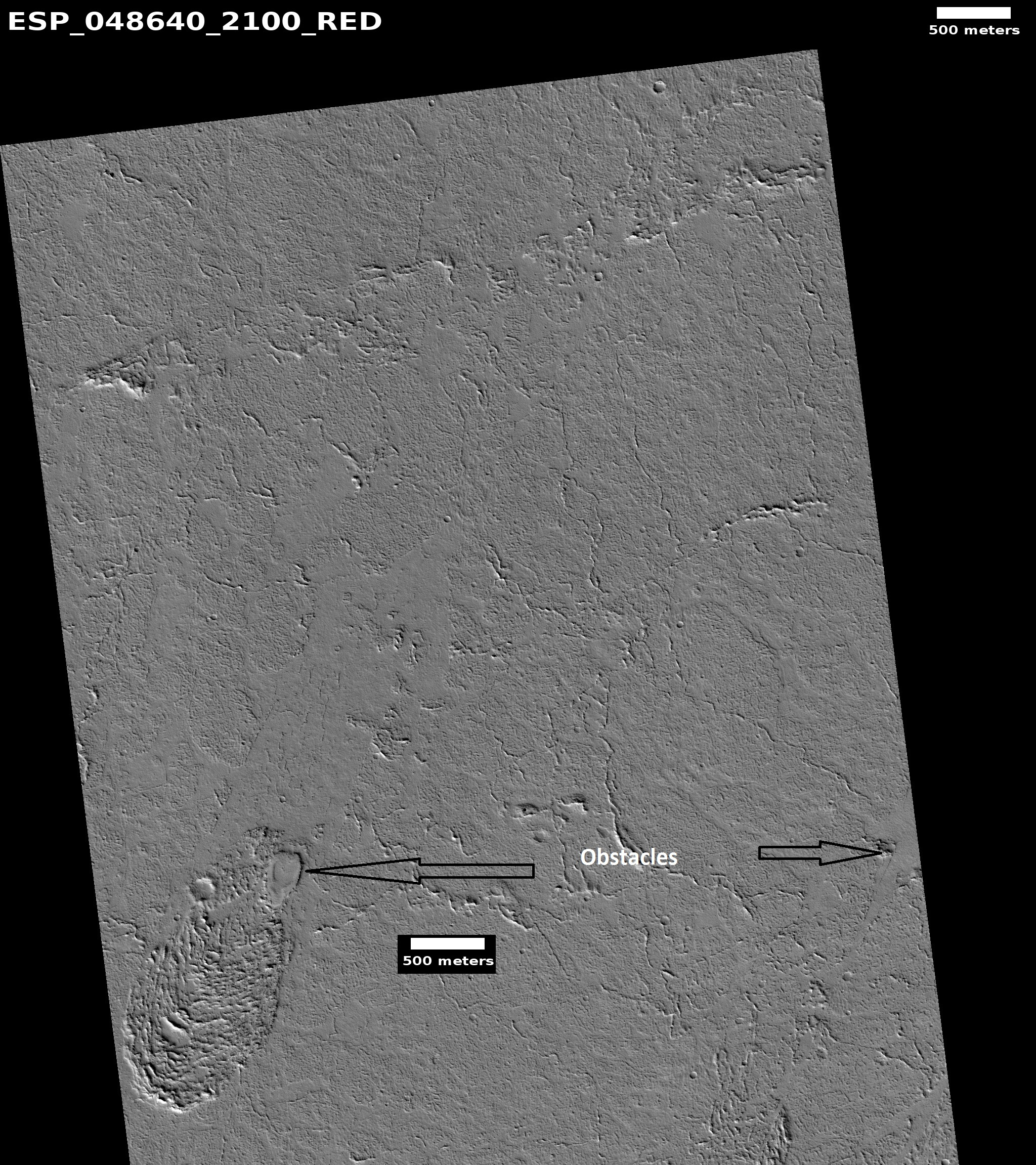
Lava flows affected by obstacles, as seen by HiRISE under HiWish program. Arrows show two obstacles that are changing the flow.

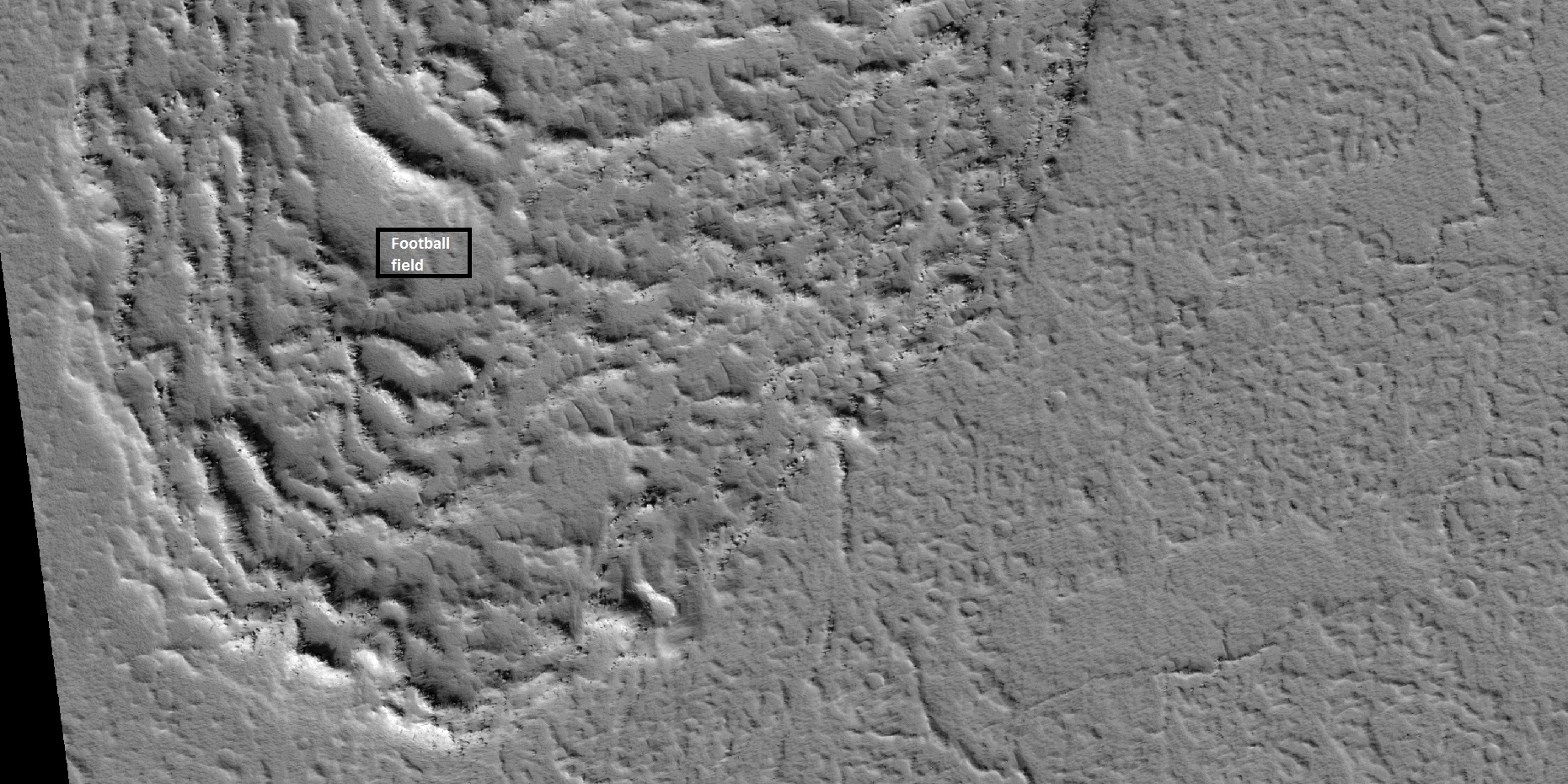
View of a lava lobe, as seen by HiRISE under HiWish program. The box shows the size of a football field.

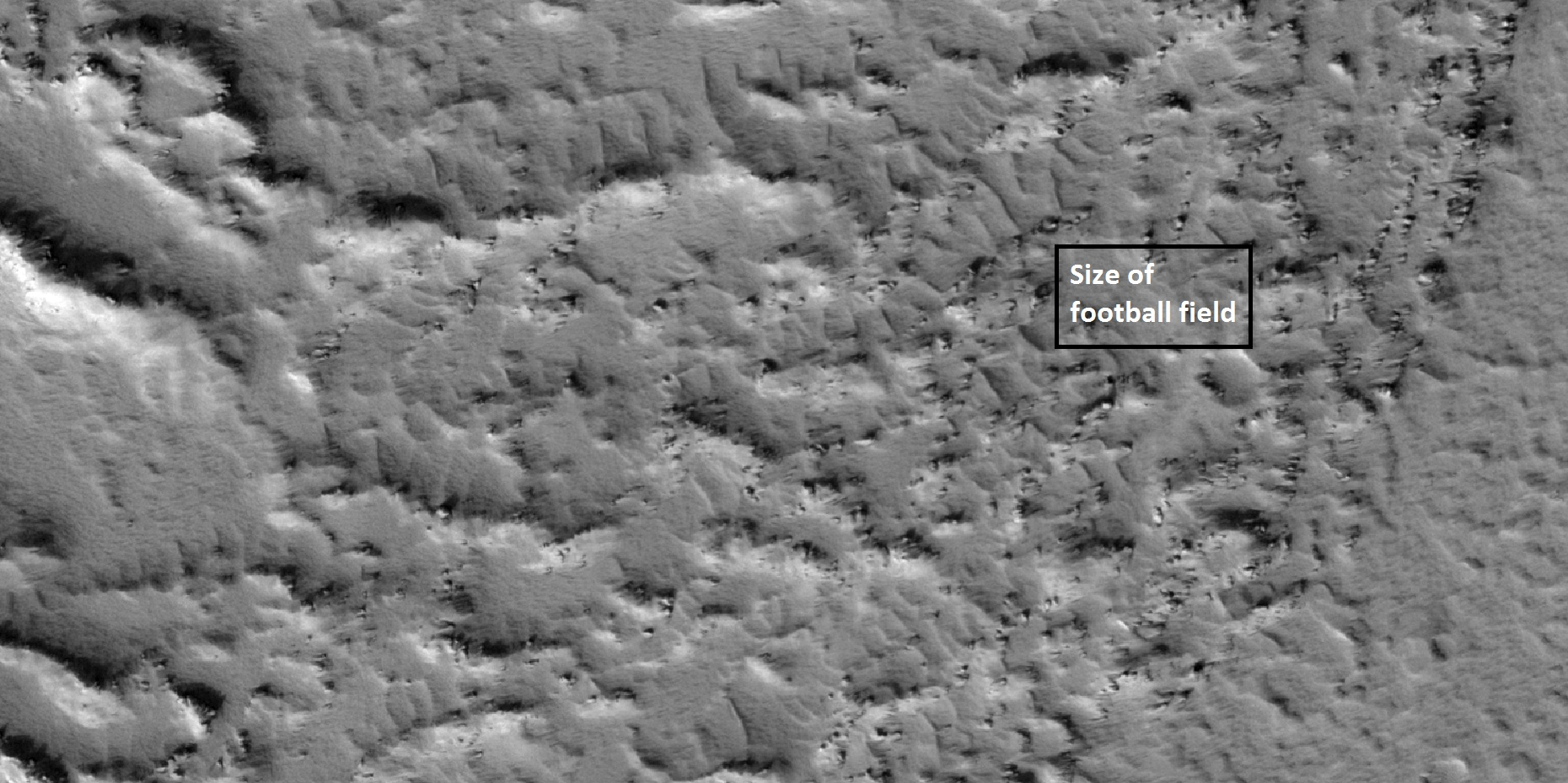
Close view of a lava lobe, as seen by HiRISE under HiWish program. The box shows the size of a football field.

== See also ==
- Gamma Ray Spectrometer (2001 Mars Odyssey)
- Geology of Mars
- Inverted relief
- Martian soil
- True polar wander on Mars
- Vallis (planetary geology)
- Water on Mars

MC-01 Mare Boreum (features)
MC-02 Diacria (features)		MC-03 Arcadia (features)	MC-04 Acidalium (features)	MC-05 Ismenius Lacus (features)		MC-06 Casius (features)	MC-07 Cebrenia (features)
MC-08 Amazonis (features)	MC-09 Tharsis (features)	MC-10 Lunae Palus (features)	MC-11 Oxia Palus (features)	MC-12 Arabia (features)	MC-13 Syrtis Major (features)	MC-14 Amenthes (features)	MC-15 Elysium (features)
MC-16 Memnonia (features)	MC-17 Phoenicis Lacus (features)	MC-18 Coprates (features)	MC-19 Margaritifer Sinus (features)	MC-20 Sinus Sabaeus (features)	MC-21 Iapygia (features)	MC-22 Mare Tyrrhenum (features)	MC-23 Aeolis (features)
MC-24 Phaethontis (features)		MC-25 Thaumasia (features)	MC-26 Argyre (features)	MC-27 Noachis (features)		MC-28 Hellas (features)	MC-29 Eridania (features)
MC-30 Mare Australe (features)
