= Endeavour (crater) =

Crater on Mars

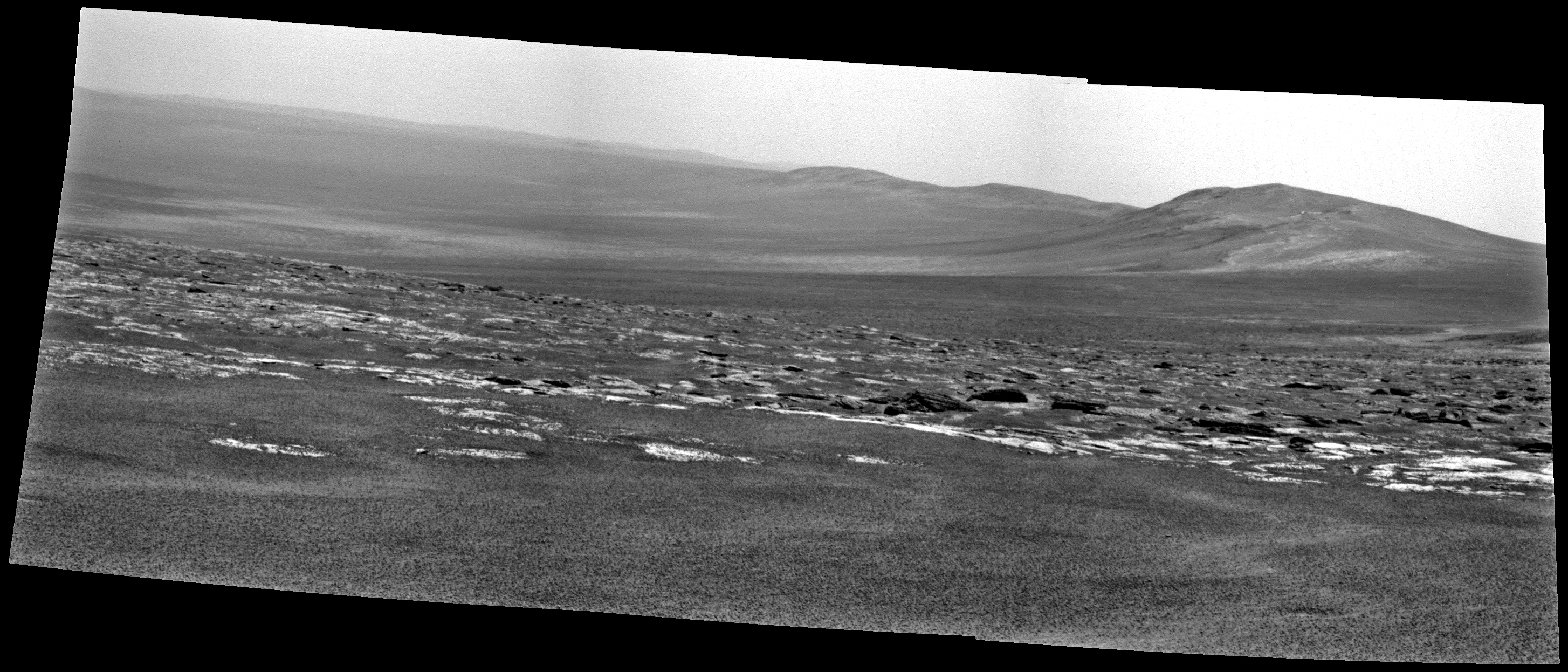
- Planet: Mars
- Region: Meridiani Planum
- Coordinates: 2.28°S 5.23°W
- Quadrangle: Margaritifer Sinus
- Diameter: 22 kilometers (14 miles)
- Depth: 300 meters (980 feet)
- Eponym: Endeavour, Saskatchewan, Canada (official name); HM Bark Endeavour (for early informal nickname)

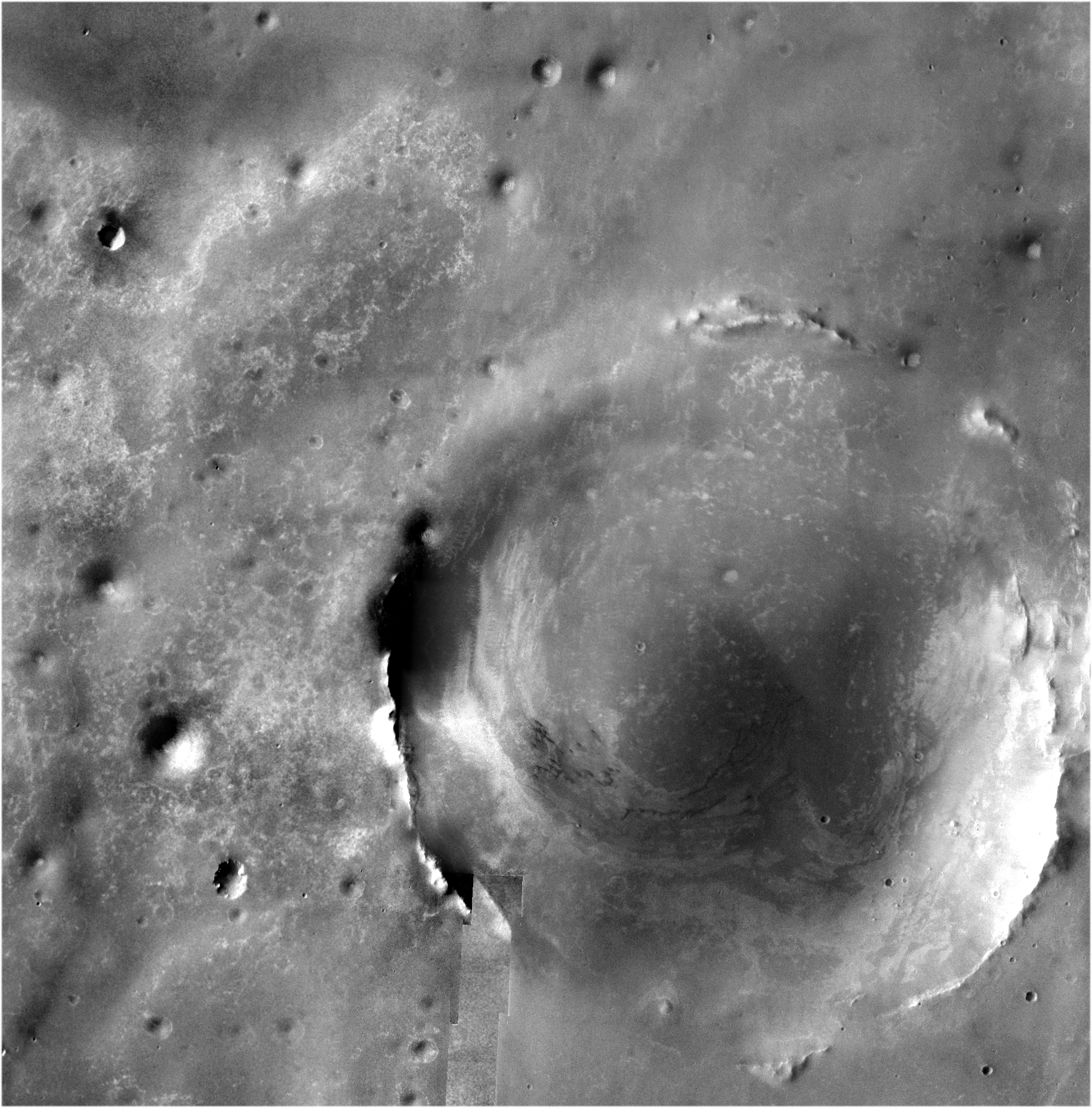
Endeavour as viewed from Mars orbit

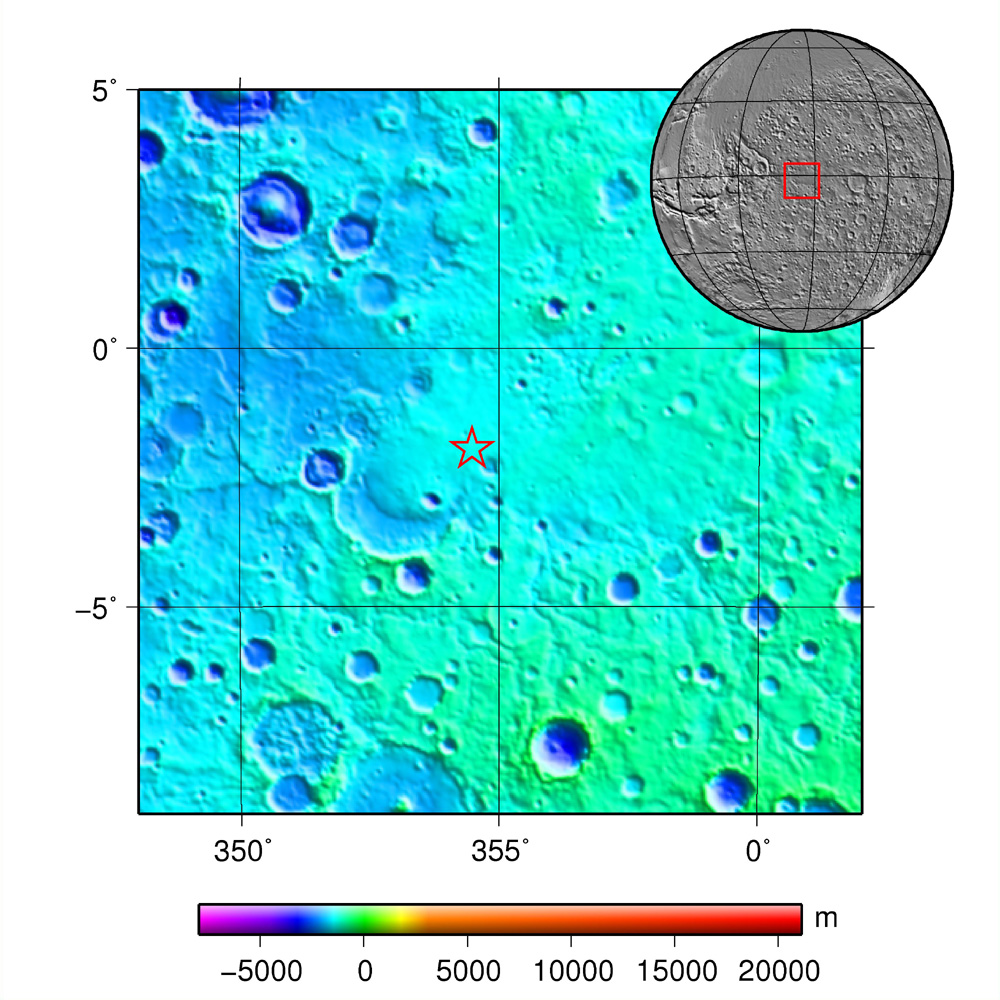
The tip of the bottom right of the star is the approximate location of the crater Endeavour on Mars

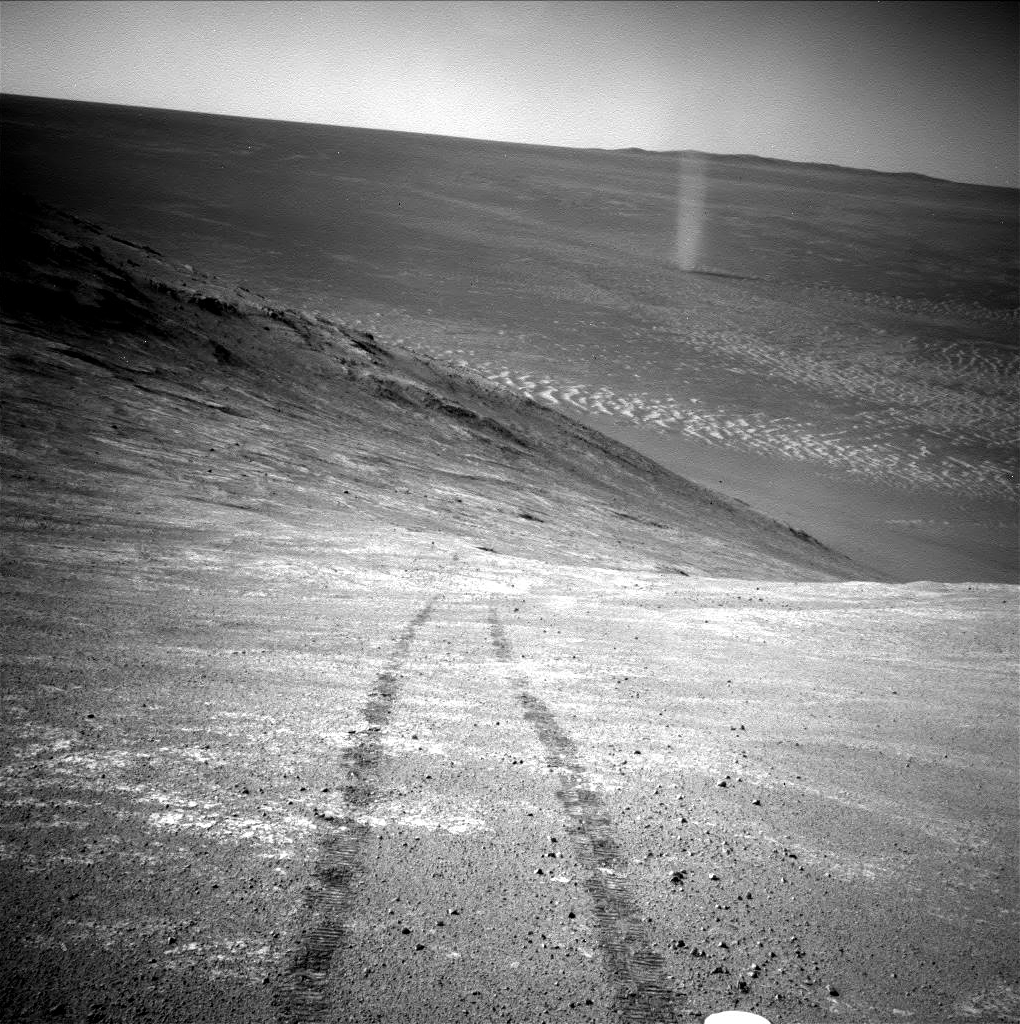
Opportunity images a Martian whirlwind on the floor of Endeavour (April 2016)

Endeavour is an impact crater located in the Meridiani Planum extraterrestrial plain within the Margaritifer Sinus quadrangle (MC-19) region of the planet Mars. Endeavour is about 22 kilometers (14 mi) in diameter. Using Mars Reconnaissance Orbiter data, phyllosilicate-bearing outcrops have been detected along its rim. These minerals may have formed under wet conditions in a low-acidic environment during the early history of Mars. There are raised rim segments to the north, east, and southwest. The rim has become worn, rounded and degraded, with infilling of plains material in a manner similar to the Victoria crater.

When compared to the surrounding plains, the crater floor shows an enhanced spectral signature of basalt and hematite. The interior contains two groups of dune fields. Images taken since 2008 show evidence of changes in some of the associated formations, which may be evidence of active erosion by the martian wind over a period of two to three years. The plains surrounding the rim show evidence of polyhydrated sulfate.

The Mars Exploration Rover-B Opportunity began travelling toward this crater in August 2008, with the rim coming into sight on March 7, 2009, and arriving at the edge on August 9, 2011.

Endeavour averages about 200 to 300 metres (660 to 980 ft) deep, with an area in its southeast that goes down to 500 metres (1,600 ft) deep, according to a publication called Degradation of Endeavour Crater, Mars by the Smithsonian Institution. The south-west depression goes down to an elevation of −1,980 metres (−6,500 ft), the horse-shoe shaped depression sits in the south-east quadrant and is around minus −1,800 to −1,900 metres (−5,900 to −6,200 ft) elevation, which is about 400 metres (1,300 ft) below the surrounding plains. It is noted that the crater has undergone various erosion processes, with wind being one cause.

== Nomenclature ==
The International Astronomical Union named the crater after a town in Canada, Endeavour, Saskatchewan. The name was approved on 20 October 2008. Due to rules for naming craters, it is officially named after the Canadian town, but the reason this name was proposed was because rover team was using informal nicknames based on a voyage of HMS Endeavour.

An informal working nickname by the Mars mission for the crater was Endeavour, and features of it, are based on the voyage of HM Bark Endeavour, a British Royal Navy research vessel commanded by Lieutenant James Cook on his first voyage of discovery, to Fiji, New Zealand and Australia from 1769 to 1771, using Australian places named by James Cook. Examples include: Cape Dromedary, Point Hicks, Byron Bay, Cape Tribulation, Cape Byron, and Cape York. The purpose of the voyage was to observe the transit of Venus, to accurately measure the distance to the Sun, then to explore lands found on the return journey.

== Geology ==
The crater is understood by the 2010s to have two main rock types, the Shoemaker Formation and the Matijevic Formation. It has been classified as a complex crater and it is thought to be so old many of its features have been worn away. Some questions were raised about the tilt of the rim, however understanding is hampered by a lack of knowledge about Martian impact craters: Endeavour was the largest Martian impact crater up to that time to be studied that closely. An example of the difficulty of studying Mars features is also apparent with Orcus Patera, which has various volcanic, tectonic, or cratering events explanations for its formation. One famous Mars realization was that what was then called Nix Olympica was a volcano, and then renamed Olympus Mons thanks to Mariner 9 orbiter observations in the early 1970s. Endeavour was identified as having clay minerals, as detected from orbit by Mars Reconnaissance Orbiter, which according to theories at that time indicated rock from an older, wetter, time period on Mars. This type of rock is different from what prevails in other areas of surrounding plains.

What is expected to be a fluid-carved gully was identified at Endeavour, probably water. This gully is targeted for exploration by the MER-B rover mission as of October 2016. It reached the gully in 2017 and it was named Perseverance Valley

=== Mineral map of surrounding ===
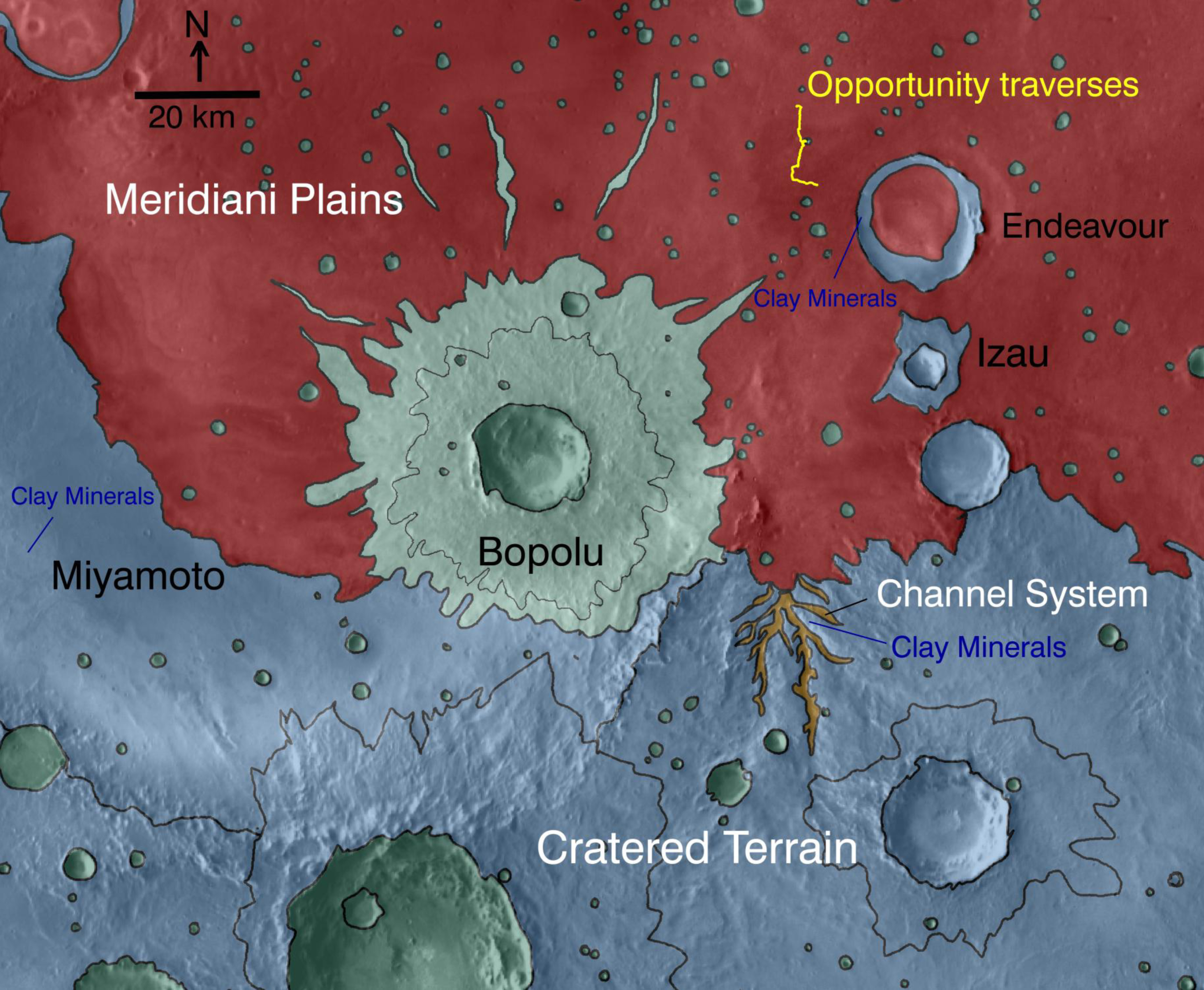
Colored for minerals. Opportunity traverse is dated to 2010 while it was still on its way to Endeavour. The coloring is based on geological information as observed by the Mars Reconnaissance Orbiter CRISM instrument

== Western rim ==
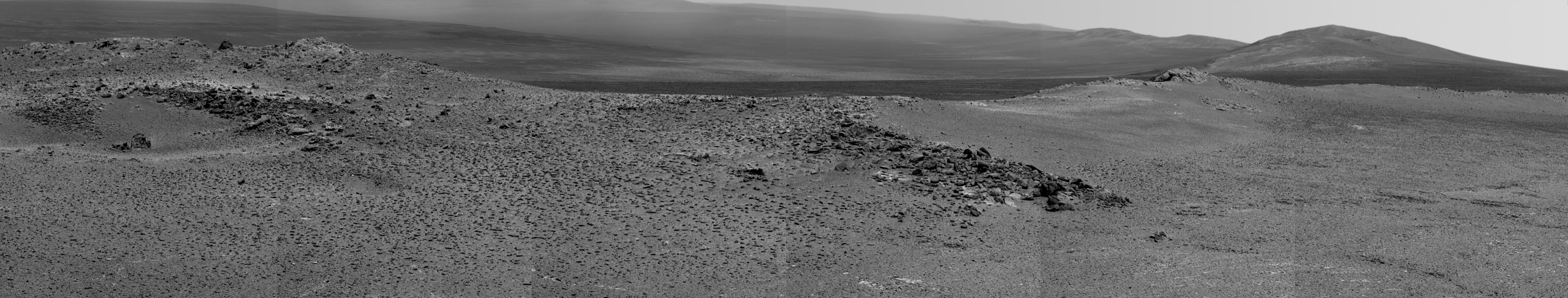
The crater Endeavour

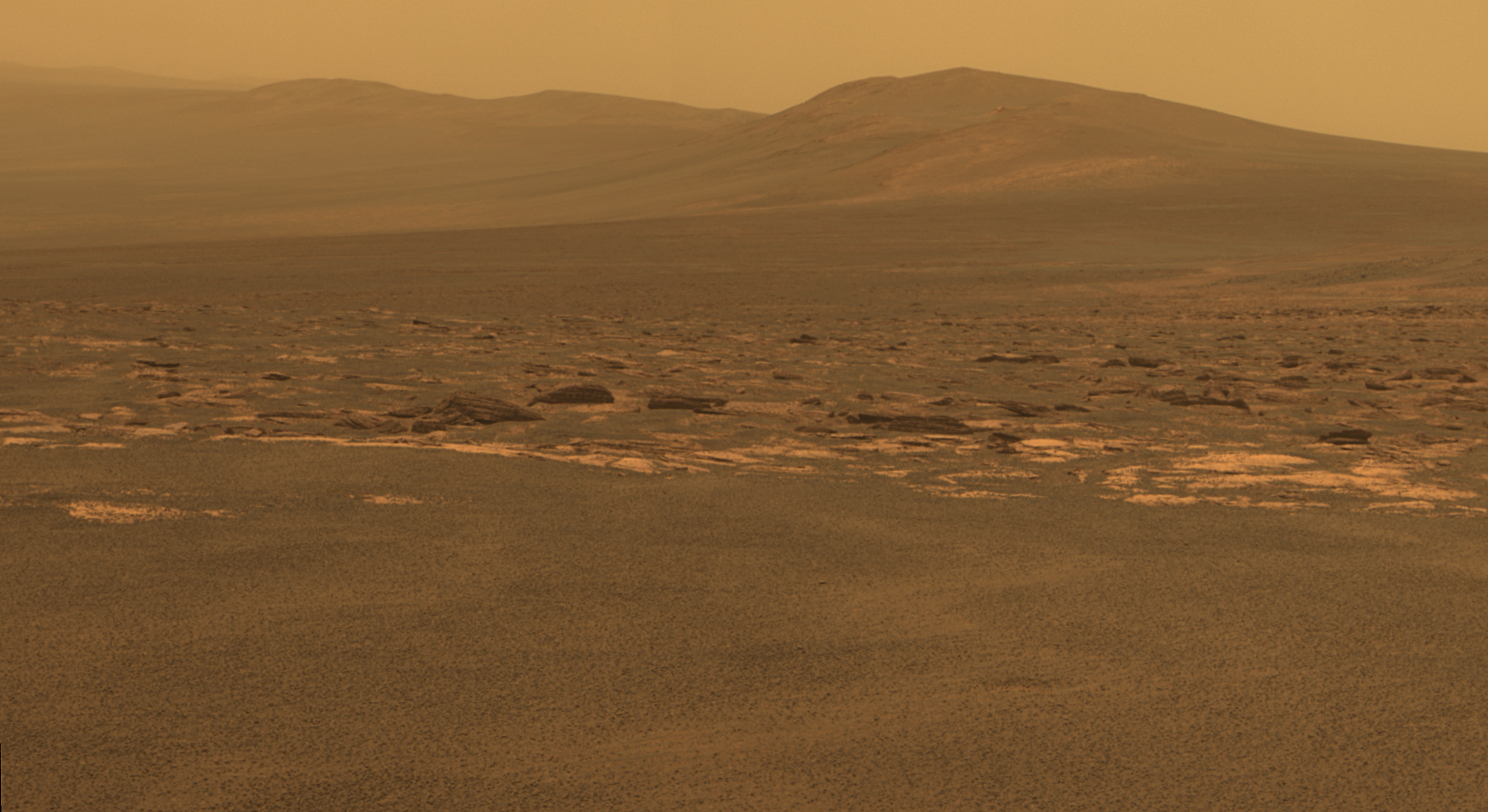
Western rim of the crater as seen from Cape York looking south, with the first ridge being Solander Point

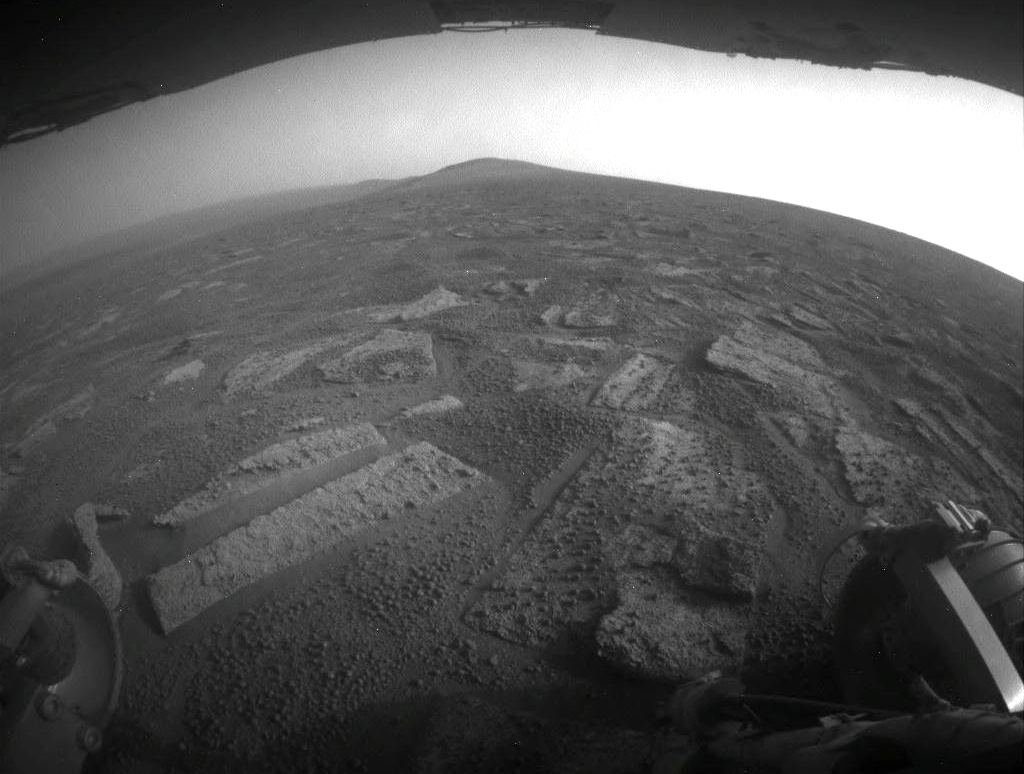
Hazcam image of Botany Bay and Solander Point (2013)

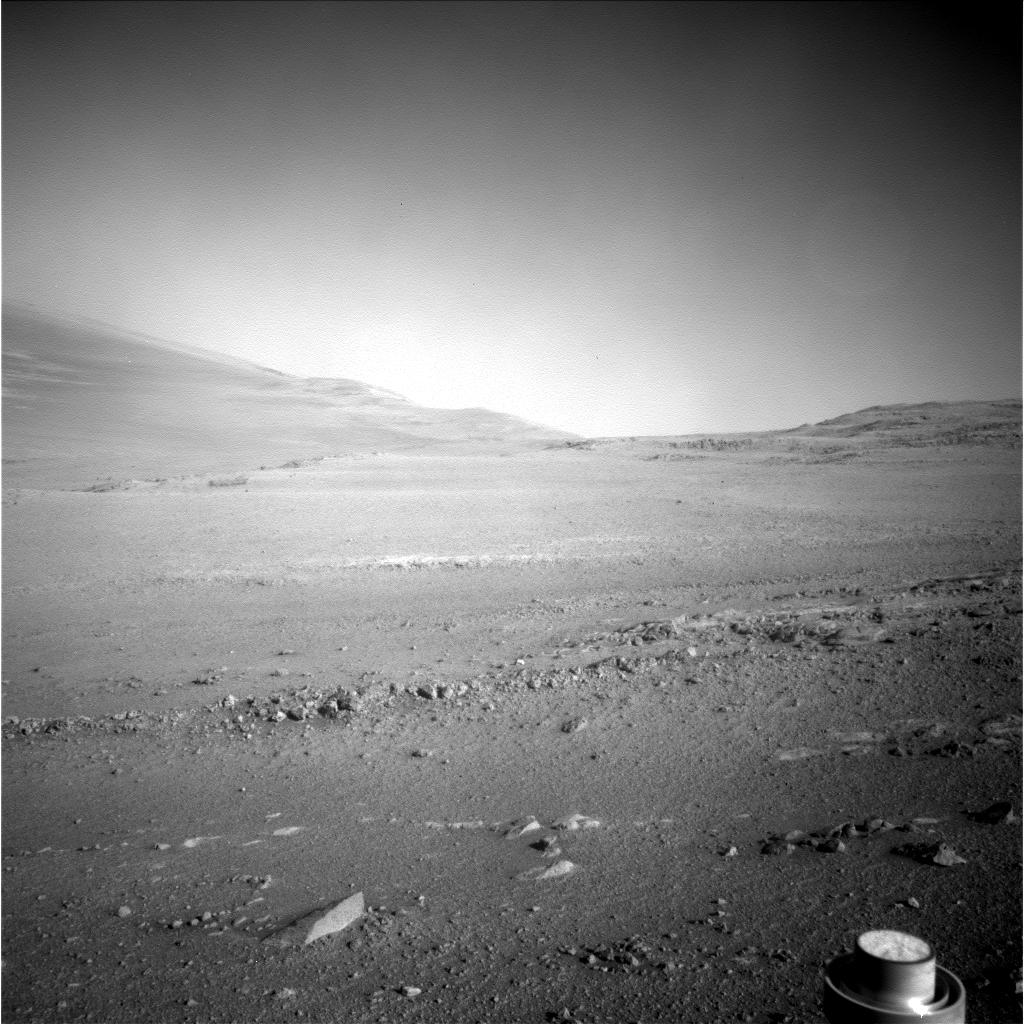
MER-B NavCam image Sol 4959 Start of January 2018, looking along the rim of Endeavour south of the gully (P.V.)

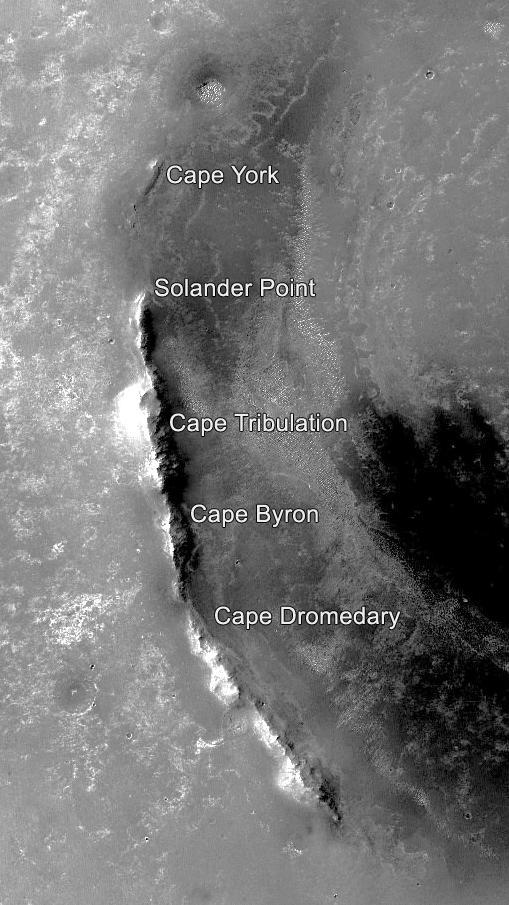
Annotated map various locations on Endeavour's western rim

- Cape York (Mars), at the northern end of the Eastern rim
  - Greeley Haven (MER-B over-Mars-wintered here)
  - Matijevic Hill
  - Odyssey Crater
  - Shoemaker Ridge
  - Spirit Point (MER-B reached here in August 2011)
- Sutherland Point
- Nobby's Head, just below Cape York
- Botany Bay, an open area between Cape York and Solander Point
- Solander Point
- Murray Ridge
- Pilinger Point
- Widowak Ridge
- Ulysses crater
- Cape Tribulation
  - Marathon Valley
  - Spirit Mound
- Cape Bryon
- Perseverance Valley, erosion network in this section of the rim, reached by MER-B in 2017
- Cape Dromedary
- Point Hicks
- Torres Strait (from the end of Point Hicks to Batavia on the southern rim)

The next rim section proceeding counter-clockwise around the crater is Batavia, on the southern end of the whole crater but East of Torres Strait

=== Western rim mineral map ===
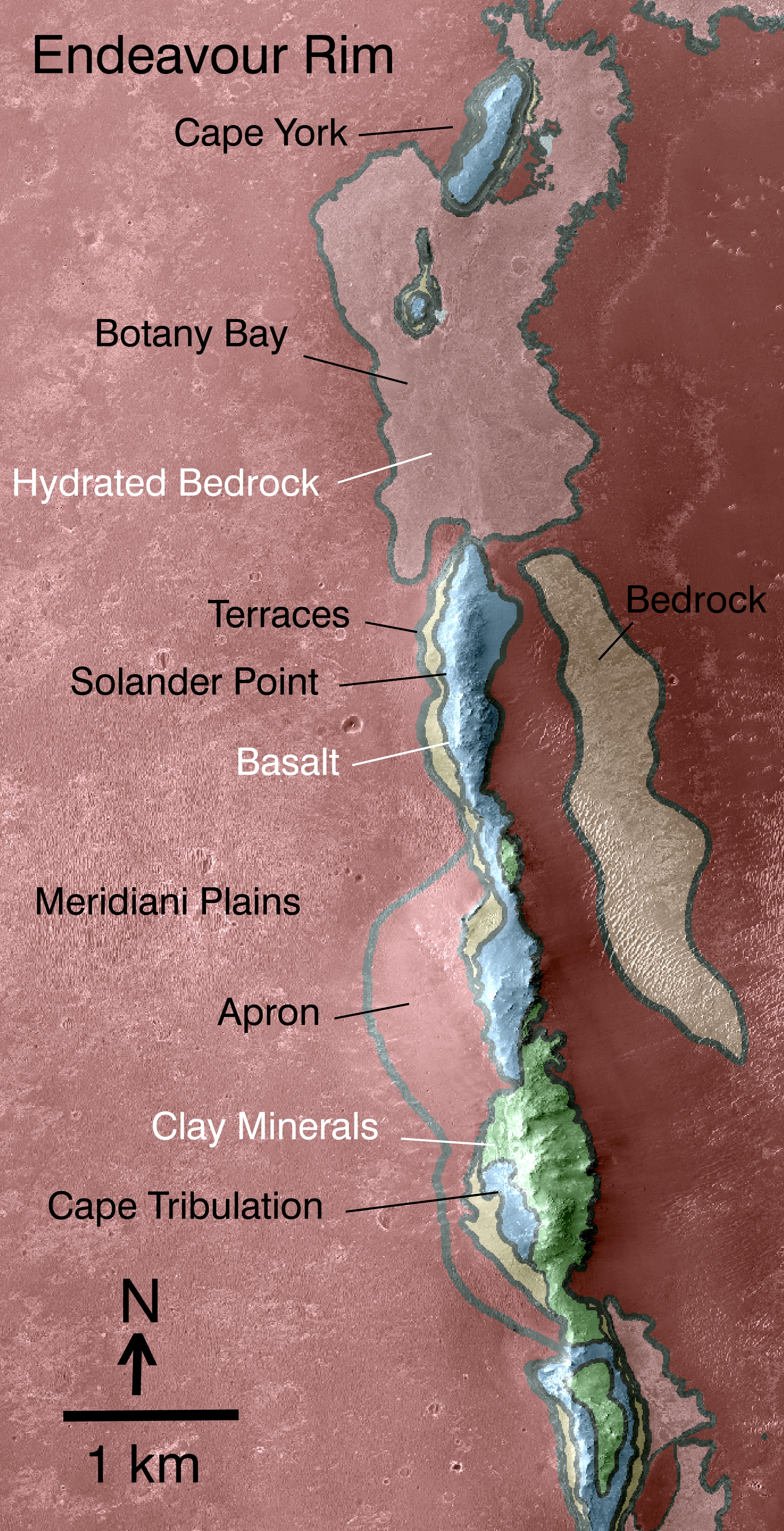
This is a geological map based on MRO's CRISM observations

=== Western rim elevation ===
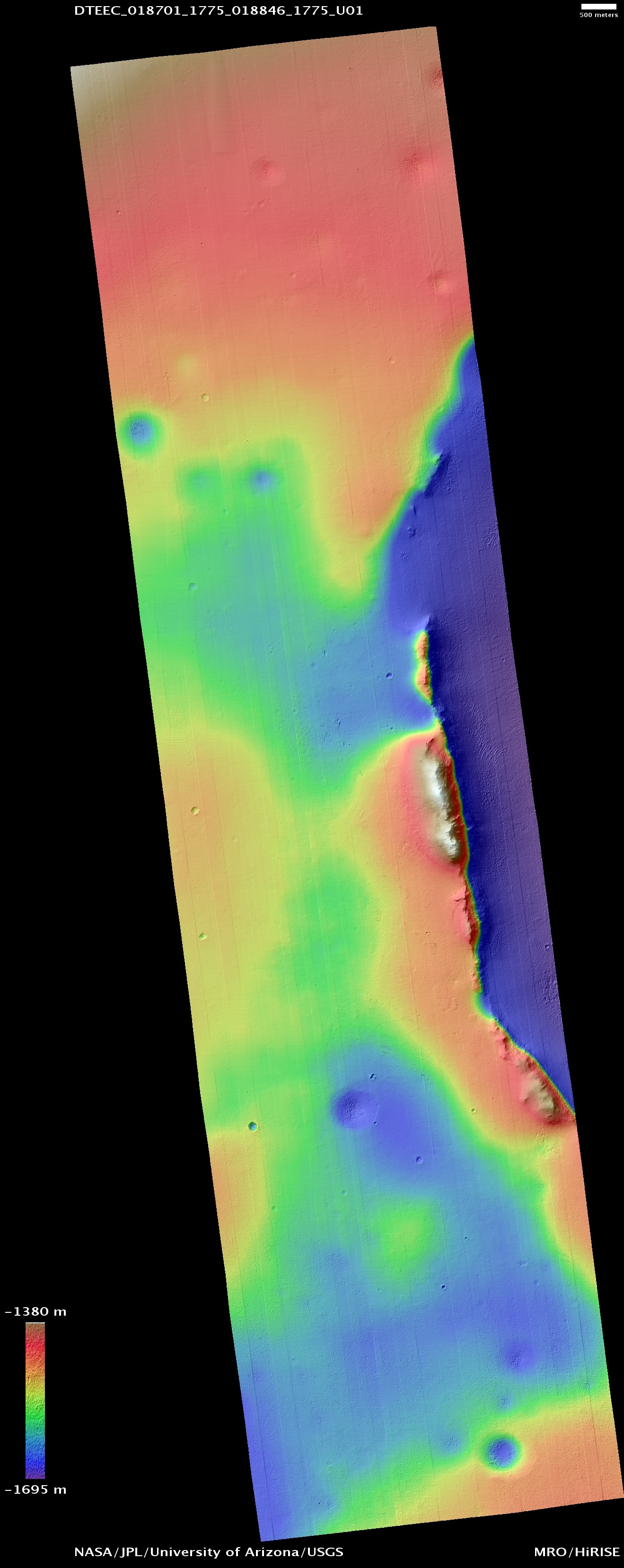
Elevation map from MRO, a digital terrain model

=== Western rim ===
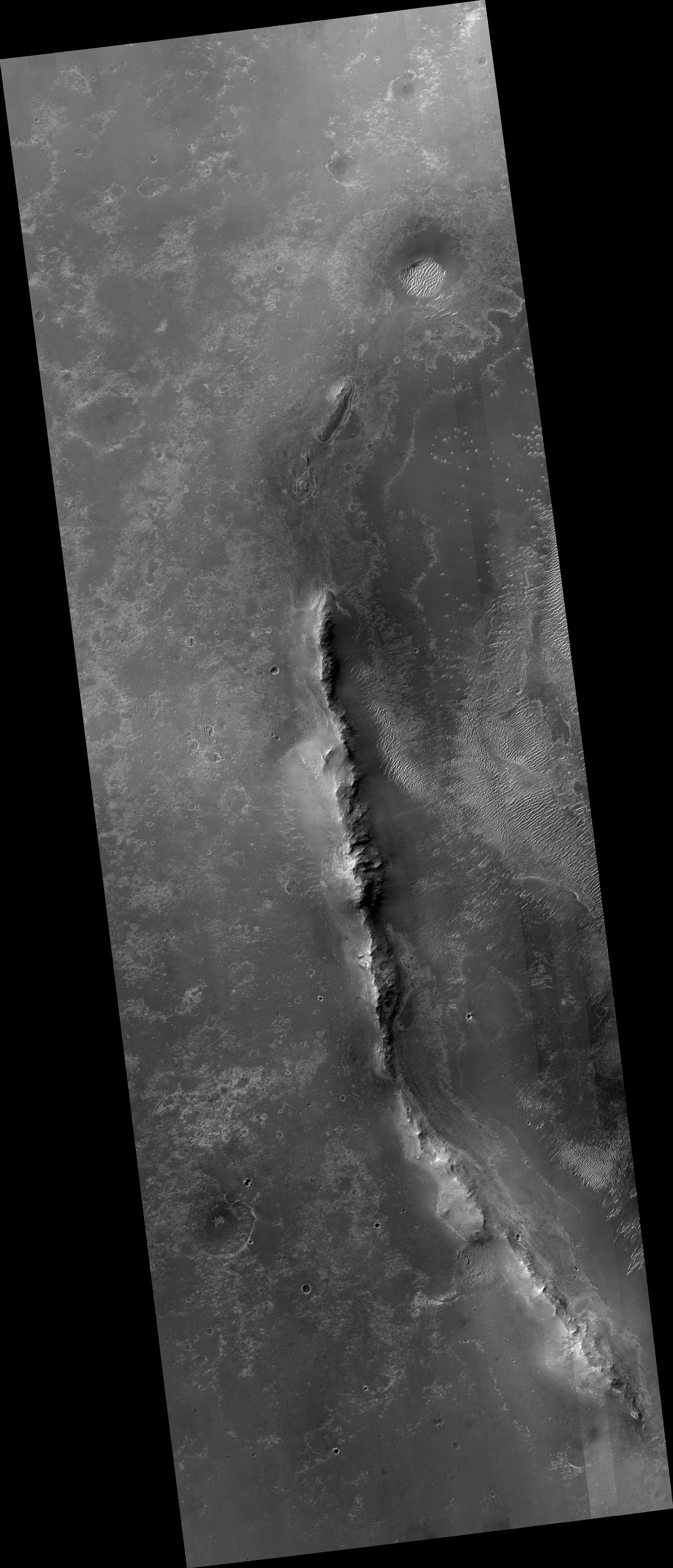
MRO Context camera image of the Western rim of Endeavour

=== Western rim sections from Solander to Marathon ===
==== 3492 (November 2013) ====
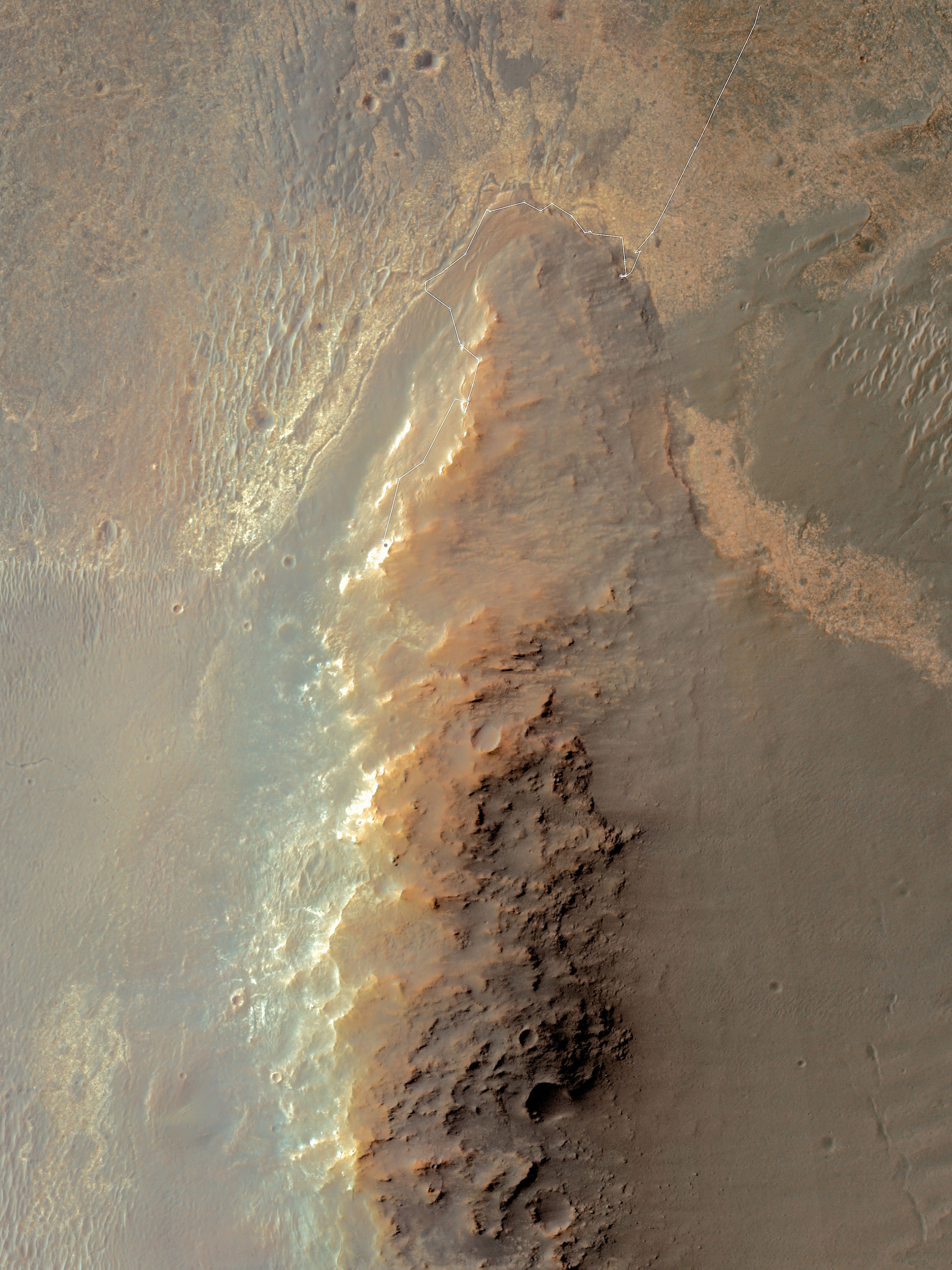
Traverse as of November 2013, to Sol 3492

==== 3500 to 3689 (June 2014) ====
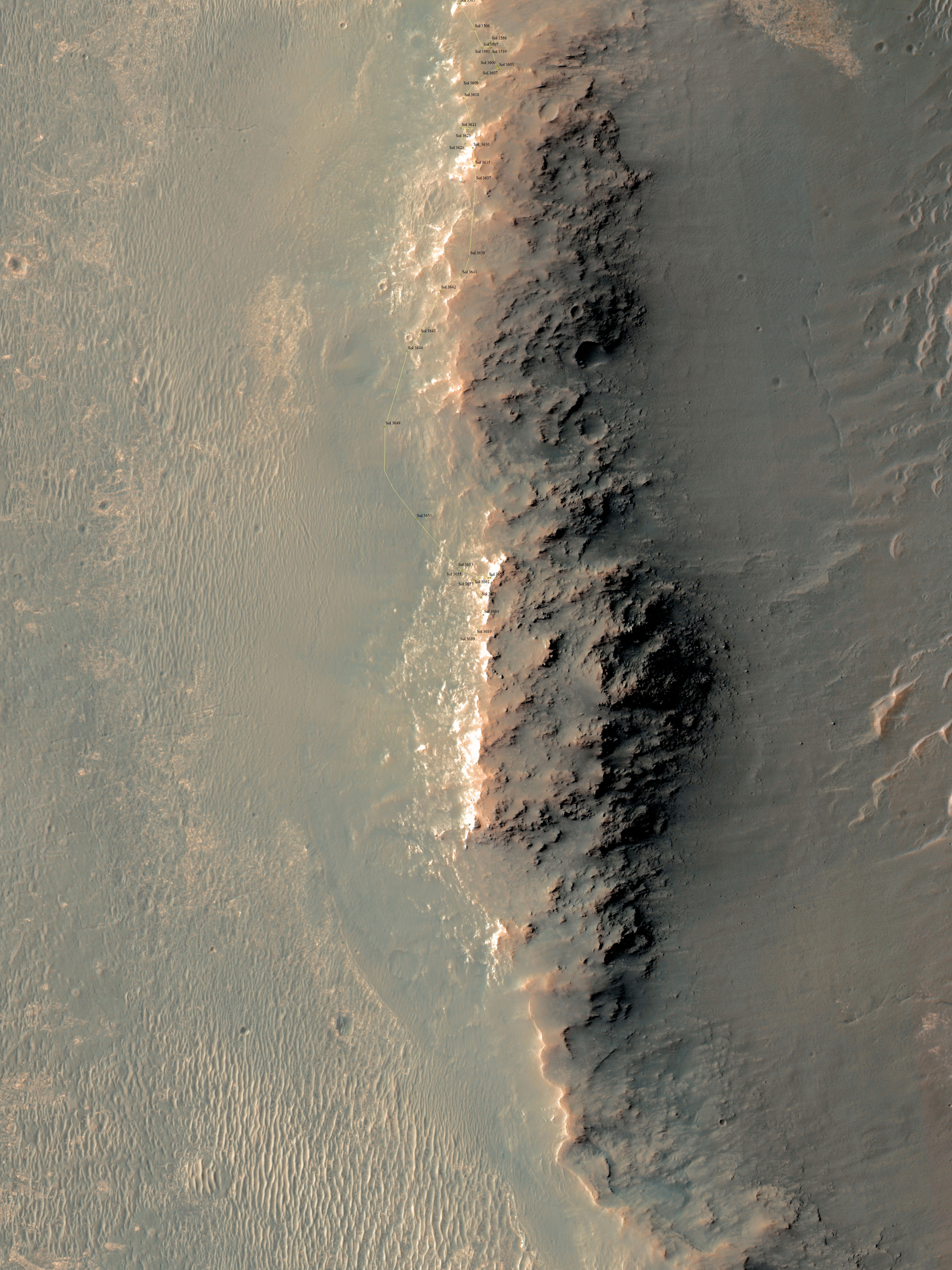
Traverse as of June 2014 from roughly sol 3500 to 3689

==== 3728 to 3757 (August 2014) ====
Roughly in the center is Ulysses crater, visited by MER-B around Sol 3790 (September 2014)

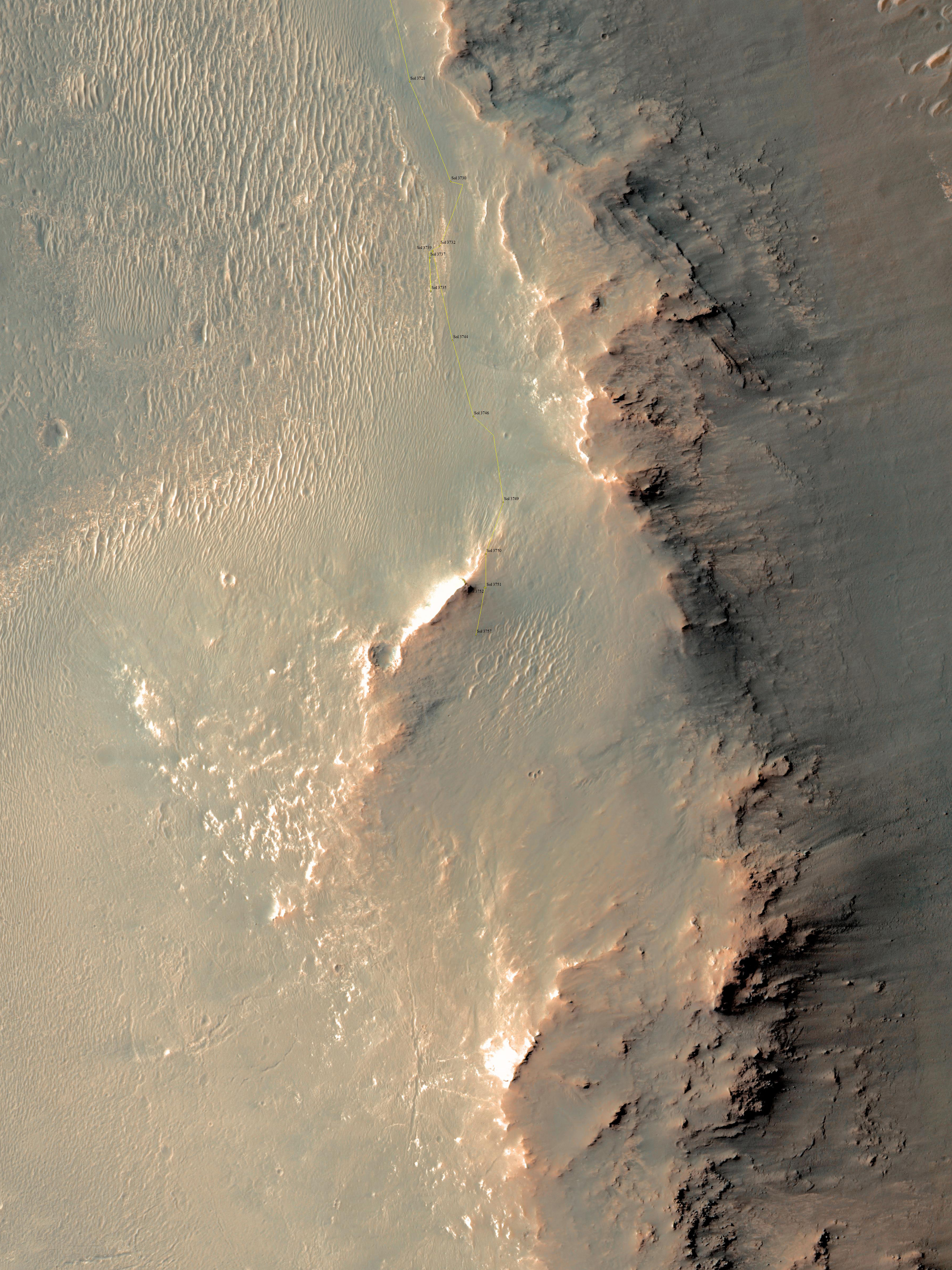
Traverse as of August 2014 from roughly sol 3728 to 3757

==== 3750 to 3869 (December 2014) ====
Ulysses crater is roughly top-center location, visited by MER-B around Sol 3790 (September 2014)

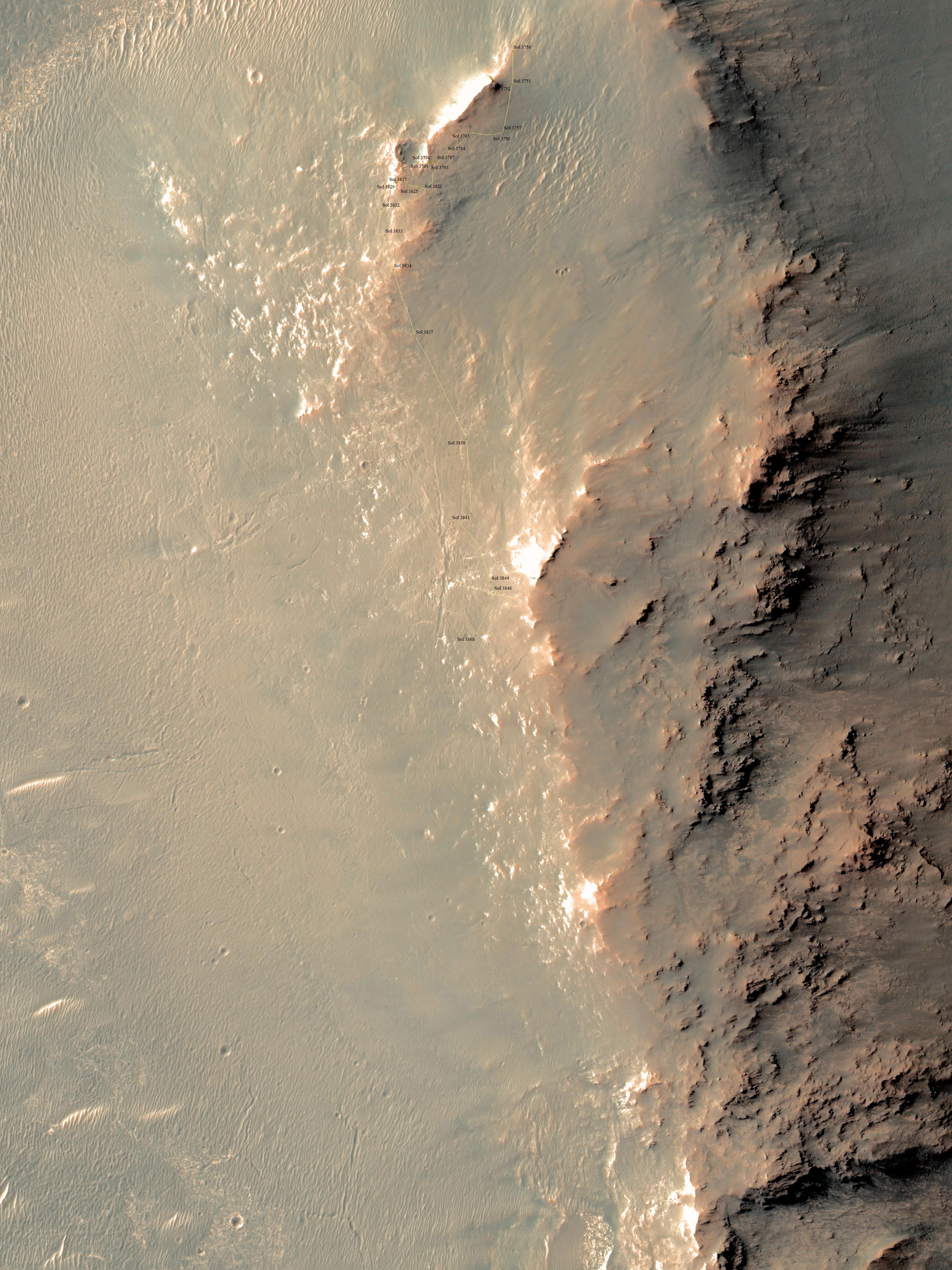
Traverse as of December 2014 from roughly sol 3750 to 3868

==== 3870 to 4209 (December 2015) ====
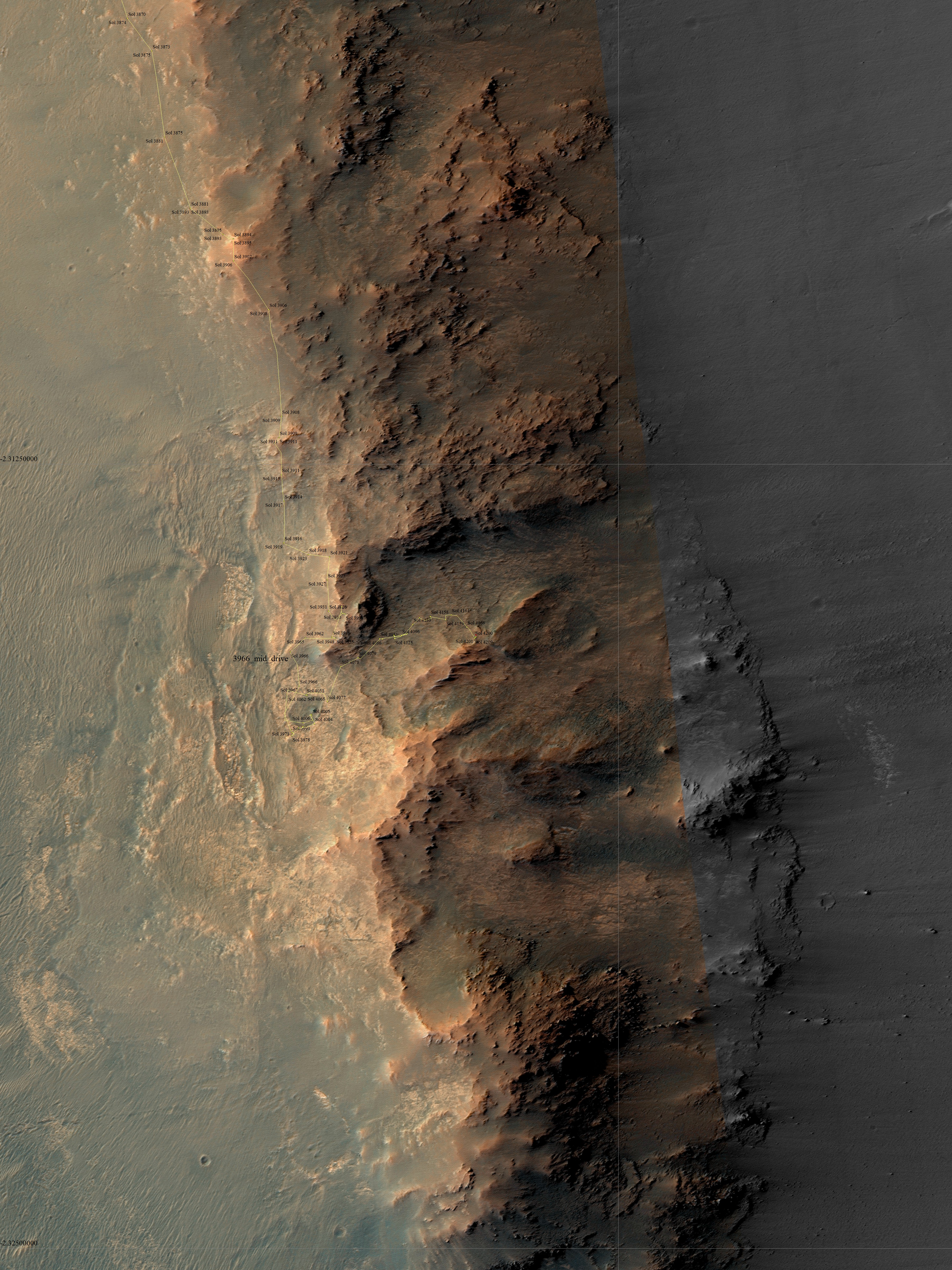
Traverse as of December 2015 from roughly sol 3870 to 4227

==== October 2016 (with labels) ====
Explored in by the MER-B rover, several locations including the crater Spirit of St. Louis with Lindberg Mound, Marathon Valley, Lewis and Clark pass, and Spirit mound among other features on or very near the Western rim

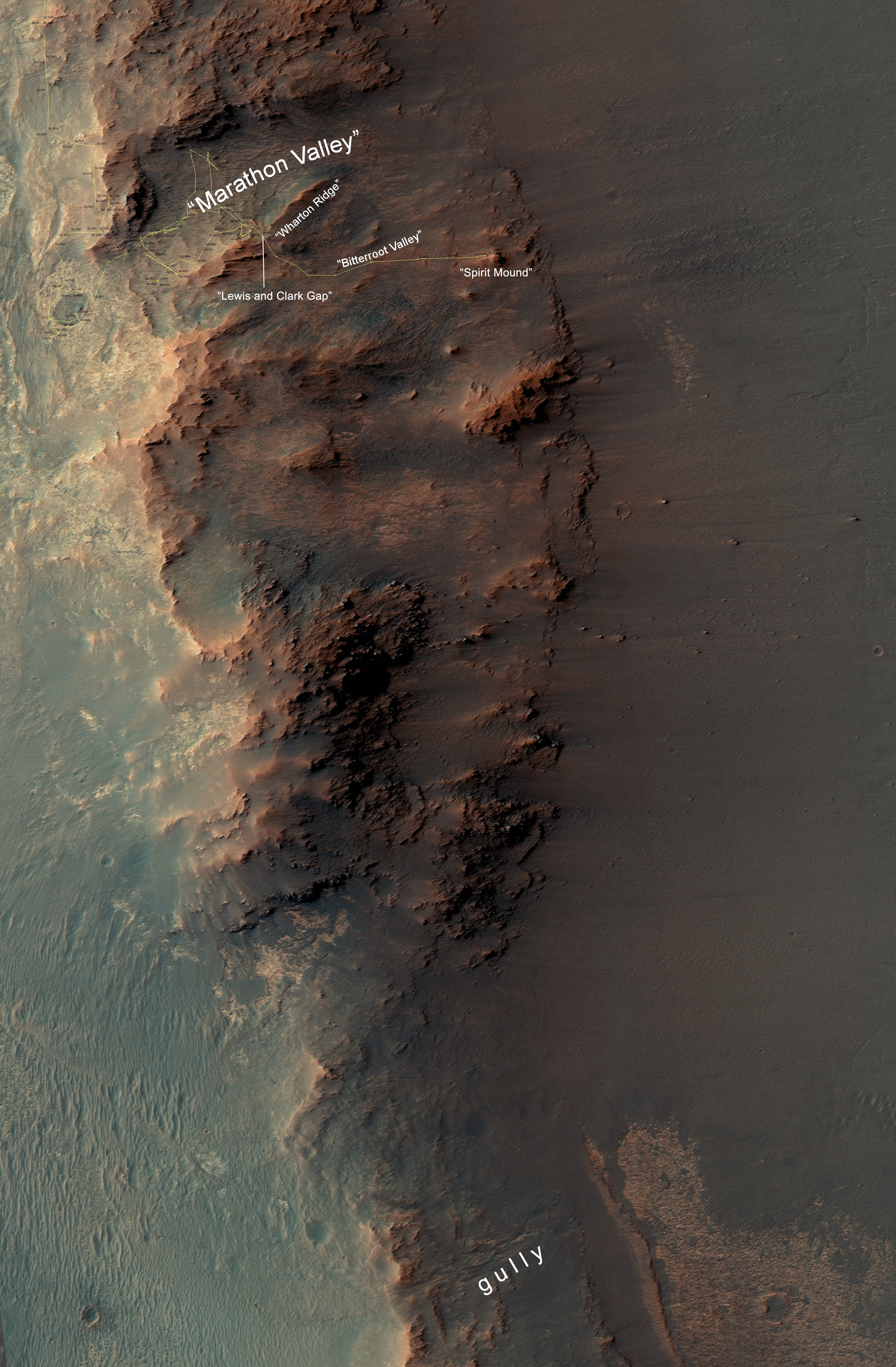
Traverse map to October 2016 (annotated version)

==== to 4625 (January 2017) ====
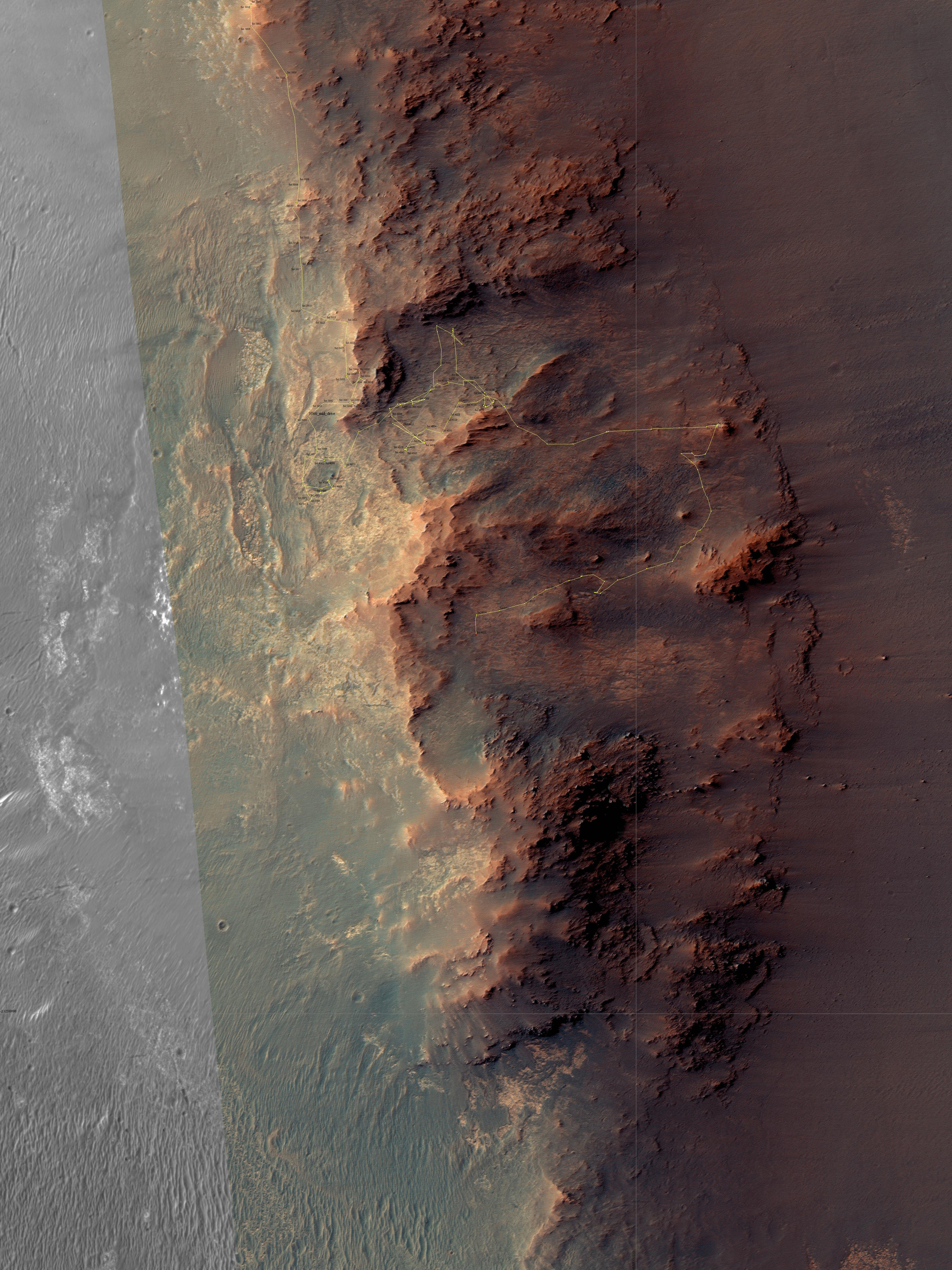
Traverse map to January 27, 2017 (Sol 4625)

==== to 4695 (April 2017) ====
Cape Tribulation and Cape Bryon

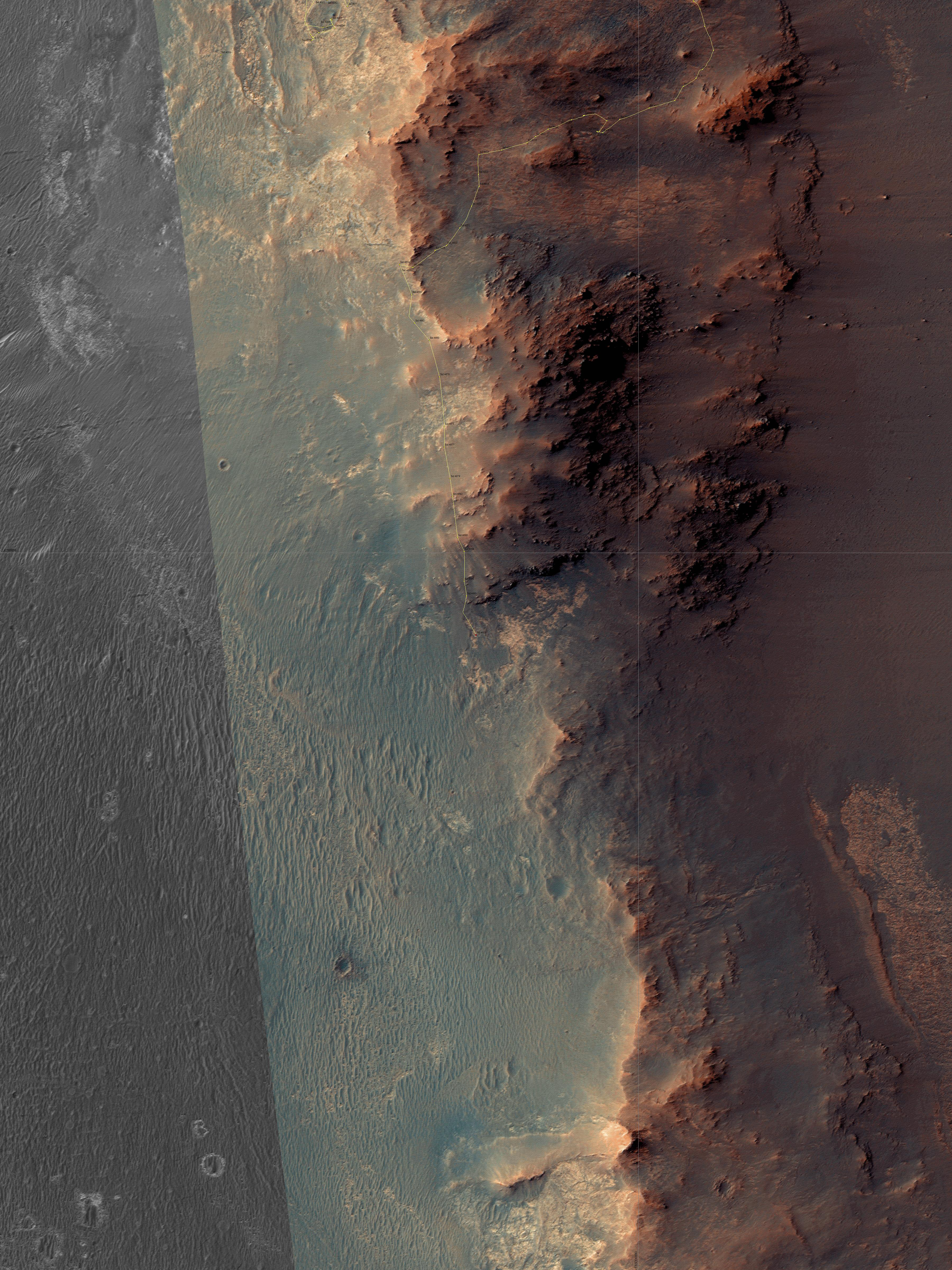
Traverse map to April 11, 2017 (Sol 4695)

==== Up to 4836 (September 2017) ====
Throughout 2017, Opportunity worked its way south along the Western rim as it moved towards the gully, which the team named Perseverance Valley in April 2017.

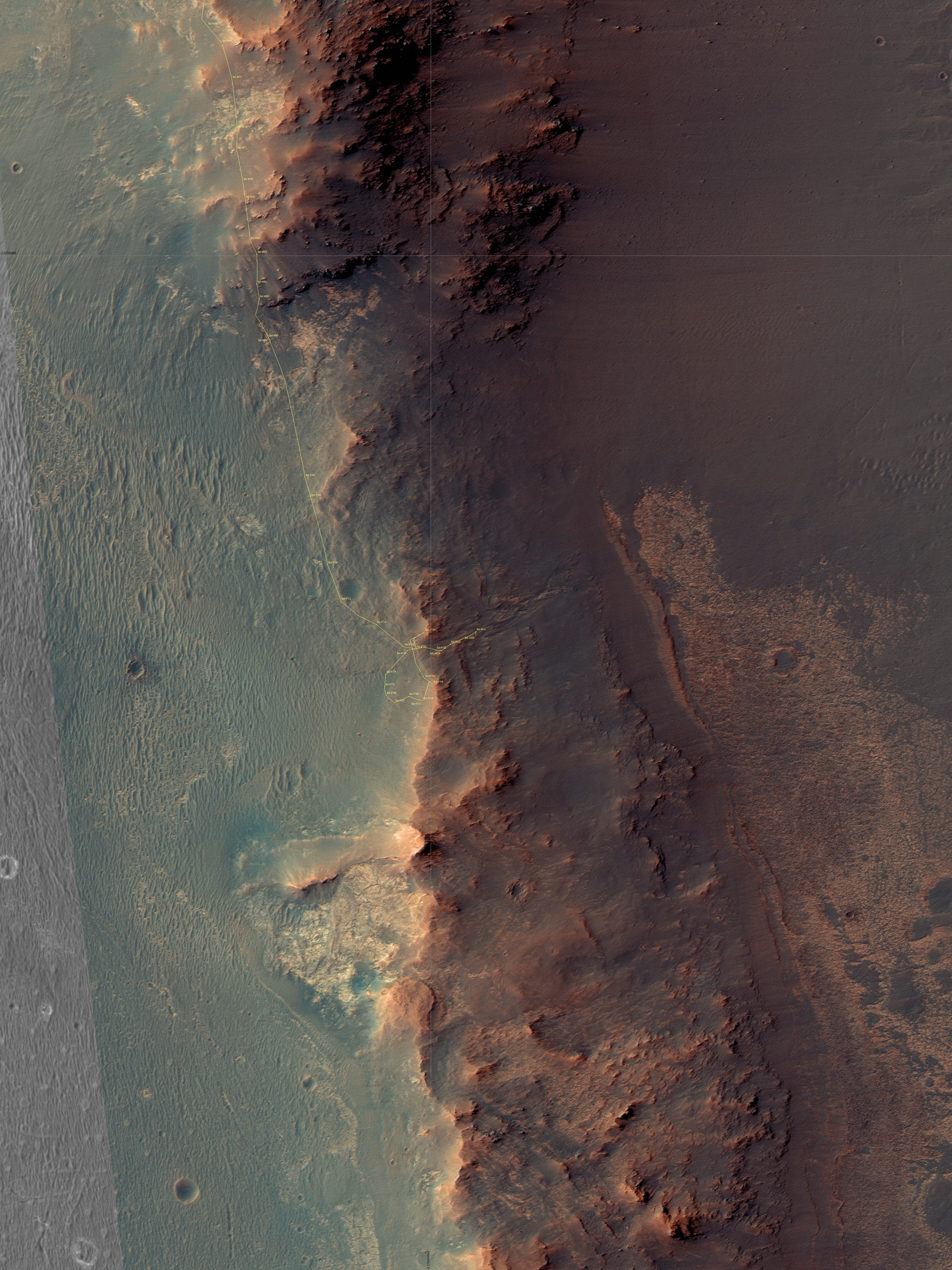
Traverse map up to 4836 (September 12, 2017)

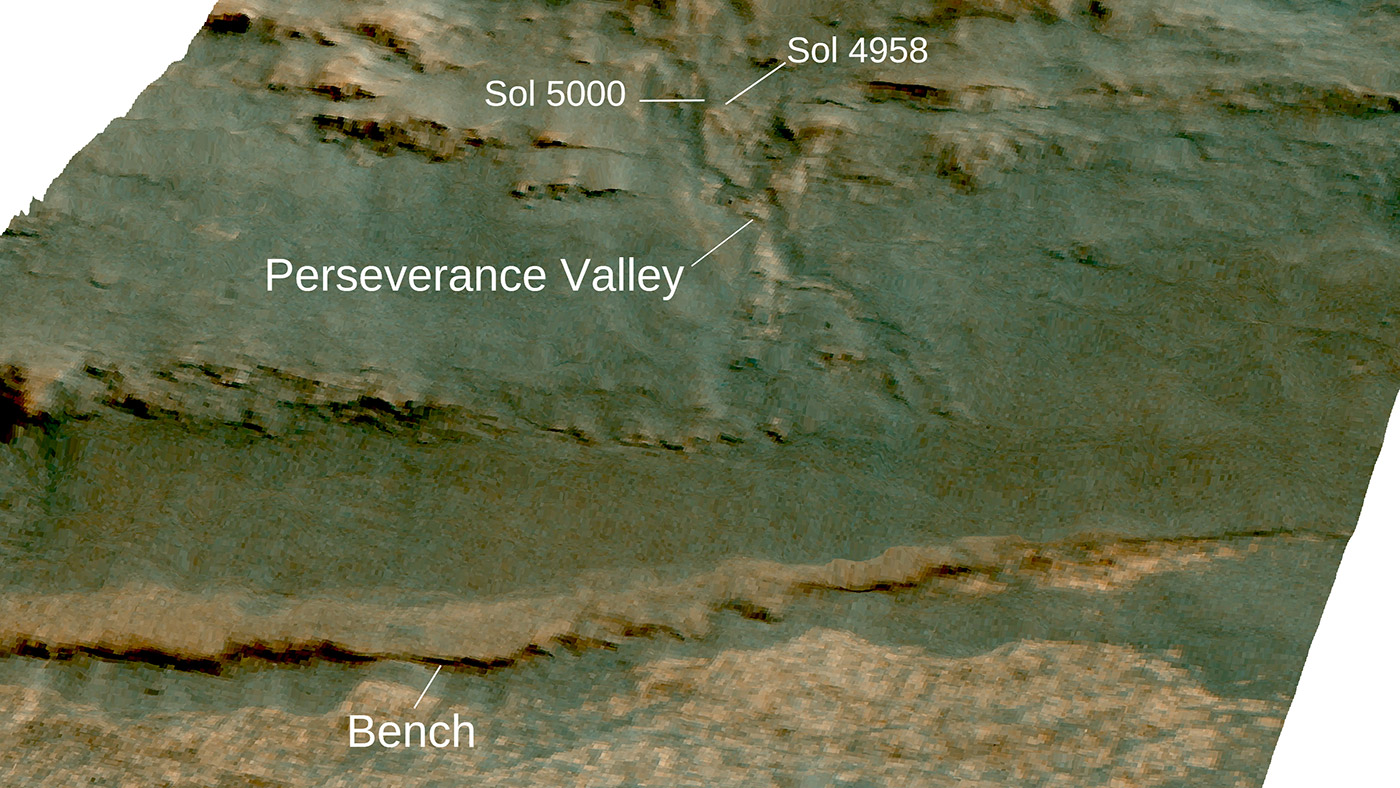
HiRise image from MRO, was laid over 3-D topographic map of the terrain, with 5-fold vertical exaggeration; view looking west on to Perseverance Valley on the western rim of Endeavour (February 15, 2018)

== Eastern rim ==
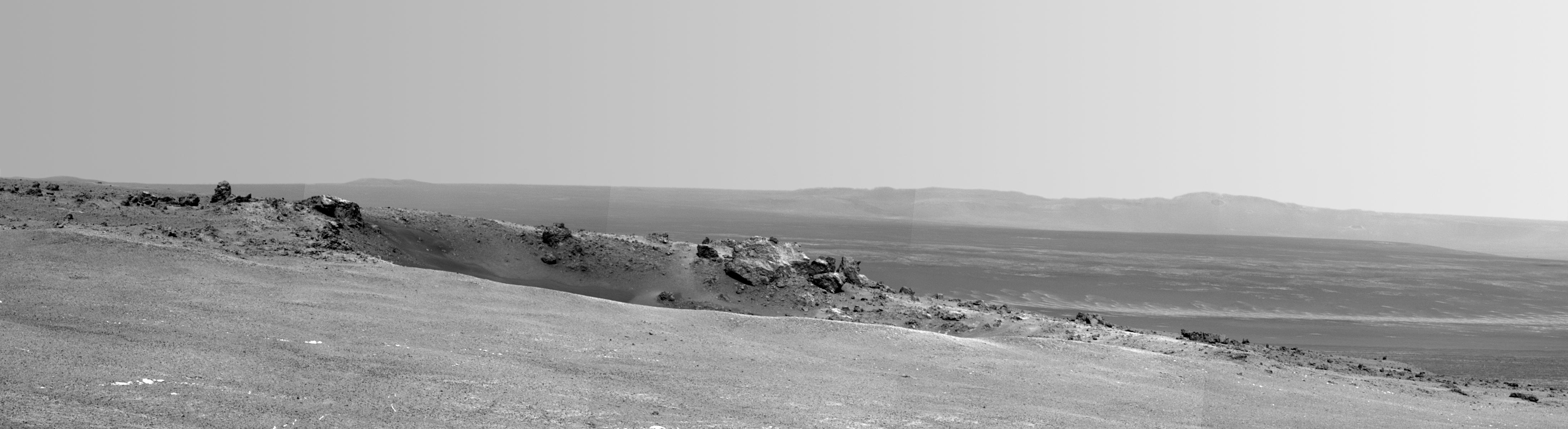
Arrival at Spirit Point at Endeavour, in the distance is the crater floor and on the other side the eastern rim segments

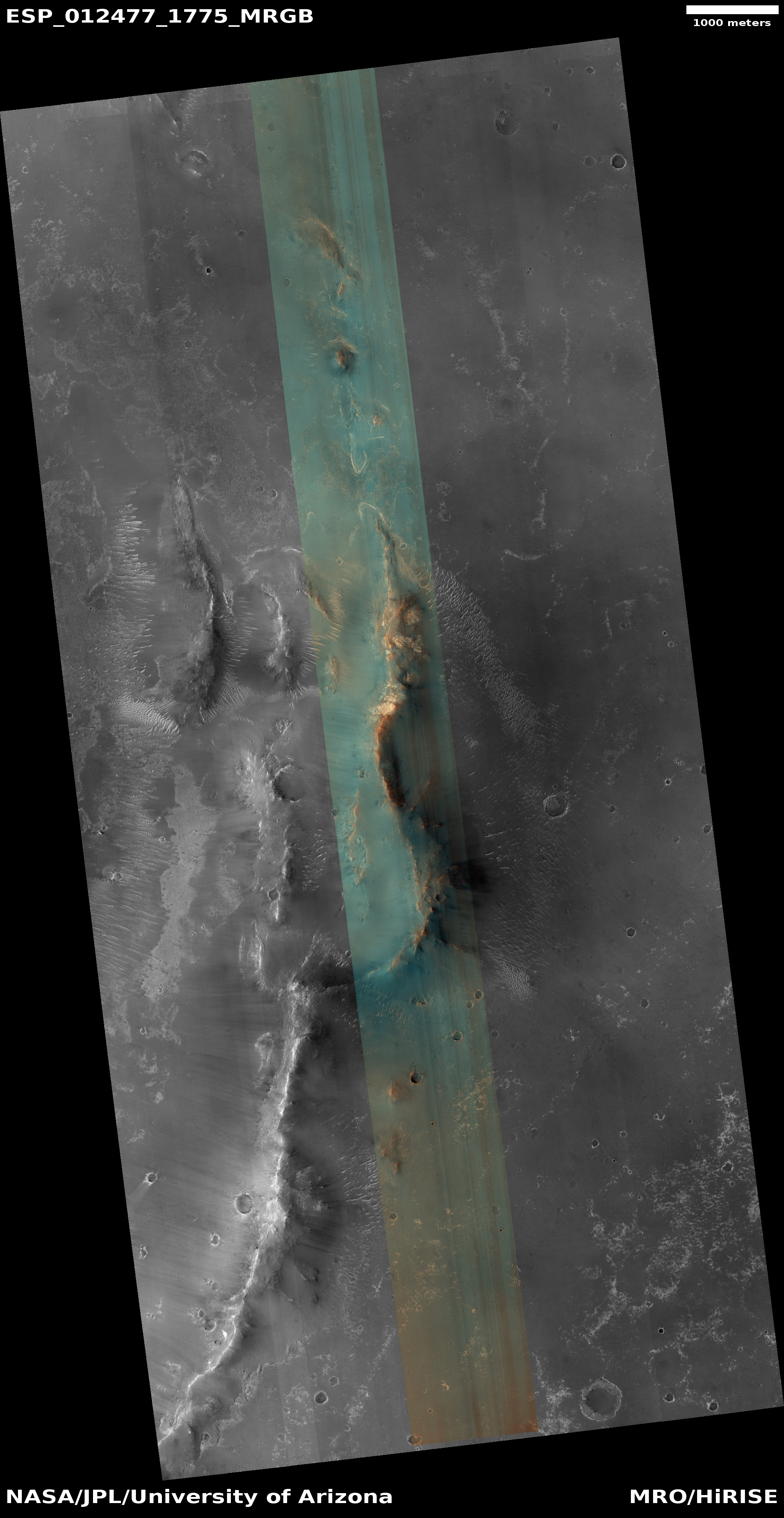
Eastern rim of Endeavour, the B&W swath is about 5 km across and the color swath 1 km

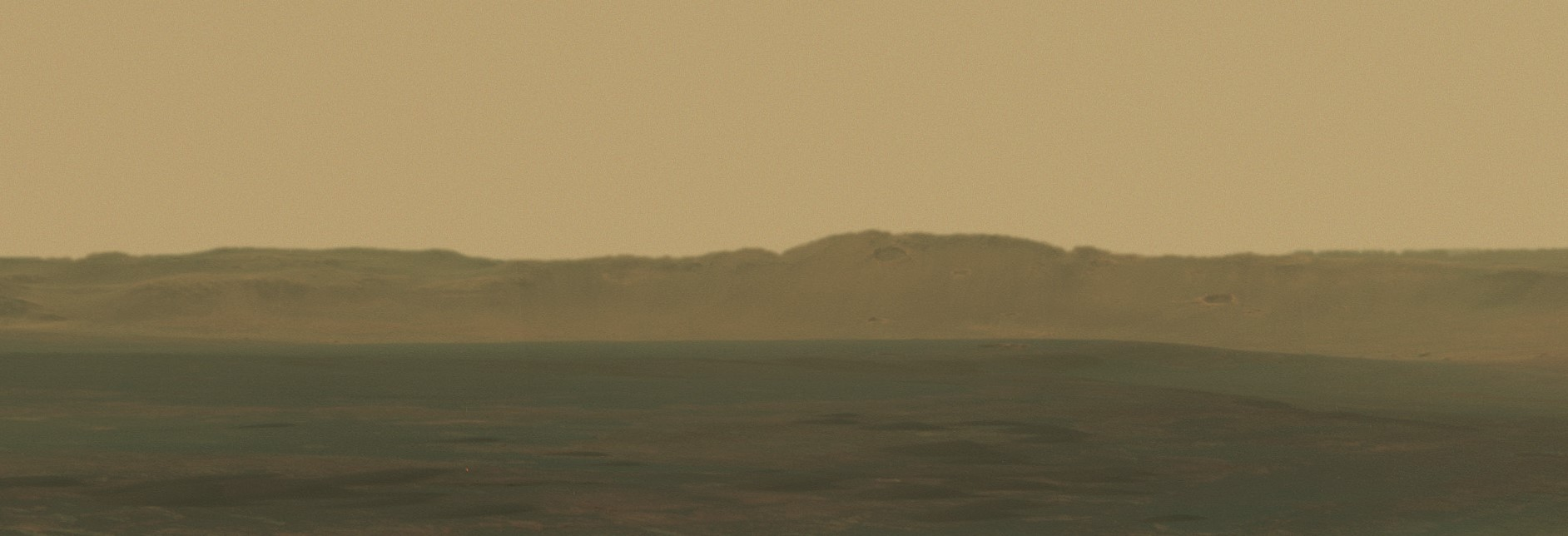
Part of the Eastern rim as seen by MER-B

== Opportunity ==
MER-B has had such new discoveries at the crater, that the rover team compared Endeavour to the equivalent of a second landing site for Opportunity. For example, On sol 2692 (August 22, 2011) the rover began examining Tisdale 2, a large ejecta block. "This is different from any rock ever seen on Mars," said Steve Squyres, principal investigator for Opportunity at Cornell University in Ithaca, New York.

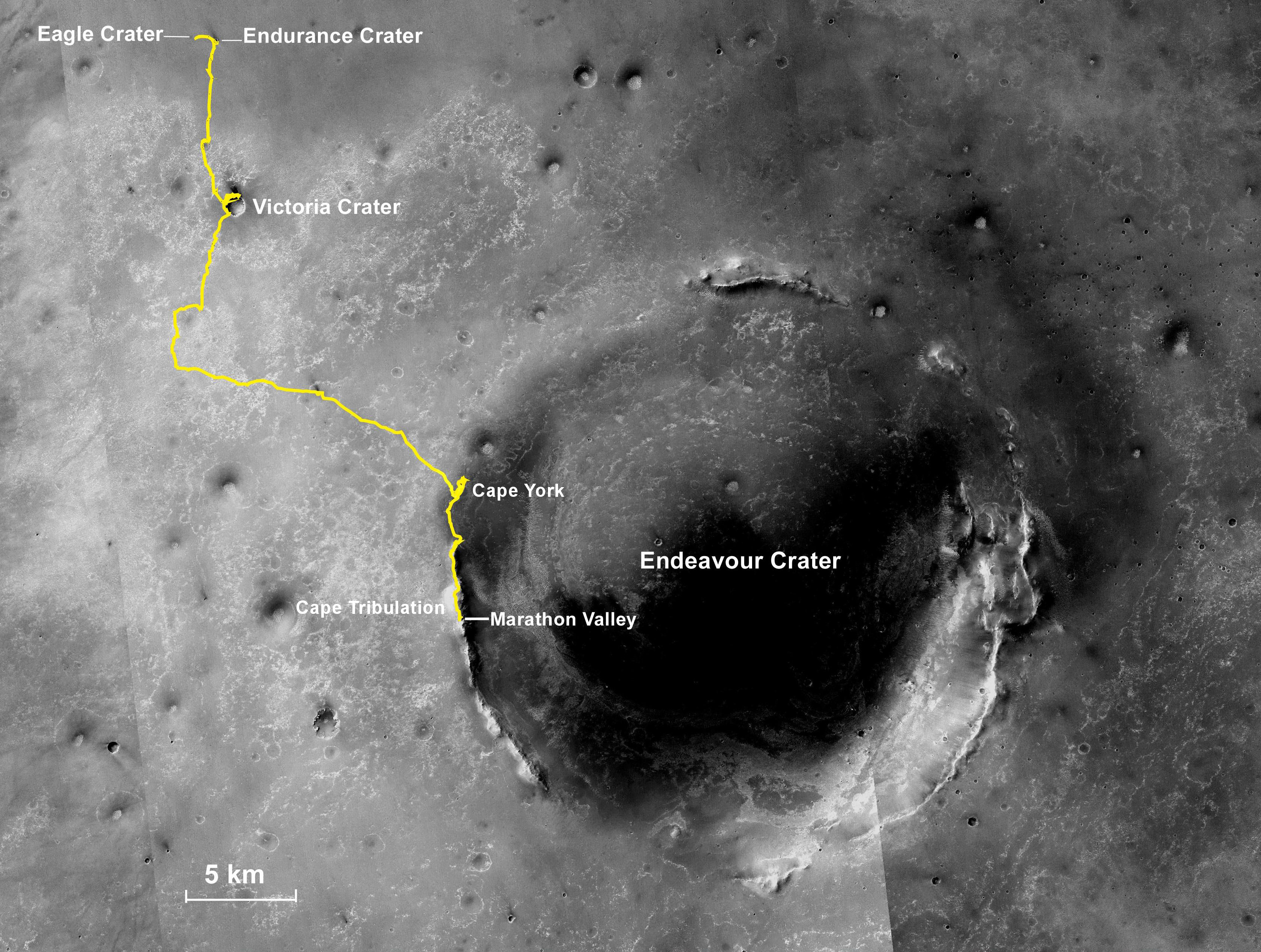
Opportunity's traverse up to March 2015 from its landing site to Endeavour. It has traversed south along the Western rim and orbiting spacecraft have help collect data on the rim, which in turn allows the rover to more closely investigate

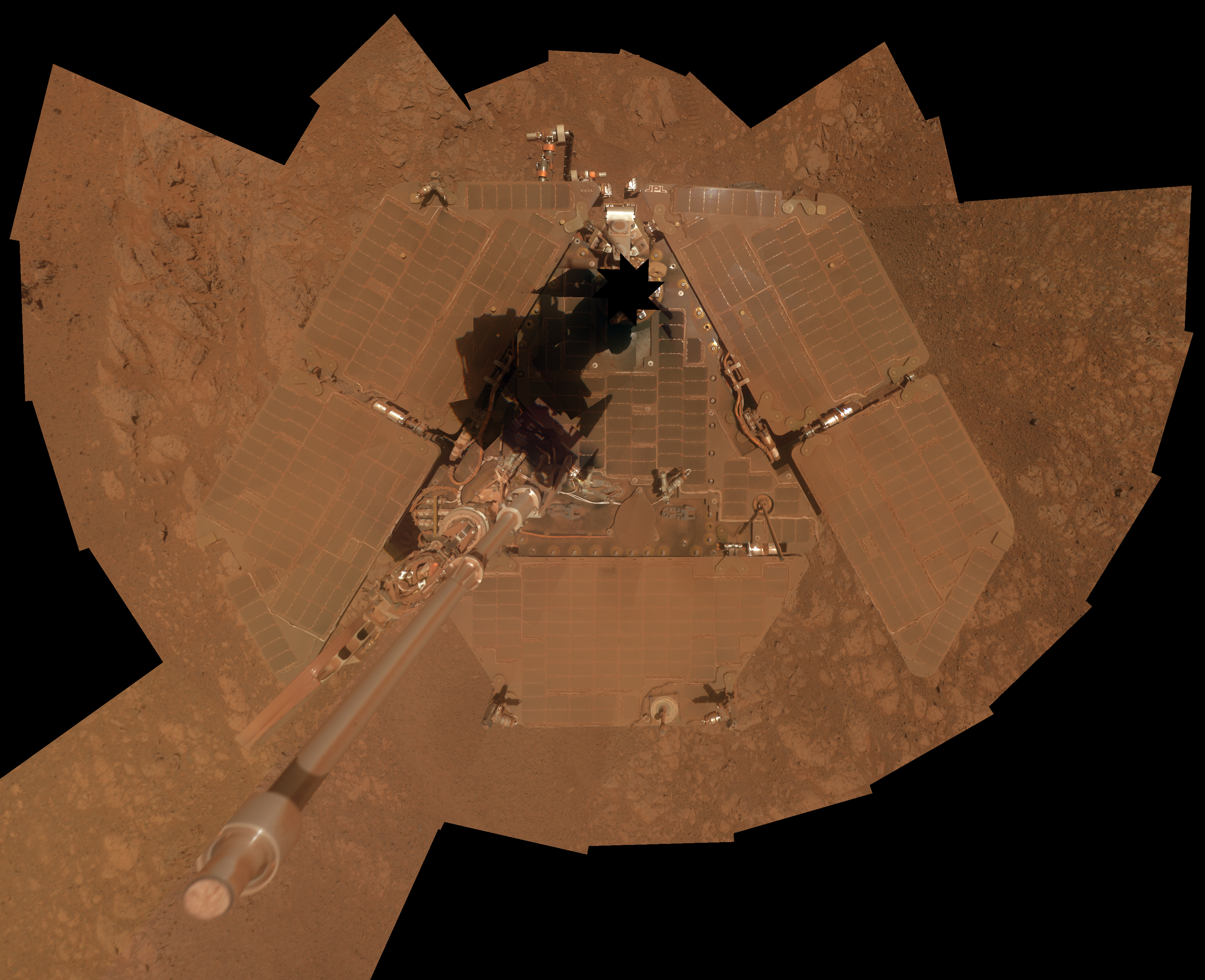
Self-portrait of Opportunity near Endeavour on the surface of Mars (January 6, 2014).

=== The journey to Endeavour ===
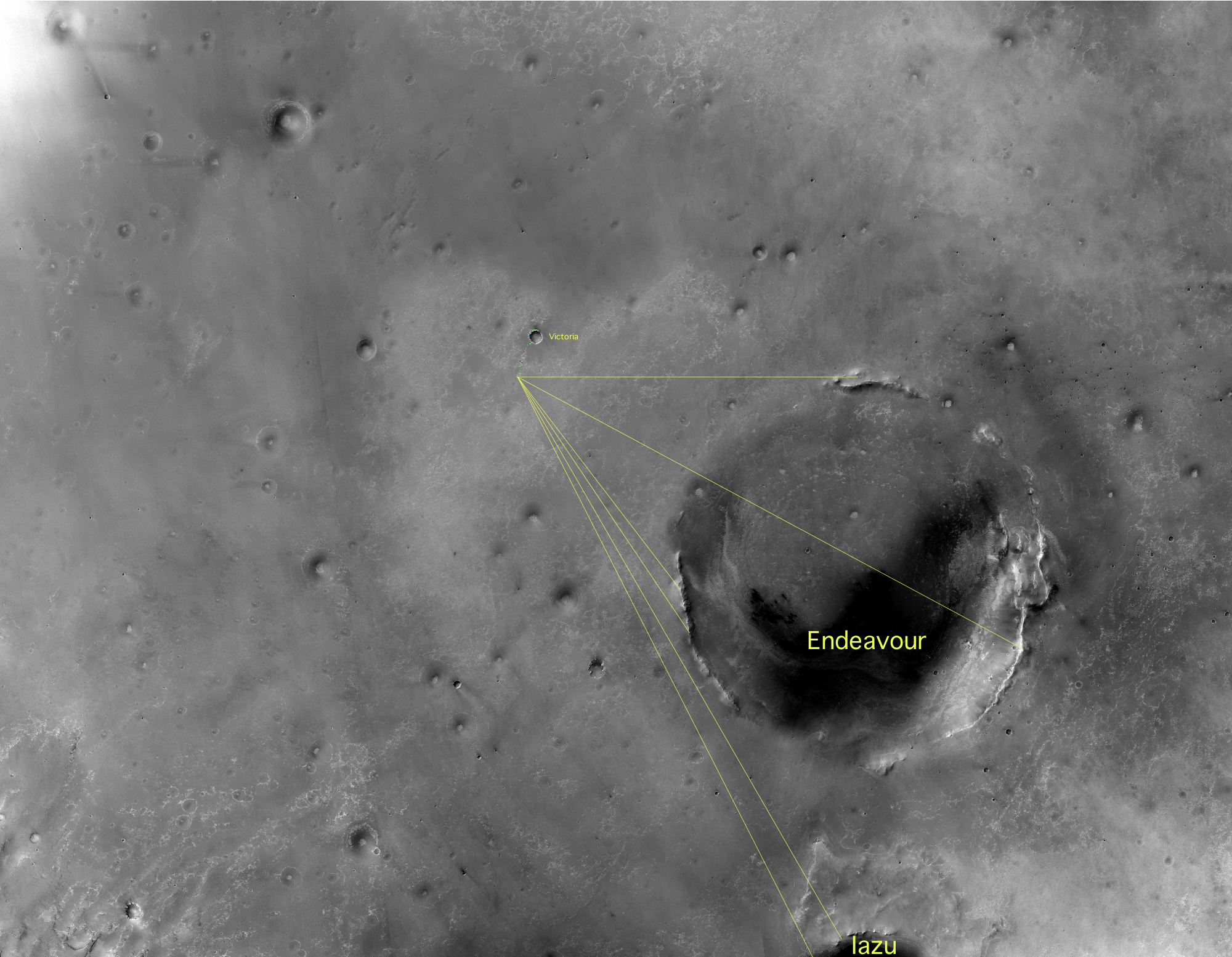
Annotated image showing the May 2009 position of Opportunity and names for the craters Iazu, Endeavour, and Victoria

In August 2008, Mars Exploration Rover-B Opportunity set to reach Endeavour and began a journey towards it. Some craters that were previously explored by Opportunity include the crater Victoria which is 750 meters (0.47 miles) in diameter, Endurance crater which is 130 meters (0.081 miles) in diameter, and the crater Eagle which is 22 meters (0.014 miles) in diameter.

On March 7, 2009 (sol 1,820), Opportunity first imaged the rim of Endeavour after driving about 3.2 kilometers (2.0 mi) since it left Victoria in August 2008. Opportunity also imaged the crater Iazu, which is about 38 kilometers (24 mi) away and about 7 kilometers (4.3 mi) in diameter. At that time, Opportunity was 12 kilometers (7.5 mi) from Endeavour as the Martian crow flies, but to avoid hazards, it was estimated that it would take about 30% more driving distance than that to reach Endeavour. Based on the amount of time it had taken to drive from Victoria, it was estimated that this journey would take over one Martian year (23 months). On May 5, 2010, to avoid hazardous dune fields along the direct path between Victoria and Endeavour, the charted route between the two craters was extended to an estimated 19 kilometers.

On September 8, 2010, it was announced that Opportunity had reached the halfway point of the 19-kilometer journey between Victoria and Endeavour. By June 28, 2011, Opportunity was just under 2 kilometers (1.2 mi) from landfall at the rim of Endeavour.

On August 4, 2011, Opportunity was only 120 meters (390 ft) from the rim of Endeavour, and on August 9, 2011 Opportunity arrived at the west rim near Spirit Point to study outcrops never seen before.

When it arrived it explored the northwest outcrops at Cape York (Mars) of the crater before heading south to Solander Point and the Western rim.

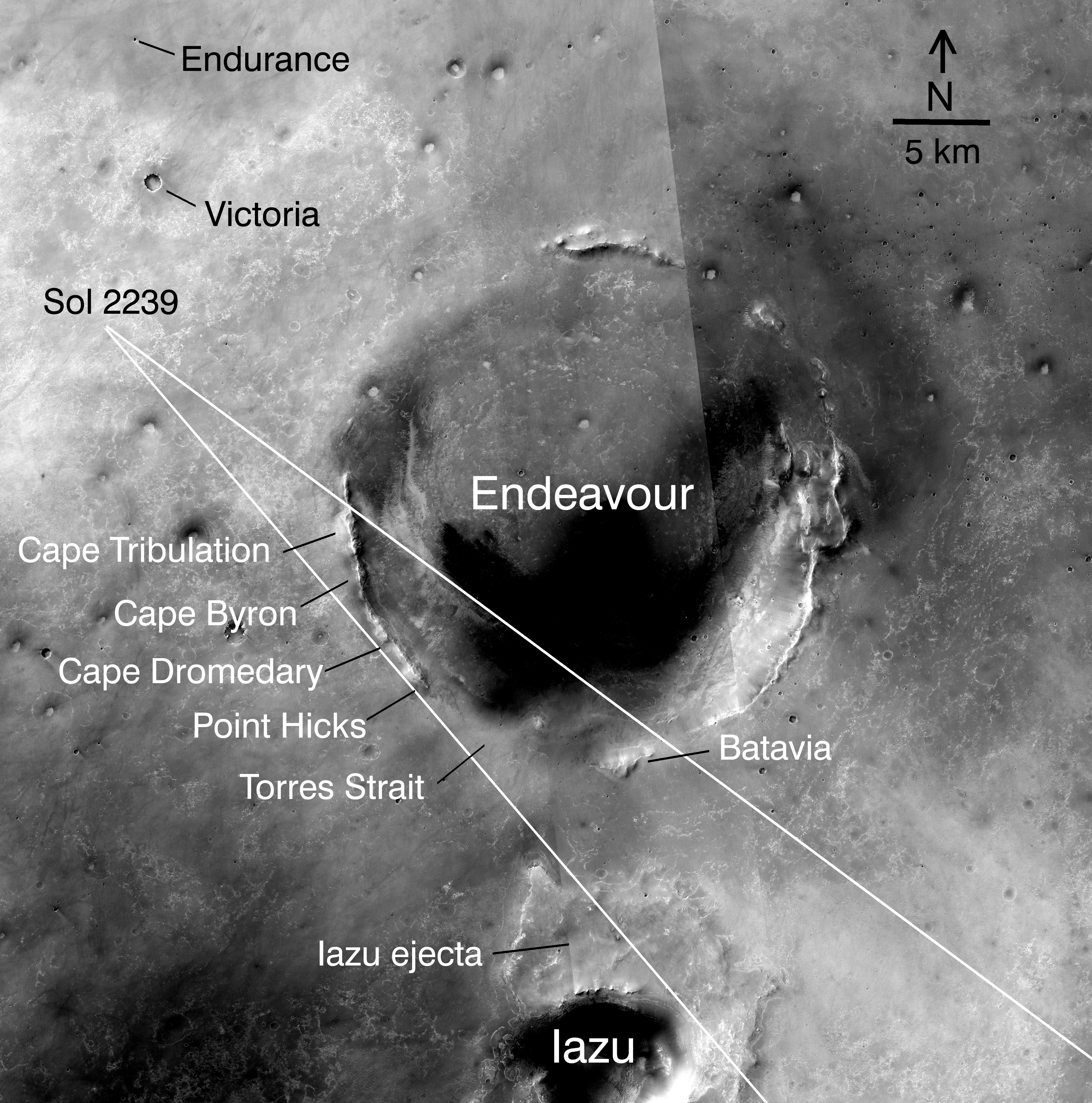
MER-B on Sol 2239 imaged the then distant crater rim. On this map several locations of Endeavour are identified including: Cape Tribulation, Cape Bryon, Cape Dromedary, Point Hicks, Torres Strait, and Batavia. Further south the nearby crater Iazu is also marked.

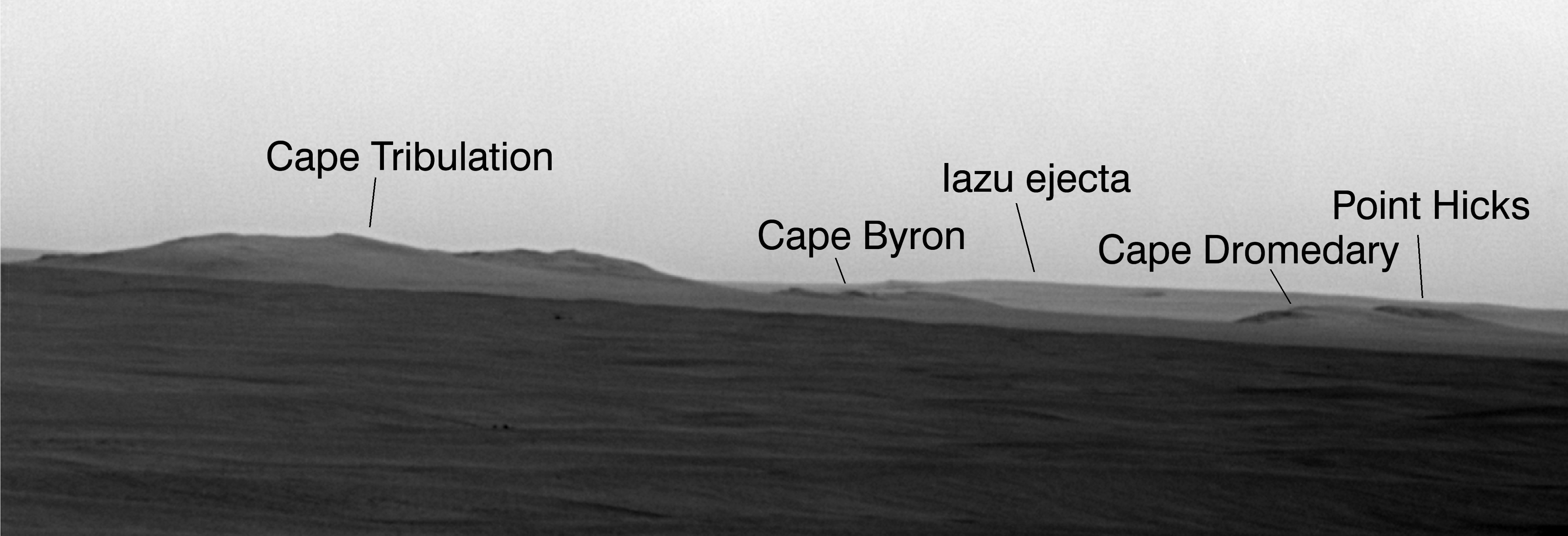
Here is the view from the rover's perspective from that location noted in the above top-down view. The white lines indicate the rover's field of view

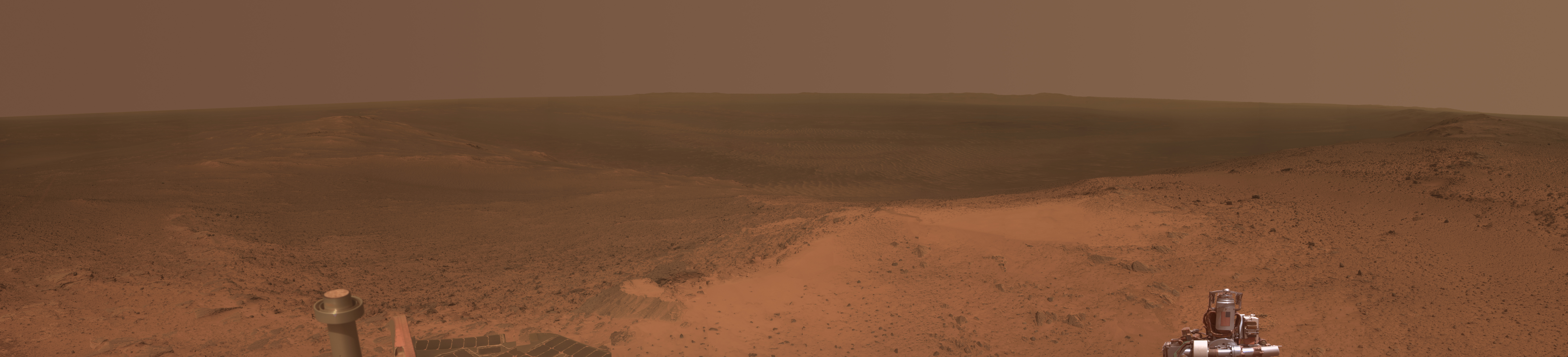
MER-B eventually reached Cape Tribulation, and took a panorama from its top: Opportunity's view from Cape Tribulation on the rim of Endeavour, January 22, 2015.

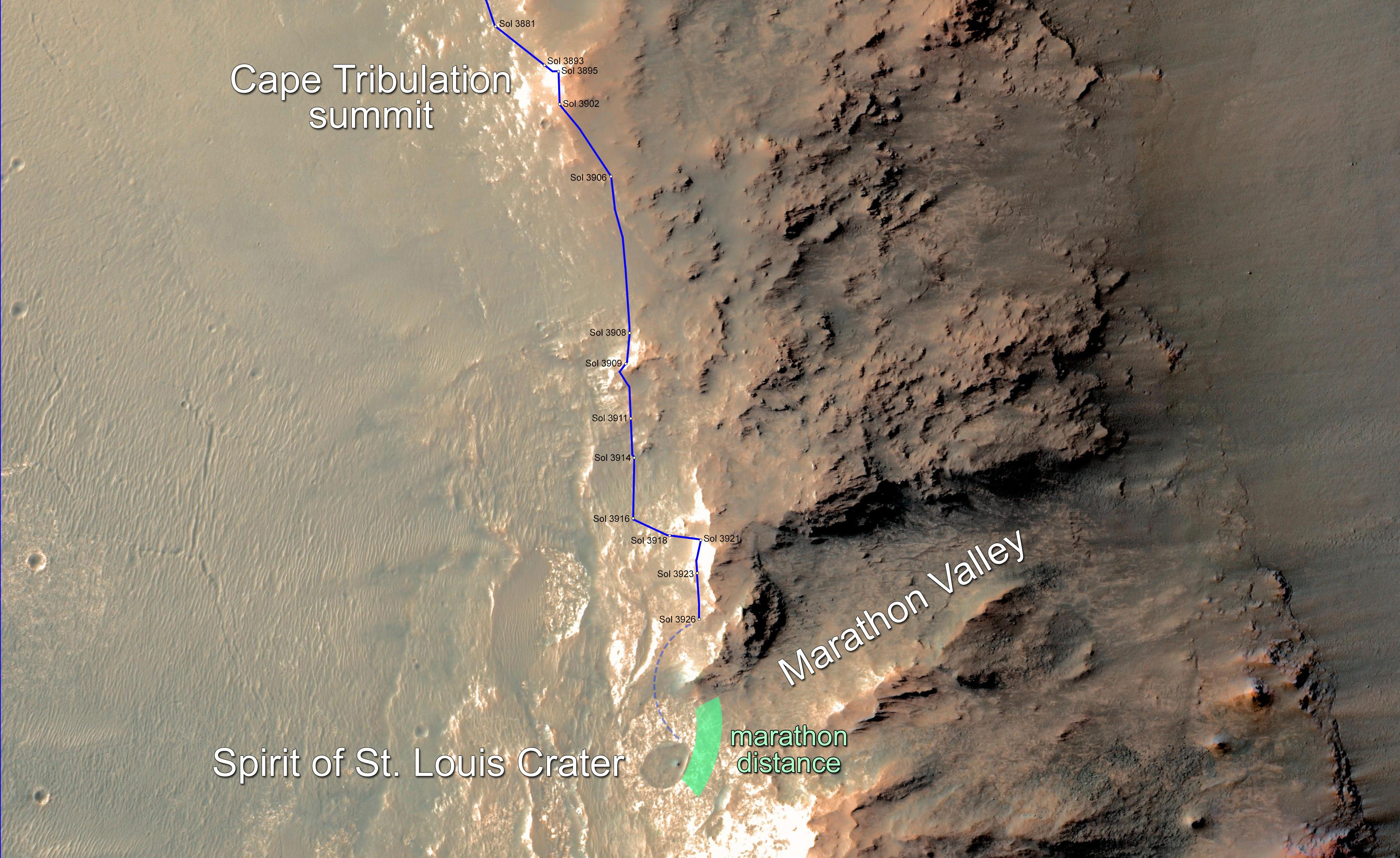
Opportunity's traverse up to February 2015 as it approached Spirit of St. Louis Crater and Marathon Valley, and came close to traveling the distance of a traditional marathon (about 26 miles or 42 km)

== Solander point ==
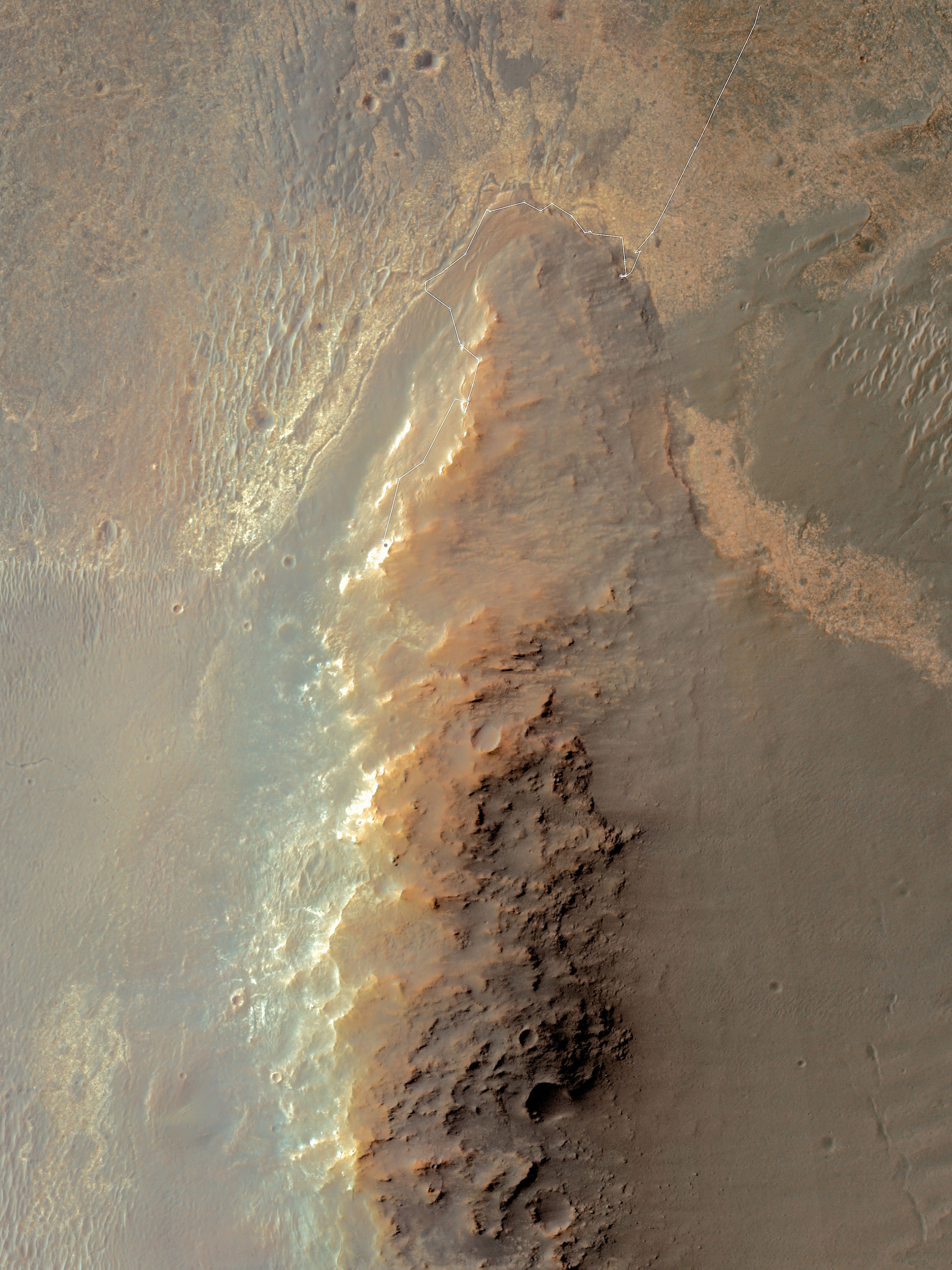
Solander Point

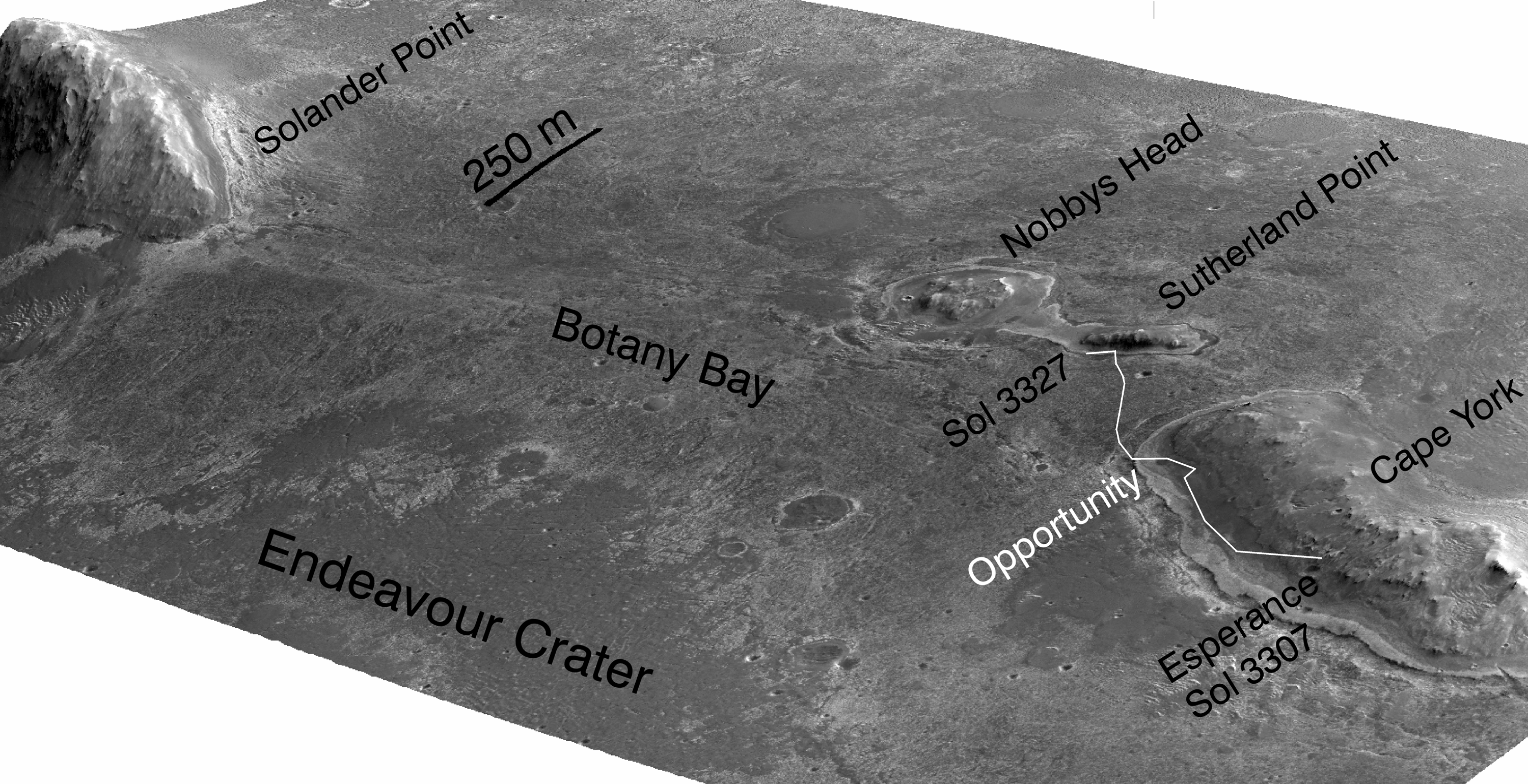
Looking west in this topographic view overlaid photo, Solander is to the left, then moving right Botany Bay, and Cape York

=== Homestake Vein ===
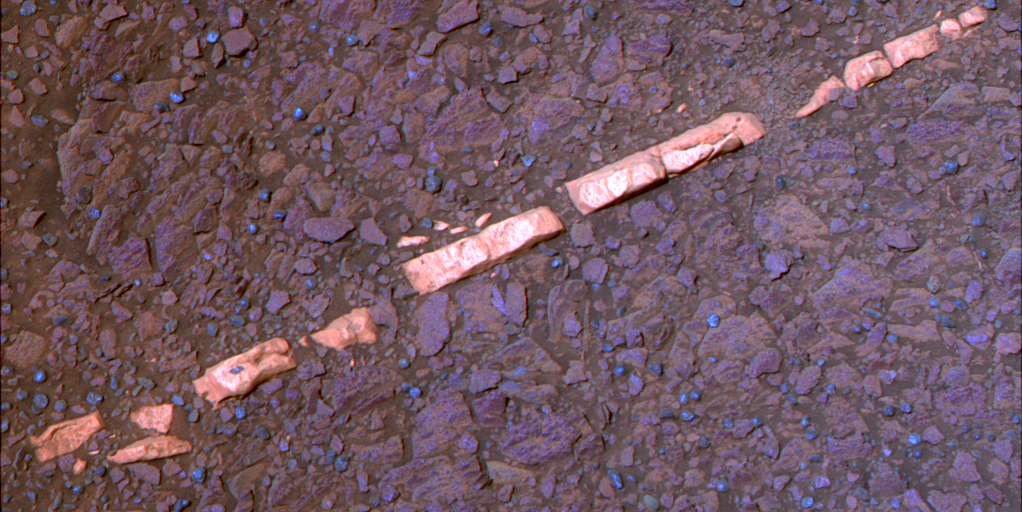
"Homestake" vein

In December 2011, Opportunity rover discovered a vein of gypsum sticking out of the soil along the rim of Endeavour. Tests confirmed that it contained calcium, sulfur, and water. The mineral gypsum is the best match for the data. It likely formed from mineral-rich water moving through a crack in the rock. The vein is called "Homestake." It could have been produced in conditions more neutral than the harshly acidic conditions indicated by the other sulfate deposits; hence this environment may have been more hospitable for a large variety of living organisms. Homestake is in a zone where the sulfate-rich sedimentary bedrock of the plains meets older, volcanic bedrock exposed at the rim of Endeavour.

== Wdowiak Ridge ==
A view looking north-north west with the Western and Northwest Endeavour segments

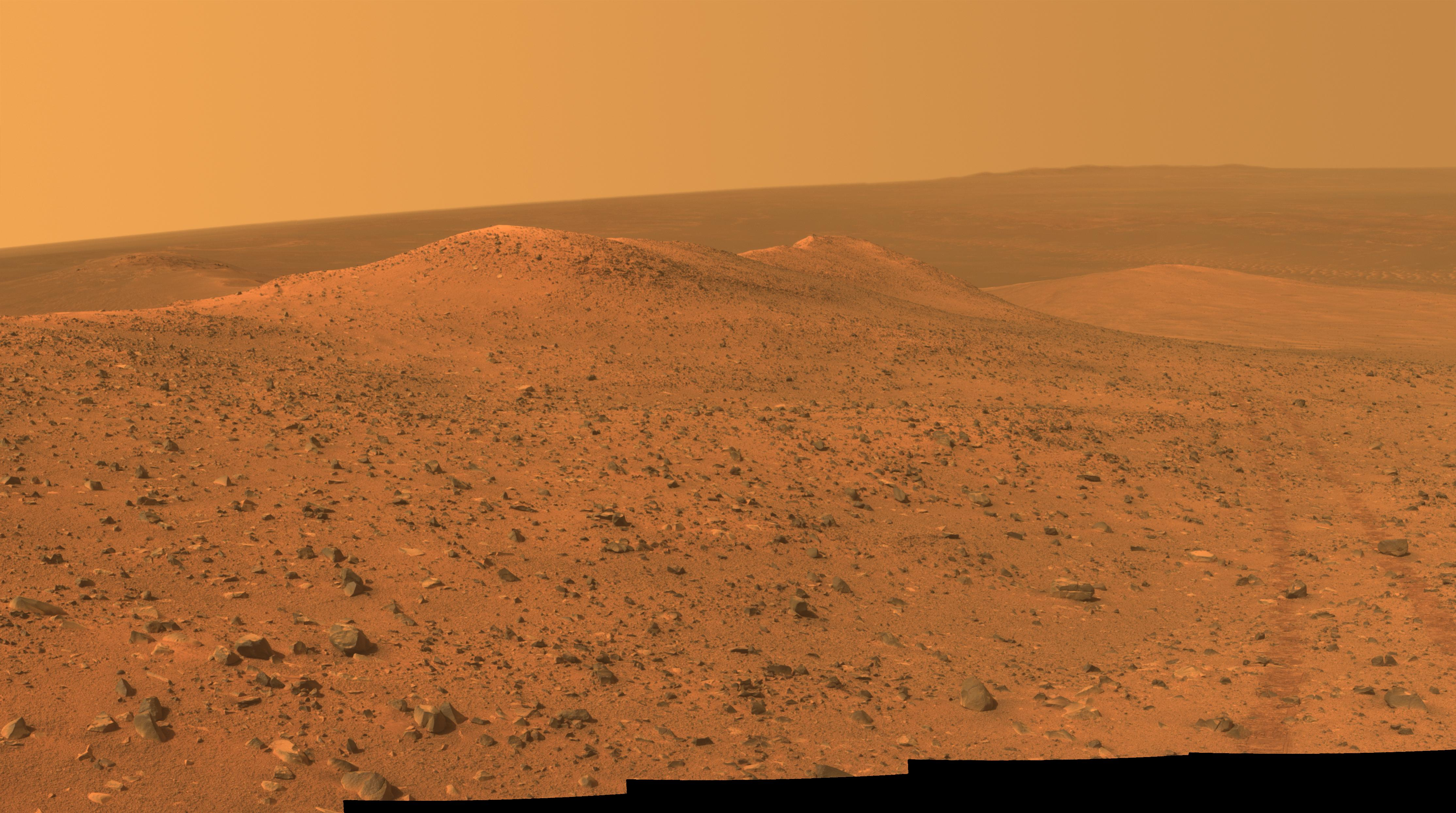
Wdowiak Ridge on the North-Western rim of Endeavour. MER-B recorded this panorama on Sept. 17, 2014 (Sol 3,786)

== Proximity to Schiaparelli landing ellipse ==
In October 2016 ESA's Schiaparelli lander attempted to re-use the proven Meridiani Planum landing site, with a landing ellipse that kisses the Endeavour crater location where Opportunity was still functioning. This allowed the opportunity for Opportunity to attempt to image the lander during its descent from the surface of Mars. Contact was lost during descent

MRO Context Camera images of Schiaparelli landing site; before (29 May 2016) and after (20 October 2016). The large black spot indicates the impact by the lander, and the white spot its parachute.

== Proximity to MSL landing site candidates ==
Two of the seven final landing candidates for MSL were relatively near to Endeavour, one was in Miyamoto (crater) and another was south of Endeavour in southerner Meridiani. Gale (crater) won the selection

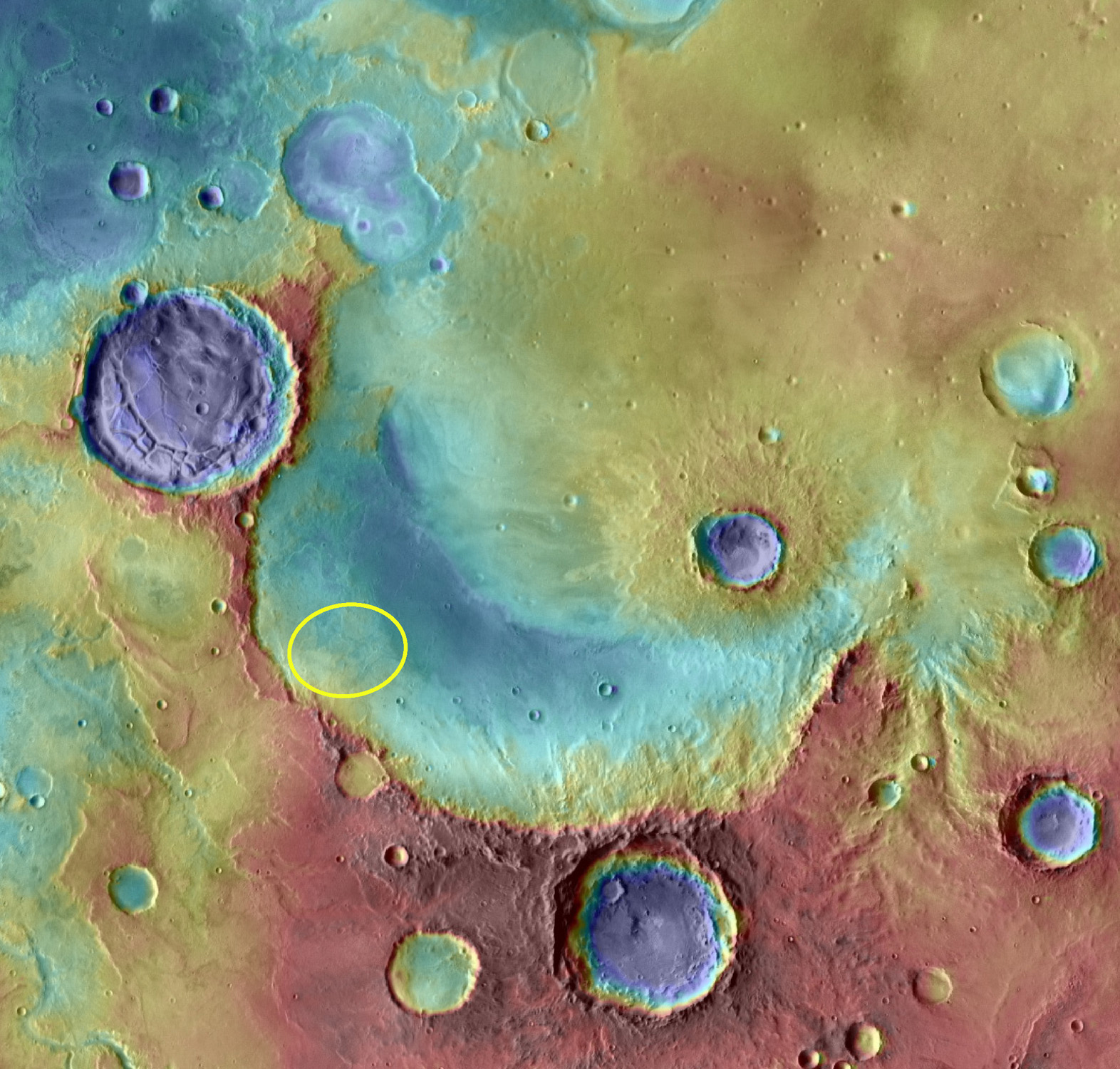
Endeavour can be seen on the right side of this map about halfway down; in the bottom left is the proposed landing ellipse for MSL in the crater Miyamoto.

== Cape Tribulation ==
MER-B from 2011 to 2016 explored the Western rim of Endeavour, starting at Cape York (Mars) then moving down through Botany Bay to Solander Point, along Murray Ridge moving south to Marathon Valley; in late 2016 it began moving inward to the crater floor: It then moved back to the rim and went south to gully named Perseverance Valley, leaving the Cape Tribulation section, and heading towards Cape Bryon.

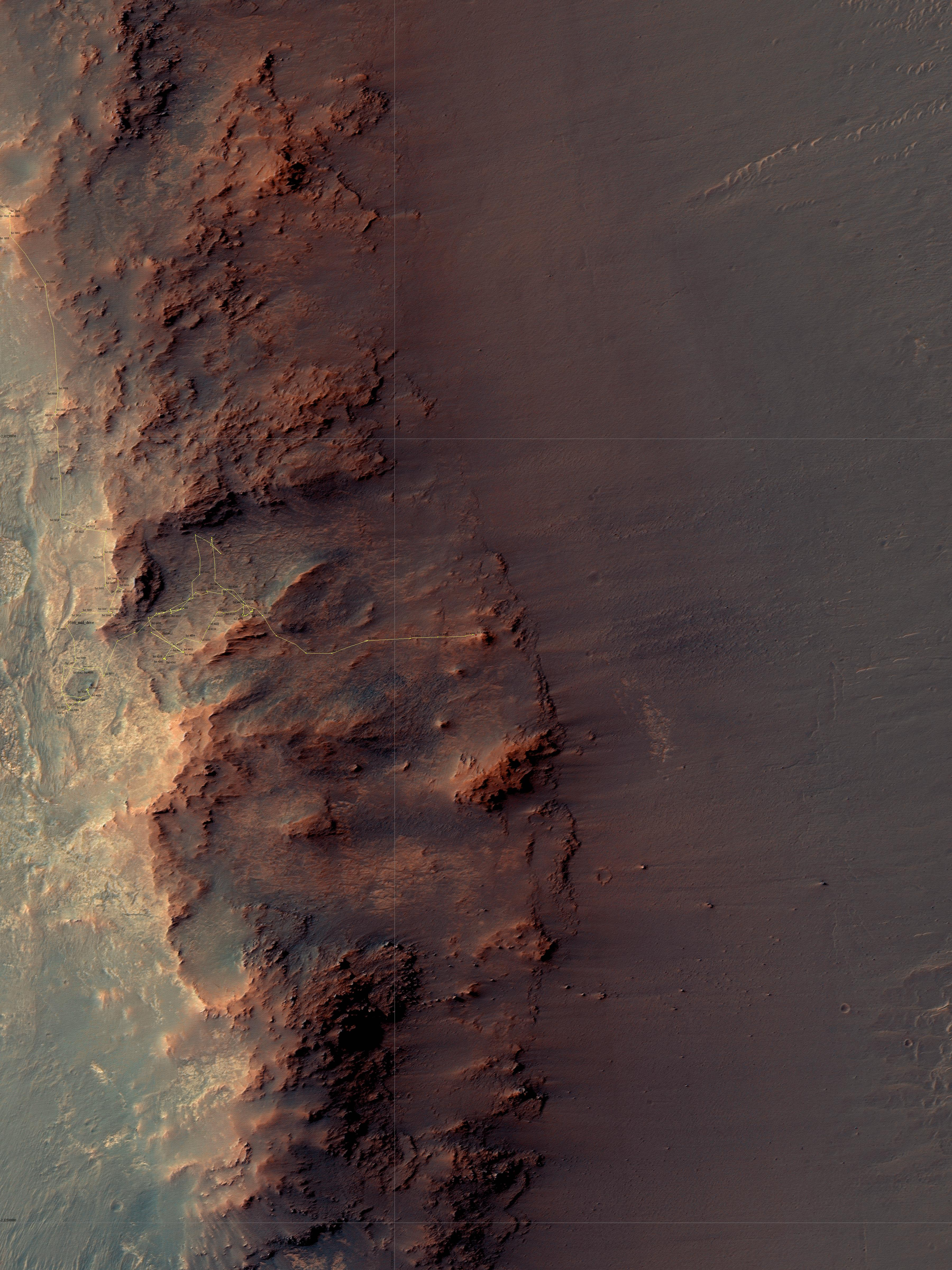
A detailed-class rover traverse map by the mission, released on September 28, 2016, showing the track of the rover up to Sol 4500 as it heads deeper in Endeavour

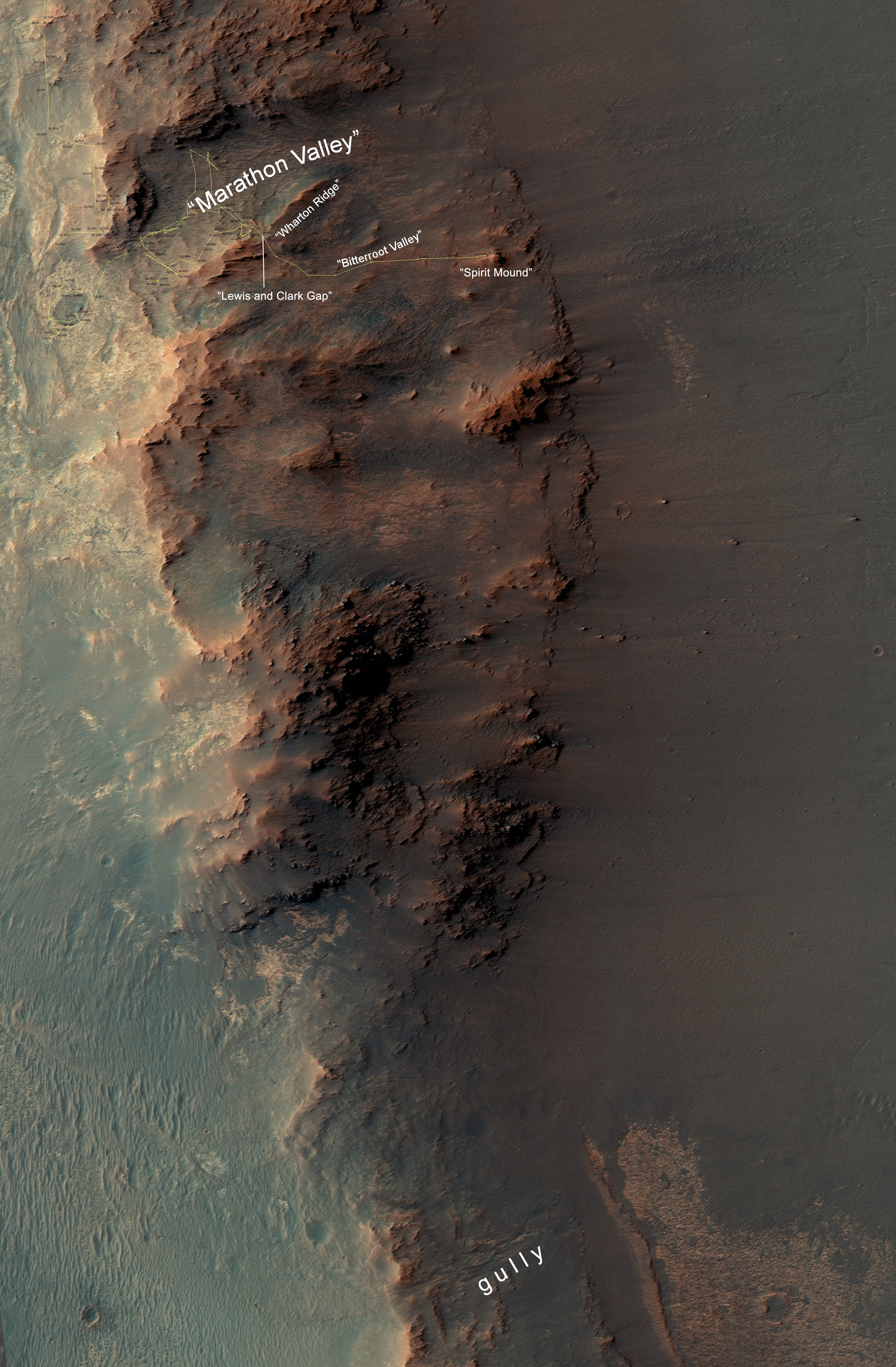
An annotated view of the traverse to Spirit mound, October 2016

Marathon Valley, 2016
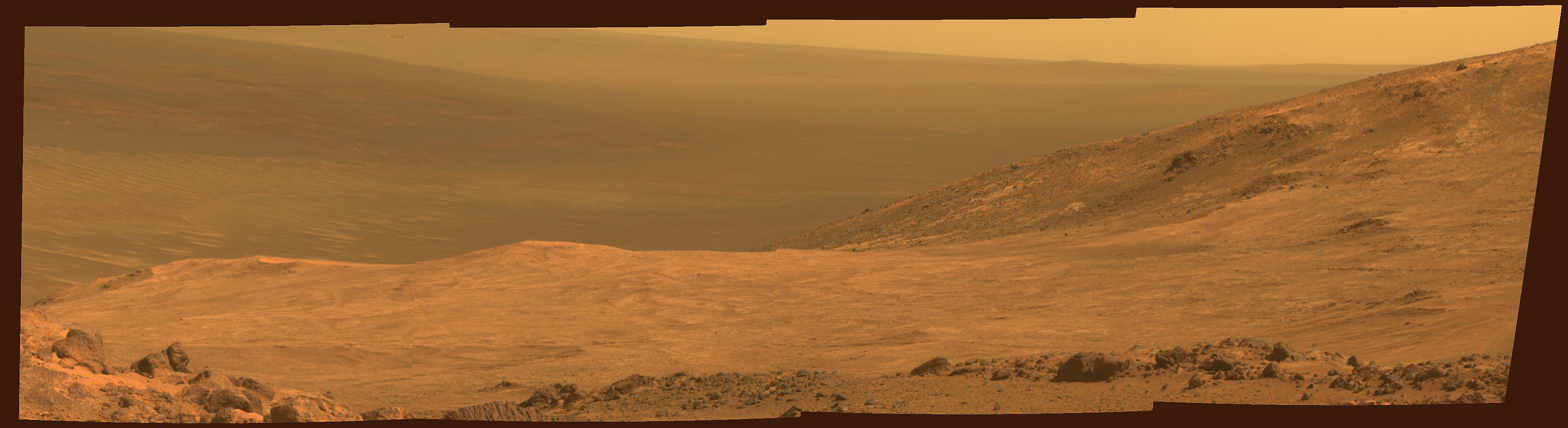
Marathon Valley as viewed by the Opportunity rover (false color; stereo; March 13, 2015).

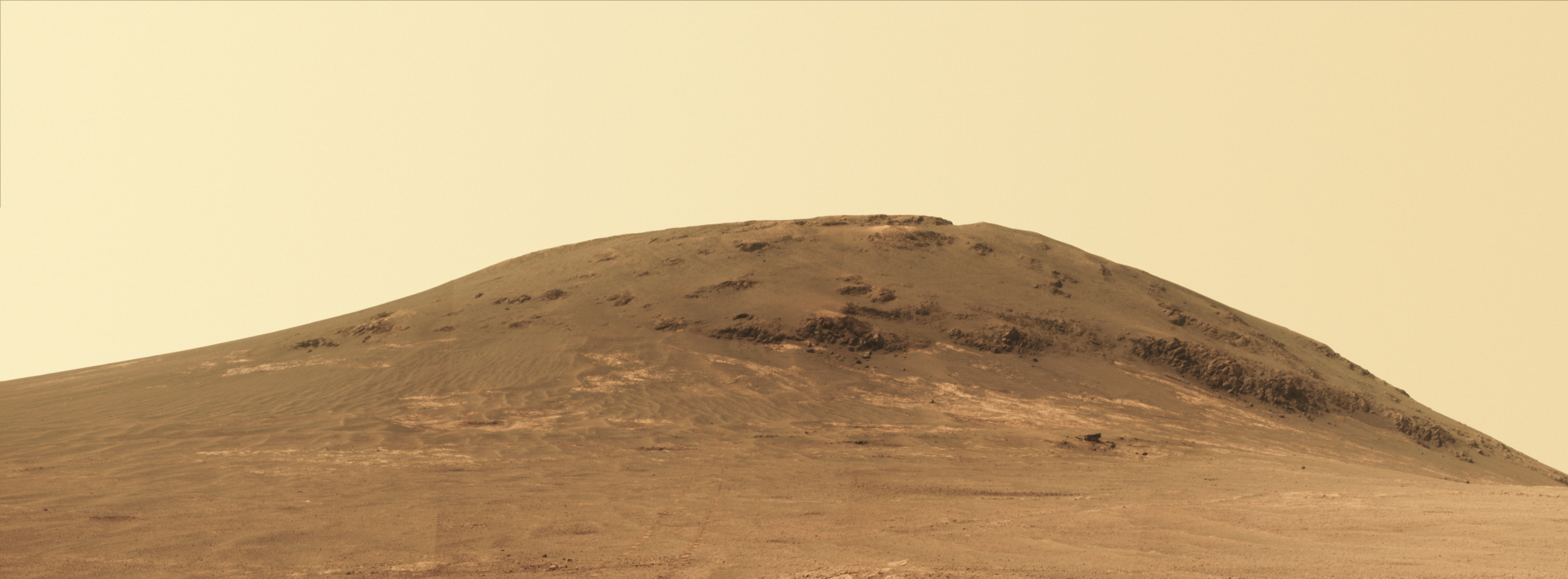
Opportunity looks at the southern end of Cape Tribulation as it heads south, showing how the Western rim ridge

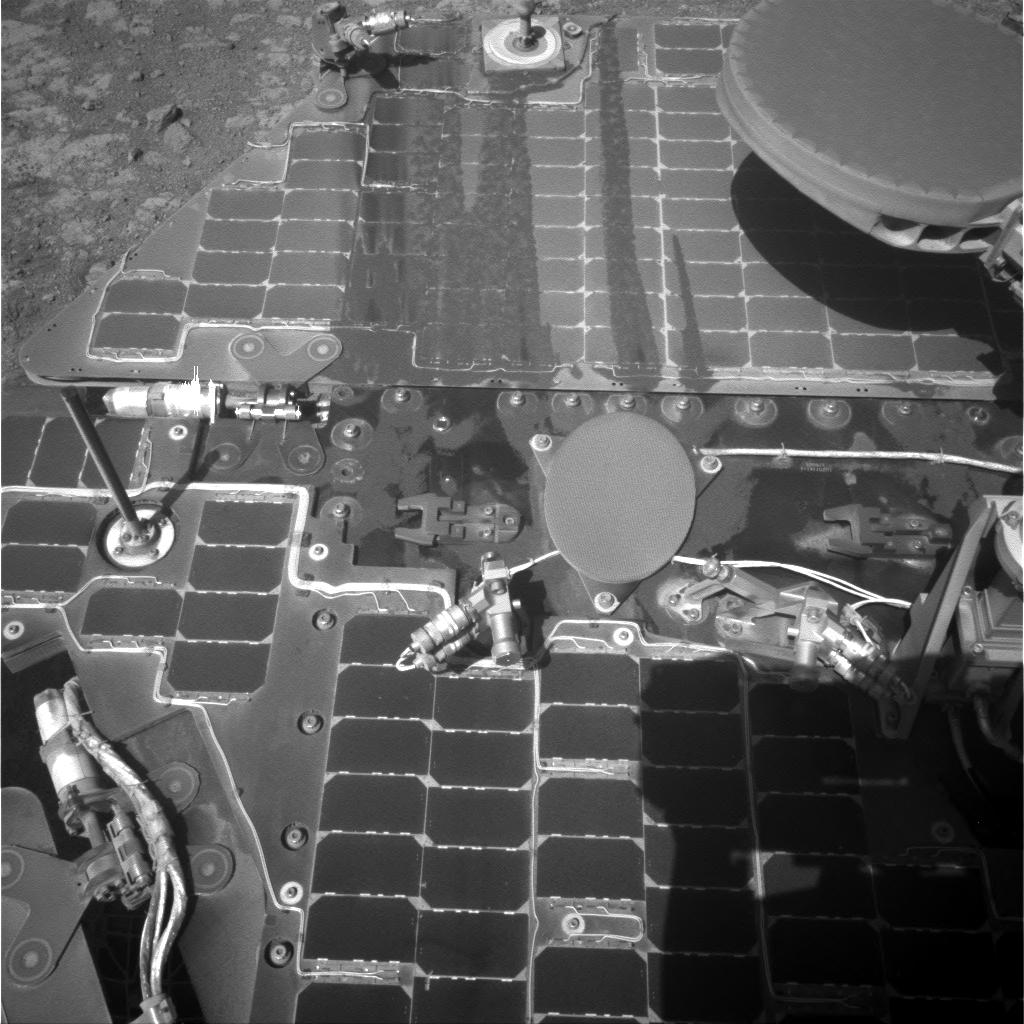
In March 2016, while trying to reach target on the slope of Marathon Valley in Cape Tribulation, the Mars rover attained a slope of 32 degrees, the highest angle yet for the rover since its mission began. This was so steep that dust that had accumulated on its top panels began to flow downward.

== Spirit of St. Louis ==
This crater sits at the Western mouth of Marathon Valley, south Cape Tribulation on the western rim of Endeavour. It was visited by the MER-B Opportunity rover in May 2015.

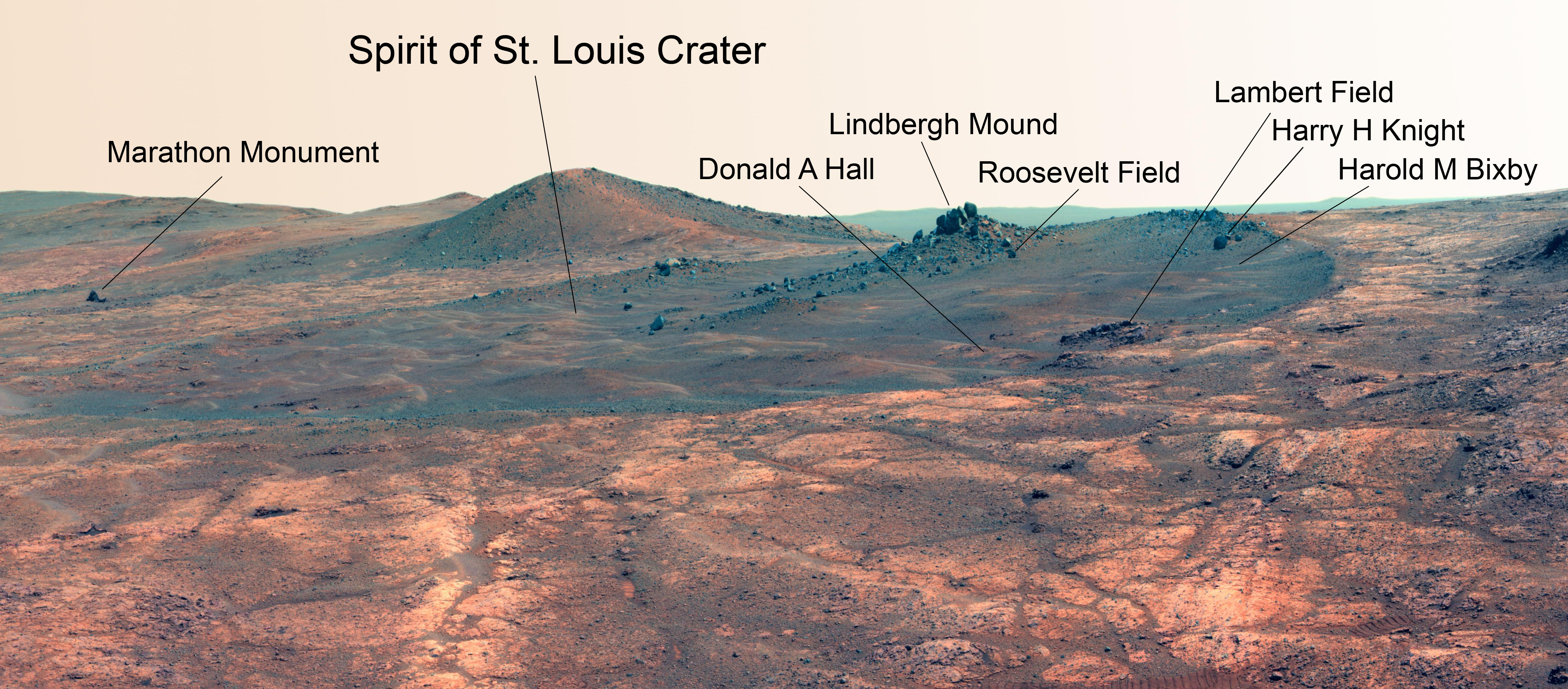
In May 2015 the rover visited what was dubbed Spirit of St. Louis, a shallow crater about 110 feet (34 meters) long and 80 feet (24 meters) across. In its center is Lindbergh Mound, about 2-3 meters (yards) high. This version of the panorama is annotated and in false color

== Above Perseverance Valley by Opportunity ==
Perseverance Valley is an erosion network in the Cape Bryon section of the Western Endeavour rim. It was named in April 2017 by the MER-B team, which previously referred to it as the gully.

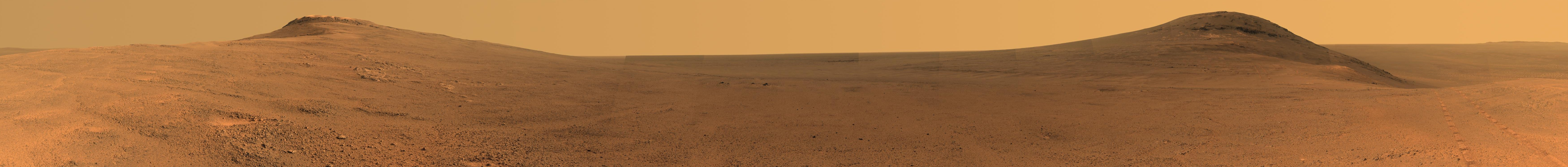
Above Perseverance Valley, July 2017

== Context ==
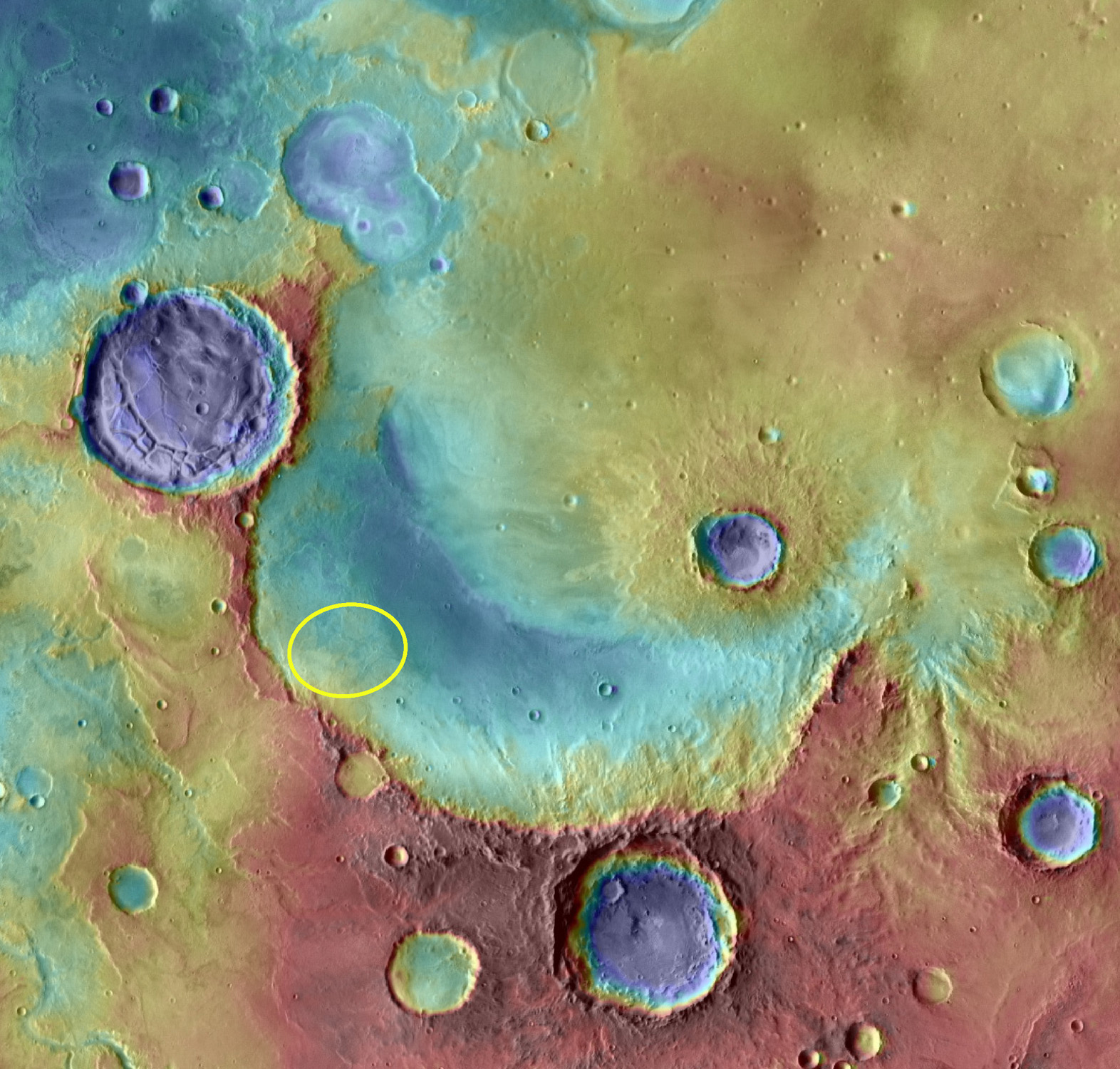
The proposed landing ellipse in Miyamoto when it was one of seven finalists under consideration as a landing site for MSL. Endeavour can be seen on the right side of the map, the top of three medium-sized craters in a north–south line. This map is color-coded based on elevation.

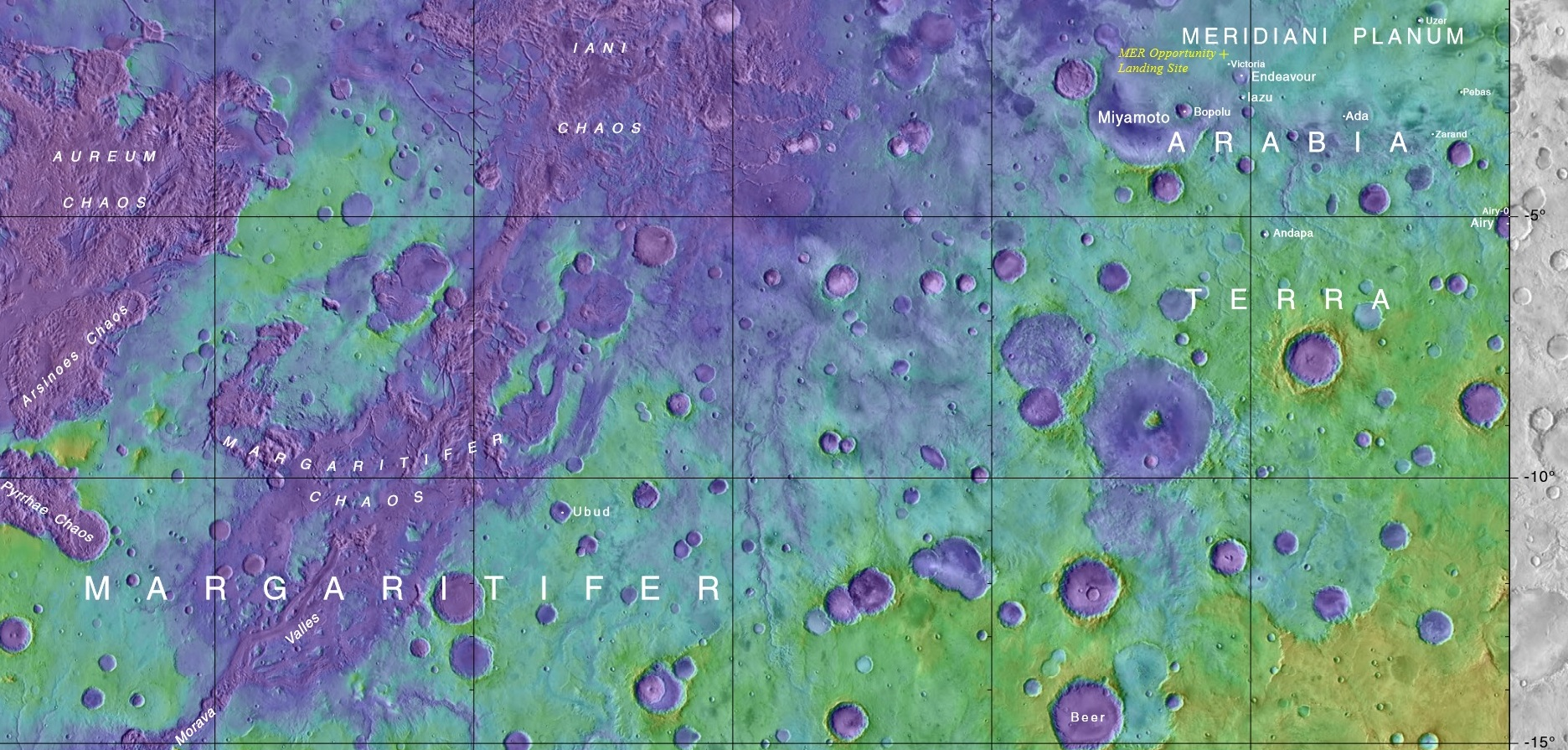
Map showing the location of Endeavour and other, nearby features

== Comparison ==
Endeavour is about the same size as Valles Caldera in the U.S. State of New Mexico, a volcanic Caldera of the Valles Caldera National Preserve. Endeavour has been compared to the Mars craters' Santa Fe (crater), which is about 20.2 km in diameter, and also to Tooting (crater), which is 27.5 km in diameter.

== See also ==
- List of craters on Mars
- Geography of Mars
- Cape York (Mars) (Point on western ridge where Mars rover Opportunity arrived at in 2011)
- Solander Point (Point on western ridge ascended by a Mars rover Opportunity in 2013)
- Nearby Locations in Meridiani Planum:
  - Victoria Crater
  - Iazu (crater)
  - Bopolu (crater)
  - Miyamoto (crater)
