= Iazu =

Iazu may refer to:

- Iazu (crater), a crater on Mars
- Iazu, a village in Cojasca Commune, Dâmbovița County, Romania
- Iazu, a village in Scânteia Commune, Ialomița County, Romania
- Iazu, a village in Măgurele Commune, Prahova County, Romania
