= Amazonian (Mars) =

Time period on Mars

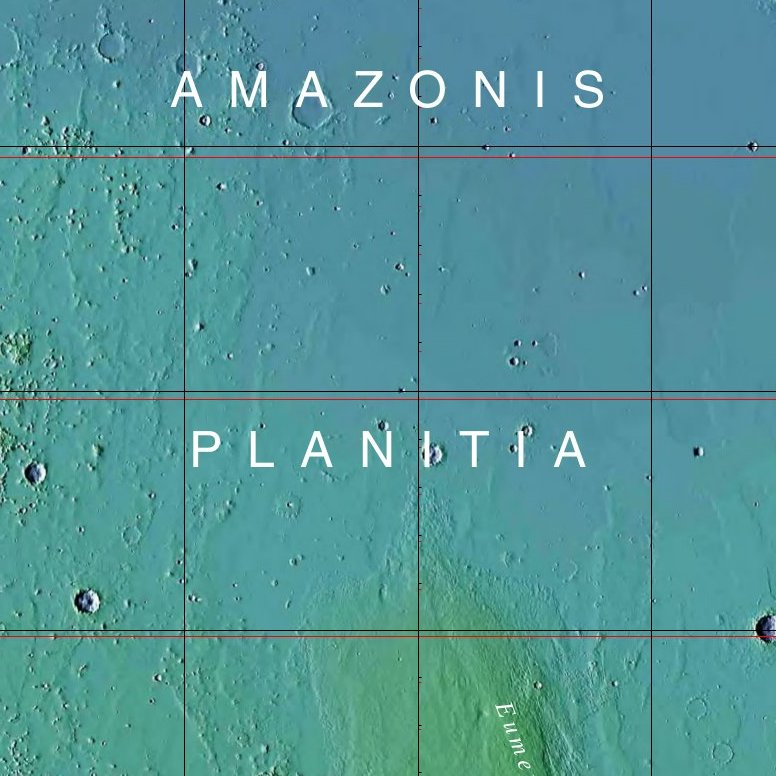
- MOLA colorized relief map of Amazonis Planitia, the type area for the Amazonian System. Amazonis Planitia is characterized by low rates of meteorite and asteroid impacts. Colors indicate elevation, with red highest, yellow intermediate, and green/blue lowest.

Usage information
- Celestial body: Mars
- Time scale(s) used: Martian Geologic Timescale

Definition
- Chronological unit: Period
- Stratigraphic unit: System
- Type section: Amazonis Planitia

The Amazonian is a geologic system and time period on the planet Mars characterized by low rates of meteorite and asteroid impacts and by cold, hyperarid conditions broadly similar to those on Mars today. The transition from the preceding Hesperian period is somewhat poorly defined. The Amazonian is thought to have begun around 3 billion years ago, although error bars on this date are extremely large (~500 million years). The period is sometimes subdivided into the Early, Middle, and Late Amazonian. The Amazonian continues to the present day.

The Amazonian period has been dominated by impact crater formation and Aeolian processes with ongoing isolated volcanism occurring in the Tharsis region and Cerberus Fossae, including signs of activity as recently as a tens of thousands of years ago in the latter and within the past few million years on Olympus Mons, implying they may still be active but dormant in the present.

== Description and name origin ==
The Amazonian System and Period is named after Amazonis Planitia, which has a sparse crater density over a wide area. Such densities are representative of many Amazonian-aged surfaces. The type area of the Amazonian System is in the Amazonis quadrangle (MC-8) around 15°N 158°W.

Martian Time Periods (Millions of Years Ago)

== Amazonian chronology and stratigraphy ==
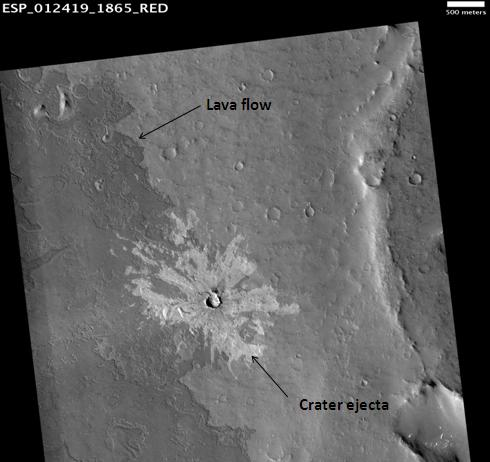
HiRISE image illustrating superpositioning, a principle that lets geologists determine the relative ages of surface units. The dark-toned lava flow overlies (is younger than) the light-toned, more heavily cratered terrain (older lava flow?) at right. The ejecta of the crater at center overlies both units, indicating that the crater is the youngest feature in the image.

Because it is the youngest of the Martian periods, the chronology of the Amazonian is comparatively well understood through traditional geological laws of superposition coupled to the relative dating technique of crater counting. The scarcity of craters characteristic of the Amazonian also means that unlike the older periods, fine scale (<100 m) surface features are preserved. This enables detailed, process-orientated study of many Amazonian-age surface features of Mars as the necessary details of form of the surface are still visible.

Furthermore, the relative youth of this period means that over the past few hundred million years it remains possible to reconstruct the statistics of the orbital mechanics of the Sun, Mars, and Jupiter without the patterns being overwhelmed by chaotic effects, and from this to reconstruct the variation of solar insolation – the amount of heat from the sun – reaching Mars through time. Climatic variations have been shown to occur in cycles not dissimilar in magnitude and duration to terrestrial Milankovich cycles.

Together, these features – good preservation, and an understanding of the imposed solar flux – mean that much research on the Amazonian of Mars has focussed on understanding its climate, and the surface processes that respond to the climate. This has included:

- glacial dynamics and landforms,
- the advance and retreat of ice across the planet,
- the behavior of ground ice and the periglacial forms which it produces,
- melt processes and small scale fluvial geomorphology,
- variation in atmospheric properties,
- groundwater dynamics,
- ice cap dynamics,
- CO_{2} frost dynamics, and exotic surface features related to them such as "spiders"
- the effects of wind on deposits of sand and dust and general aeolian sedimentology,
- and the modelling of past climate conditions (wind fields, temperatures, cloud properties, atmospheric chemistry) themselves.

Good preservation has also enabled detailed studies of other geological processes on Amazonian Mars, notably volcanic processes, brittle tectonics, and cratering processes.

=== System vs. Period ===
e h Units in Earth geochronology and stratigraphy
Segments of rock (strata) in chronostratigraphy	Periods of time in geochronology	Notes (Mars)
Eonothem	Eon	not used for Mars
Erathem	Era	not used for Mars
System	Period	3 total; 10^{8} to 10^{9} years in length
Series	Epoch	8 total; 10^{7} to 10^{8} years in length
Stage	Age	not used for Mars
Chronozone	Chron	smaller than an age/stage; not used by the ICS timescale

System and Period are not interchangeable terms in formal stratigraphic nomenclature, although they are frequently confused in popular literature. A system is an idealized stratigraphic column based on the physical rock record of a type area (type section) correlated with rocks sections from many different locations planetwide. A system is bound above and below by strata with distinctly different characteristics (on Earth, usually index fossils) that indicate dramatic (often abrupt) changes in the dominant fauna or environmental conditions. (See Cretaceous–Paleogene boundary as example.)

At any location, rock sections in a given system are apt to contain gaps (unconformities) analogous to missing pages from a book. In some places, rocks from the system are absent entirely due to nondeposition or later erosion. For example, rocks of the Cretaceous System are absent throughout much of the eastern central interior of the United States. However, the time interval of the Cretaceous (Cretaceous Period) still occurred there. Thus, a geologic period represents the time interval over which the strata of a system were deposited, including any unknown amounts of time present in gaps. Periods are measured in years, determined by radioactive dating. On Mars, radiometric ages are not available except from Martian meteorites whose provenance and stratigraphic context are unknown. Instead, absolute ages on Mars are determined by impact crater density, which is heavily dependent upon models of crater formation over time. Accordingly, the beginning and end dates for Martian periods are uncertain, especially for the Hesperian/Amazonian boundary, which may be in error by a factor of 2 or 3.

== Images ==
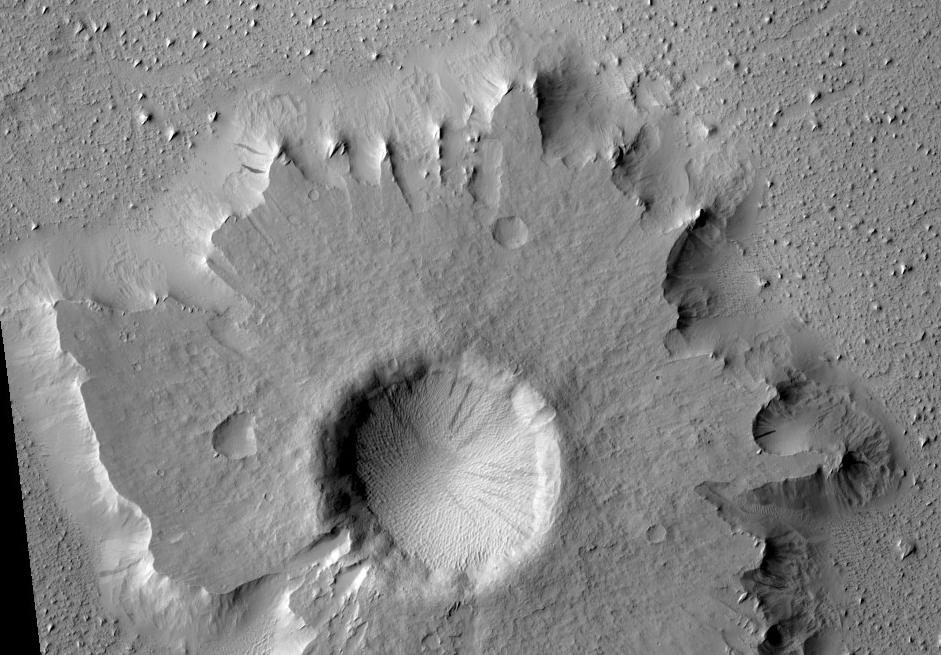
Pedestal crater in Amazonis with Dark Slope Streaks, as seen by HiRISE.

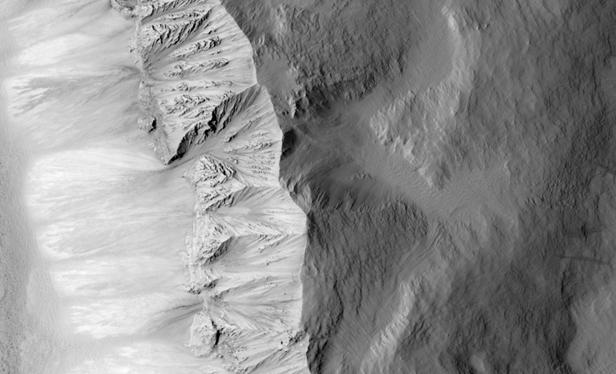
Wall of Tooting Crater, as seen by HiRISE.

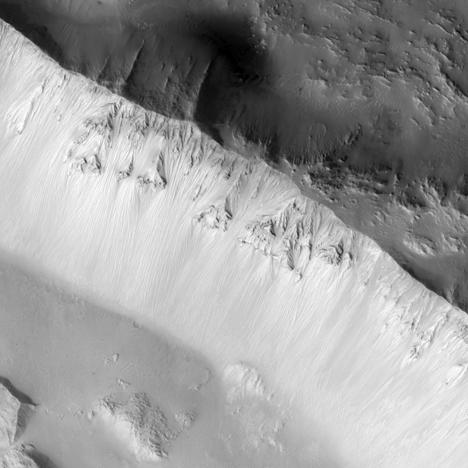
Pettit Crater rim, as seen by HiRISE.

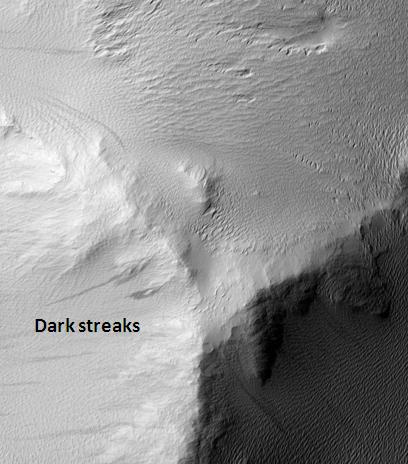
Nicholson mound with dark streaks, as seen by HiRISE.

Lycus Sulci, as seen by HiRISE.

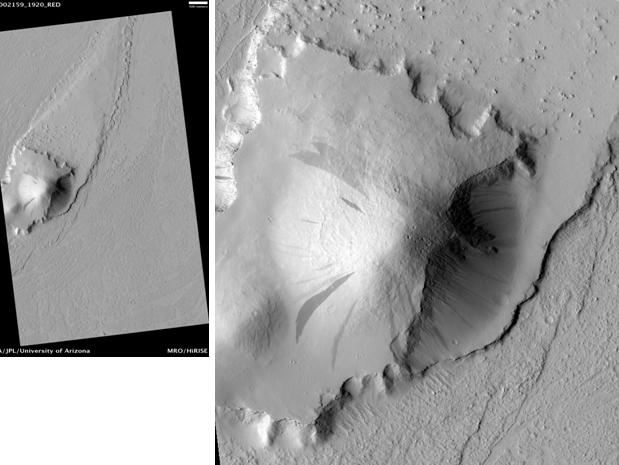
Streamlined Island in Marte Vallis, as seen by HiRISE.

Tartarus Colles channel, as seen by HiRISE.

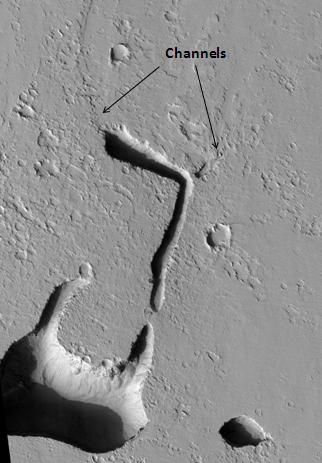
Channels From Fissure, as seen by HiRISE.

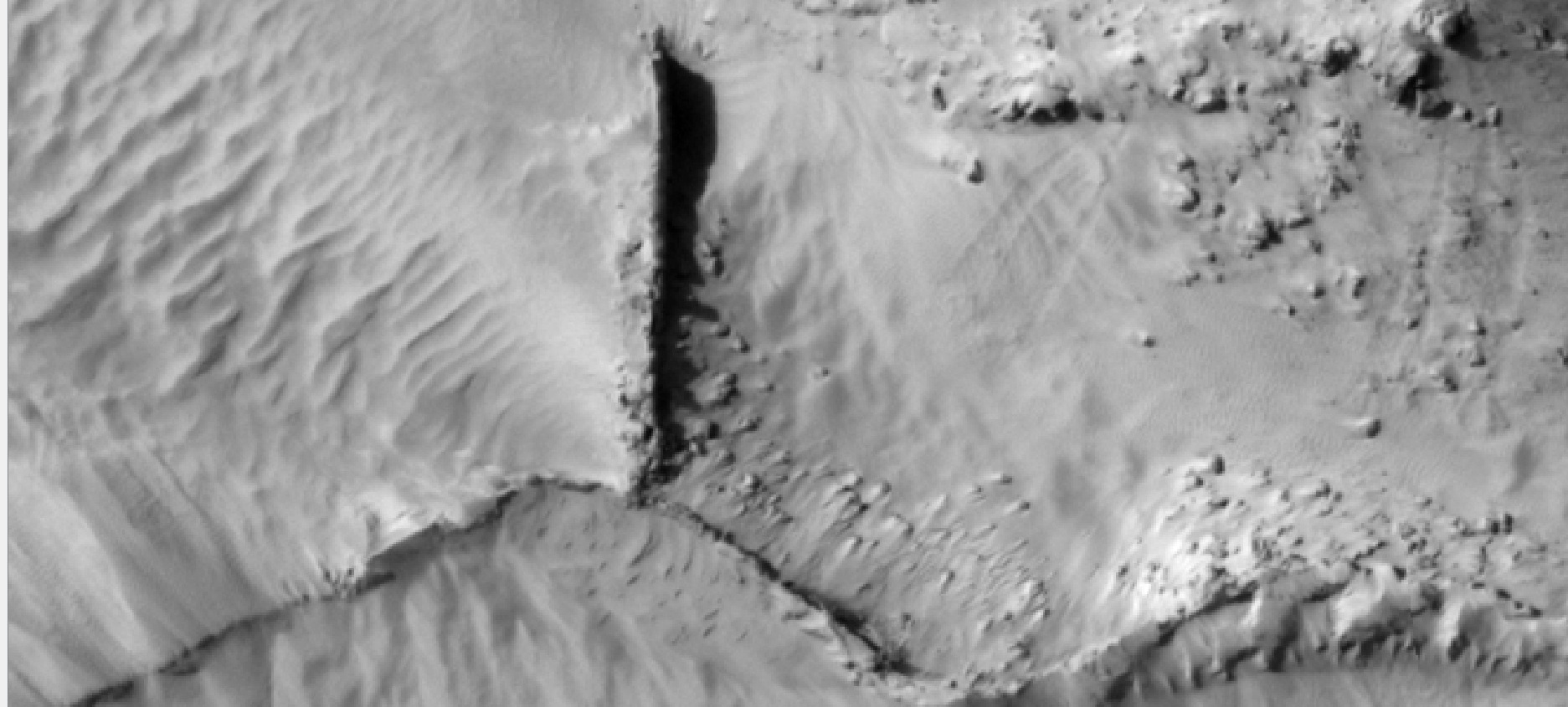
Narrow ridges, as seen by HiRISE.

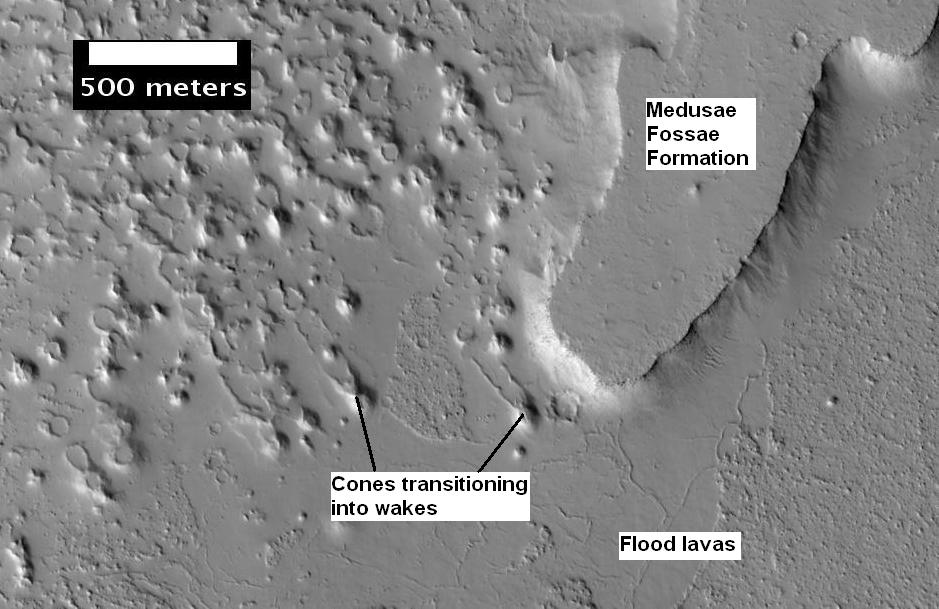
Plateau made up of Medusae Fossae materials and rootless cones, as seen by HiRISE.

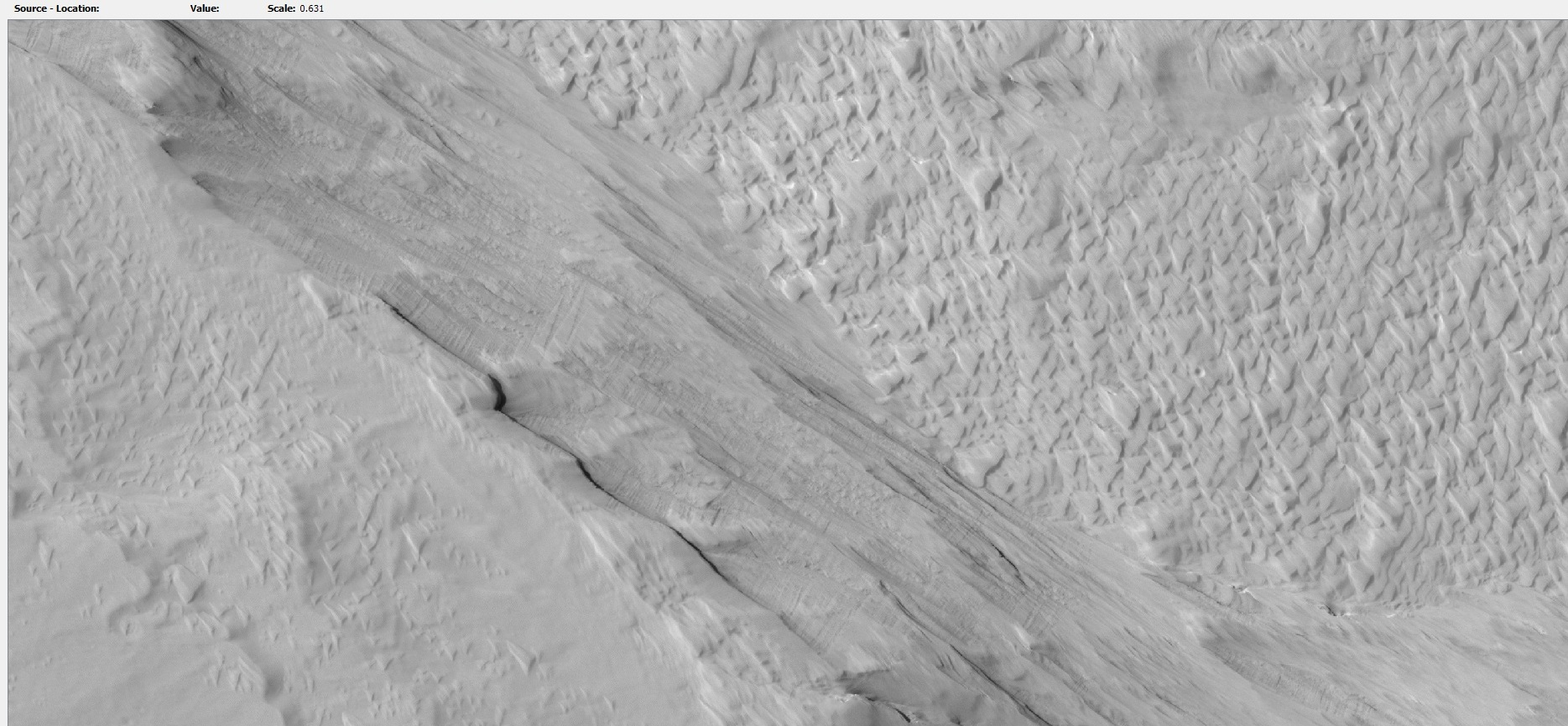
Surfaces in Amazonis quadrangle, as seen by HiRISE.

== See also ==
- Geological history of Mars
- Geology of Mars

== Bibliography and recommended reading ==
- Boyce, Joseph, M. (2008). The Smithsonian Book of Mars; Konecky & Konecky: Old Saybrook, CT, ISBN 978-1-58834-074-0
- Carr, Michael, H. (2006). The Surface of Mars; Cambridge University Press: Cambridge, UK, ISBN 978-0-521-87201-0.
- Hartmann, William, K. (2003). A Traveler's Guide to Mars: The Mysterious Landscapes of the Red Planet; Workman: New York, ISBN 0-7611-2606-6.
- Morton, Oliver (2003). Mapping Mars: Science, Imagination, and the Birth of a World; Picador: New York, ISBN 0-312-42261-X.
