= Bopolu (crater) =

Crater on Mars

Bopoulu
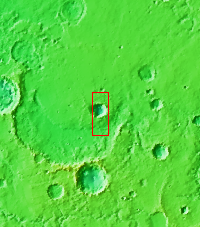
- Planet: Mars
- Region: Meridiani Planum
- Diameter: 19 kilometres (12 mi)

Bopolu is an impact crater located within the Meridiani Planum extraterrestrial plain of Mars. Bopulu was seen by Opportunity rover in 2010 in the distance, and with some of its rim visible. Bopolu was officially named in 2006 along with 31 Mars craters. Research has indicated that the impact that is thought to have created Bopulu went so deep that it went through existing layers and ejected older material from Mars' Noachian period. Bopulu is a 19 kilometres (12 mi) diameter wide crater south of the Opportunity MER-B landing site, a rover which operated in the region starting in 2004 and therefore resulted in greater exploration and study of craters in this region. Bopulu was identified as a possible source for the Bounce Rock ejecta fragment Bounce rock, which was examined by the MER-B rover, was found to be similar in composition to the shergottite class of Mars meteorite found on Earth (Meteorites found on Earth determined to be from Mars).

Bopulu is said be younger than the Burns Formation that predominates in the area. Bopolu has been studied, along with Tooting crater, to try and better understand the geology of Endeavour crater which MER-B rover reached and could explore in situ.

Bopolu is named for a town in nation of Liberia (see Bopolu, Africa); the name was approved by the IAU in September 2006. Bopolu crater has a feature ID of 14185.

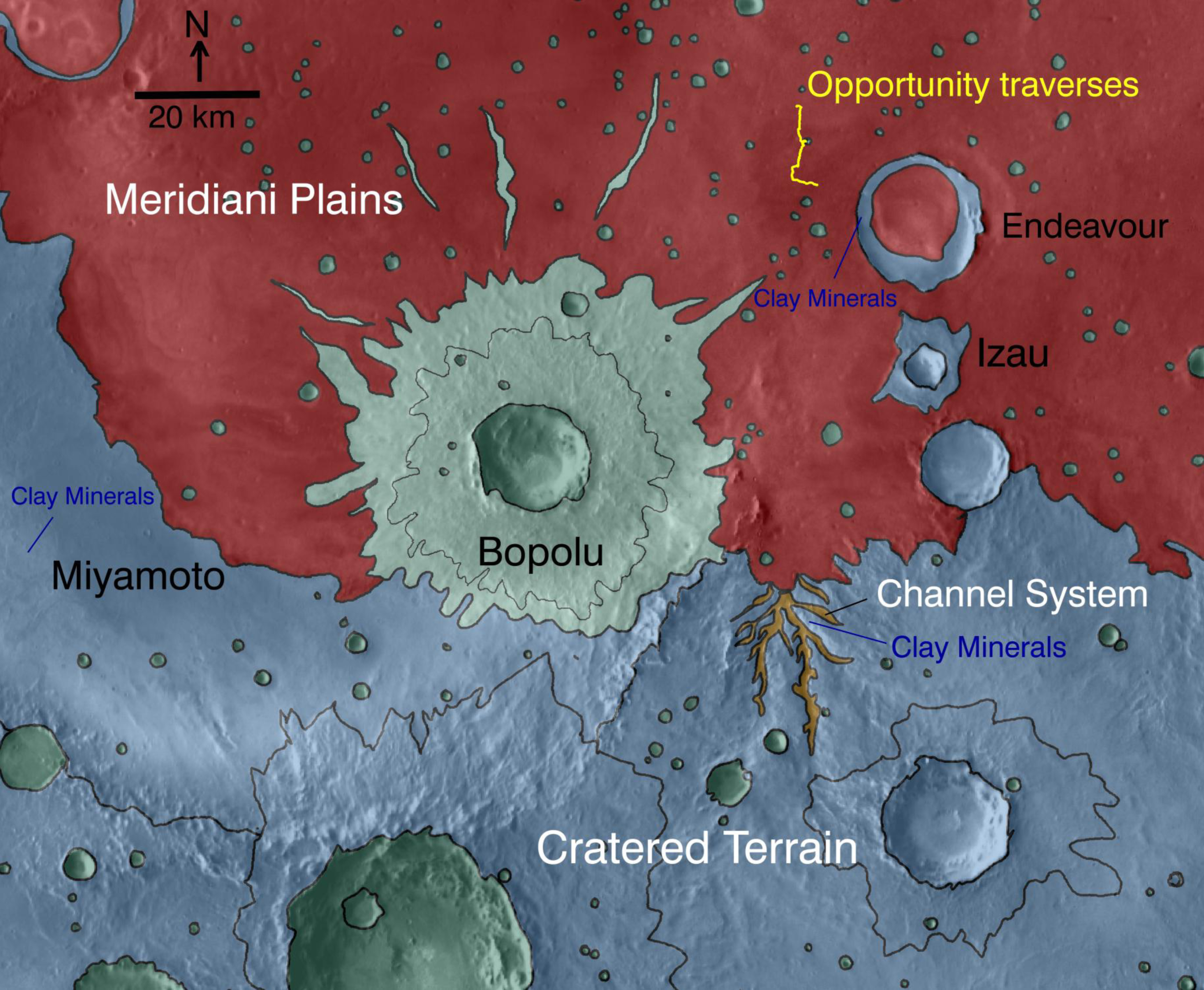
Color-coded for minerals and annotated, Bopolu crater is centered in this image with its distinctive ejecta detected by MRO's CRISM instrument. Nearby is Endeavour crater, reached by MER-B in 2011

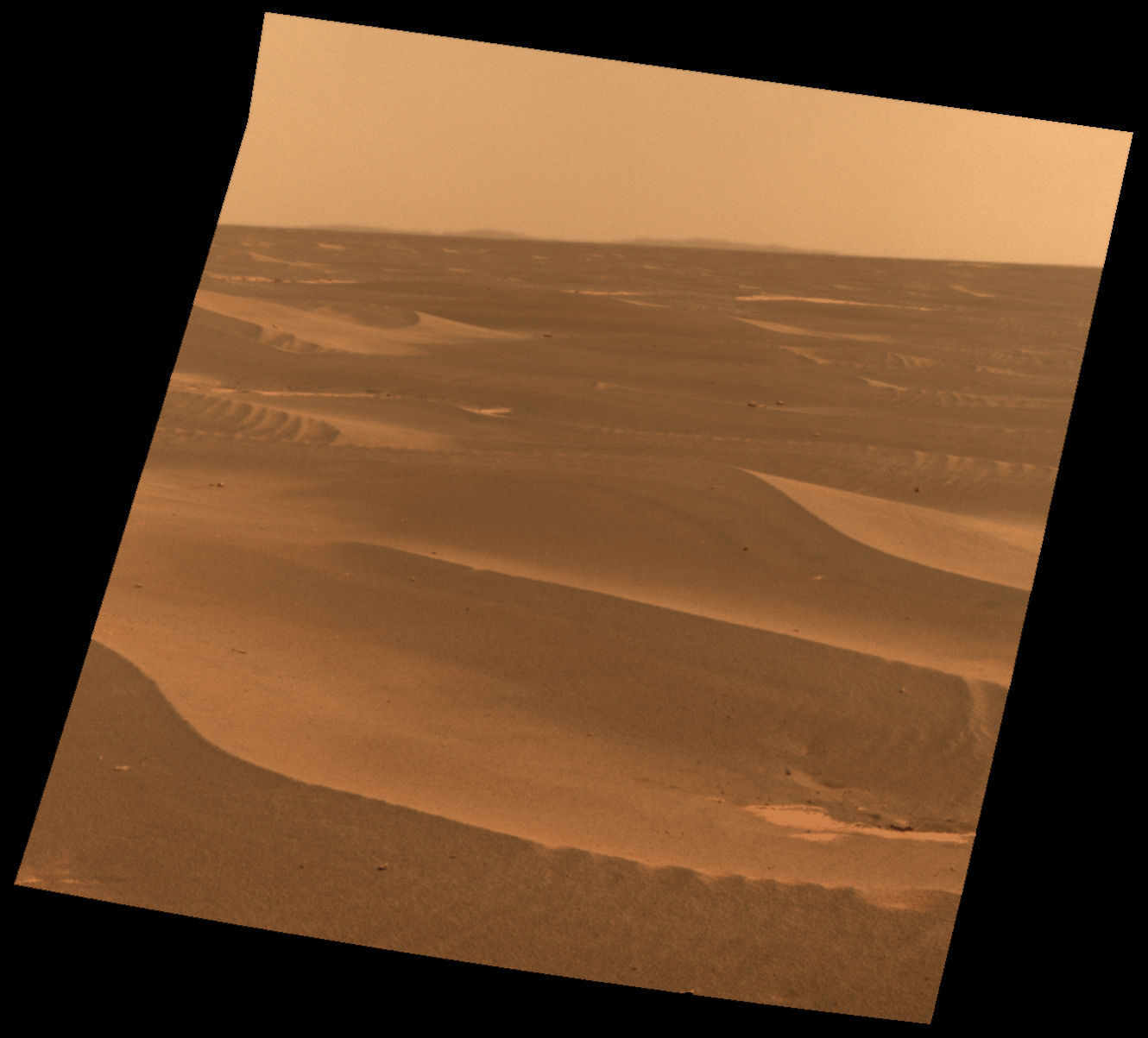
The rim of Bopolu crater is visible on the horizon of this March 2010 image taken by the Mars rover Opportunity; Bopolu is 65 kilometers (40 miles) away, when the rover was making its traverse to the closer Endeavour crater.

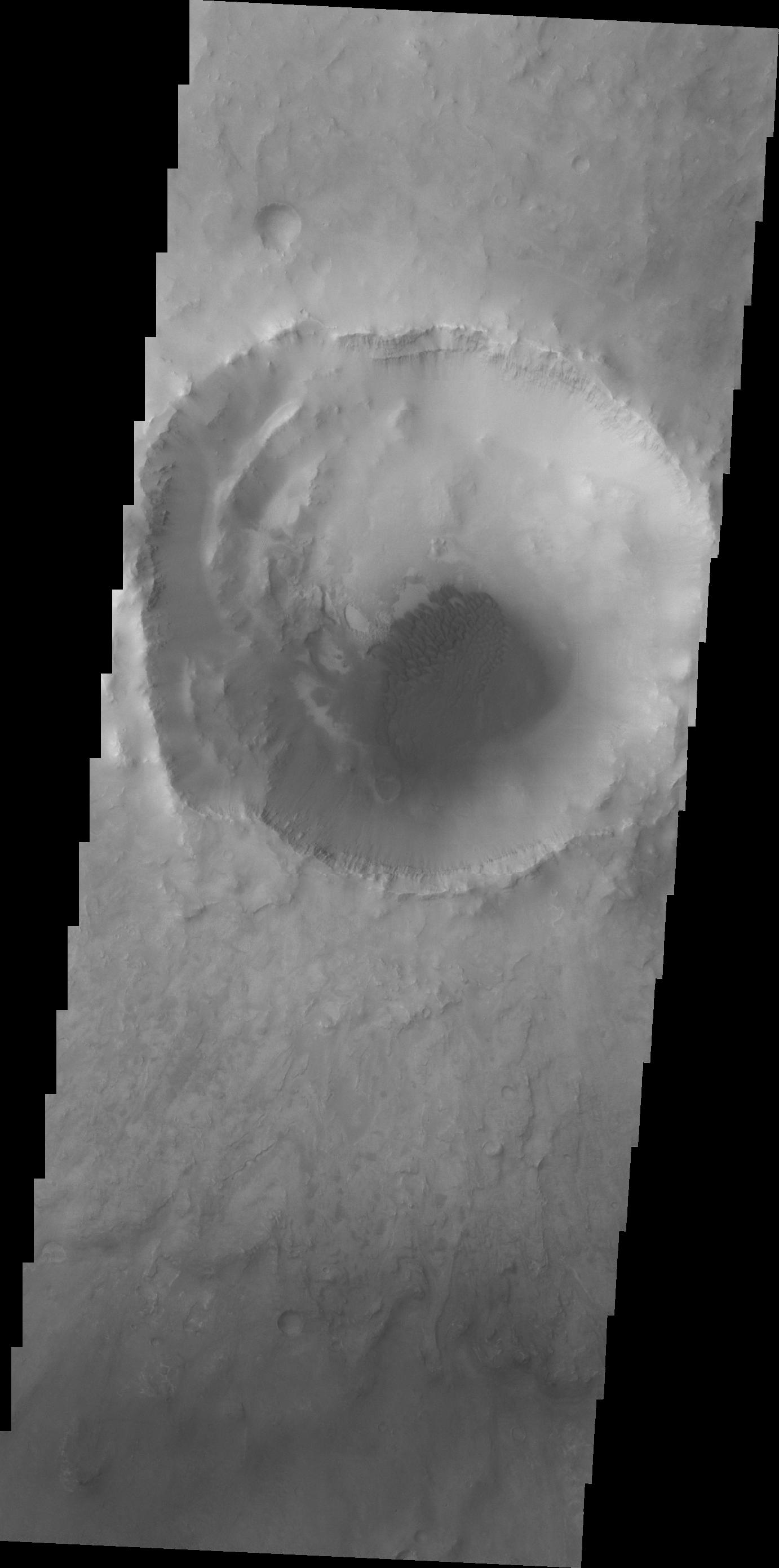
A view of Bopolu crater from the THEMIS instrument on 2001 Mars Odyssey

== Context map ==
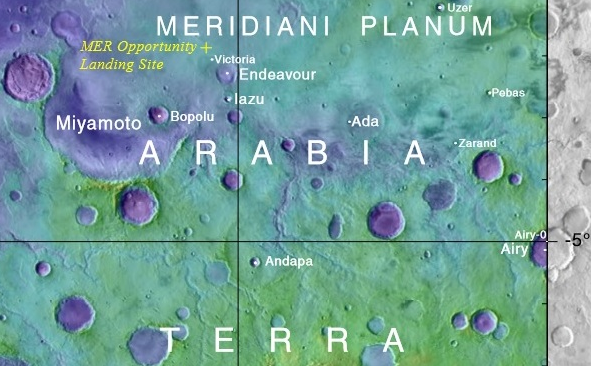
Annotated elevation map of Opportunity landing site and some surrounding craters including Endeavour and Airy

== See also ==
- List of craters on Mars
- Geography of Mars
- List of craters on Mars: A-G
- Craters in the area:
  - Endeavour (crater) (visited by MER-B)
  - Iazu (crater)
  - Miyamoto (crater)
  - ExoMars Schiaparelli EDM lander
