= Tooting (crater) =

Volcanic crater on Mars

- Planet: Mars
- Coordinates: 23.1°N 207.1°E
- Quadrangle: Amazonis
- Diameter: 28 km (17 mi)
- Depth: 1,200 metres (3,900 ft)
- Eponym: London suburb

Tooting is an impact crater (of the rampart crater type) with volcanic features at 23.1°N, 207.1°E, in Amazonis Planitia (Amazonis quadrangle), due west of the volcano Olympus Mons, on Mars. It was identified by planetary geologist Peter Mouginis-Mark in September 2004. Scientists estimate that its age is on the order of hundreds of thousands of years, which is relatively young for a Martian crater. A later study confirms this order of magnitude estimate. A preliminary paper describing the geology and geometry of Tooting was published in 2007 by the journal Meteoritics and Planetary Science, vol. 42, pages 1615–1625. Further papers have been published, including a 2010 analysis of flows on the walls of Tooting crater by A. R. Morris et al. (Icarus vol. 209, p. 369–389), and a 2012 review paper by P.J. Mouginis-Mark and J.M. Boyce in Chemie der Erde Geochemistry, vol. 72, p. 1–23. A geologic map has also been submitted in 2012 to the U.S. Geological Survey for consideration and future publication.

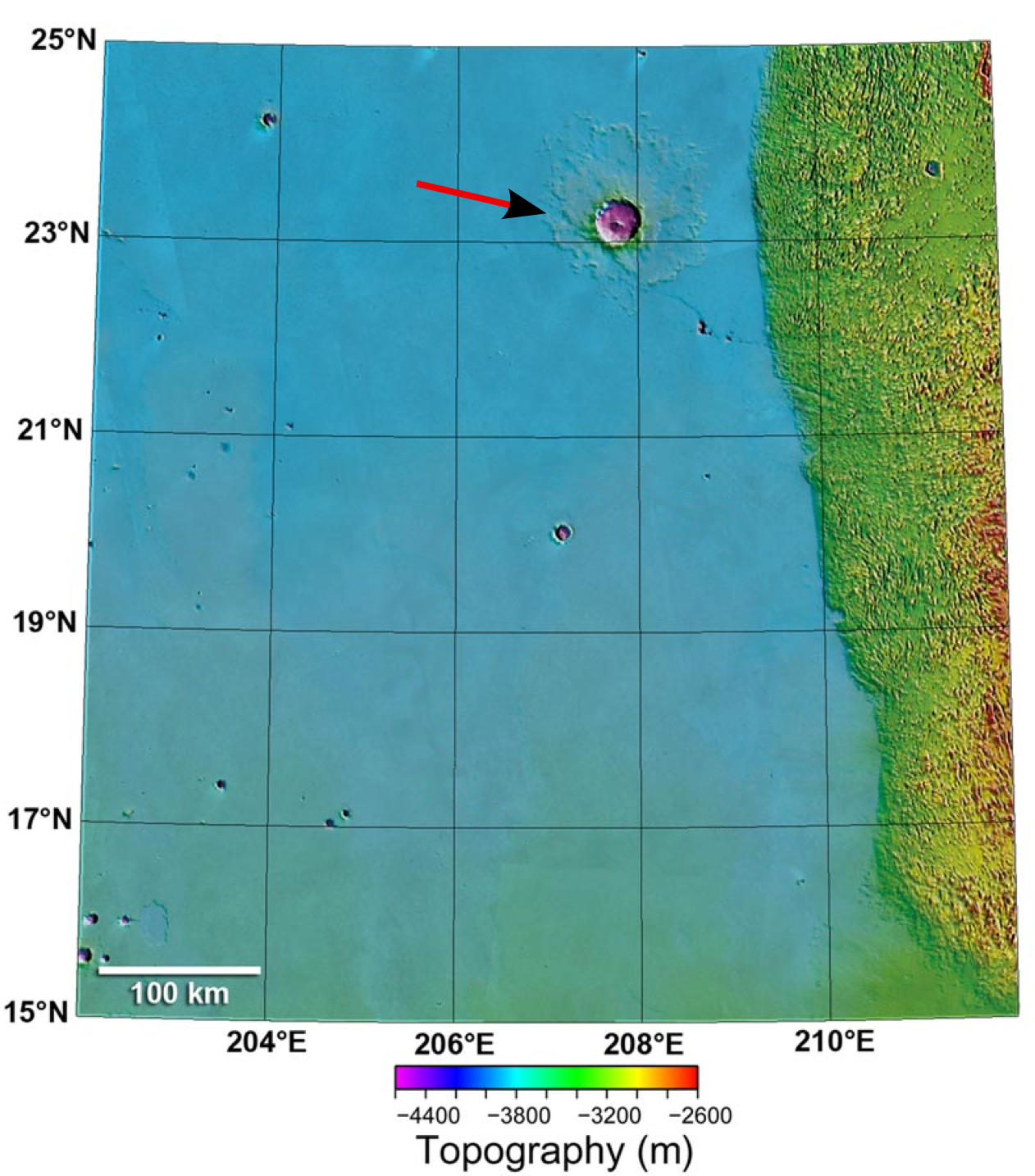
Topography of crater based on MOLA

== Naming ==
Tooting is named after the London suburb of the same name. This is in accordance with the International Astronomical Union's rules for planetary nomenclature, which specify that craters on Mars less than 60 km in diameter should be named after "villages of the world with a population of less than 100,000". The discoverer named it after his home town because he "thought [his] mum and brother would get a kick out of having their home town paired with a land form on Mars". This caused a stir in the British press, with many well-known media outlets reporting on the issue.

== Geology ==
The crater's youth was inferred from the lack of superimposed cratering, preserved impact melt in the crater, and that the central peak of the crater has not been buried by sediment.

Research published in the journal Icarus has found pits in Tooting Crater that are caused by hot ejecta falling on ground containing ice. The pits are formed by heat forming steam that rushes out from groups of pits simultaneously, thereby blowing away from the pit ejecta.

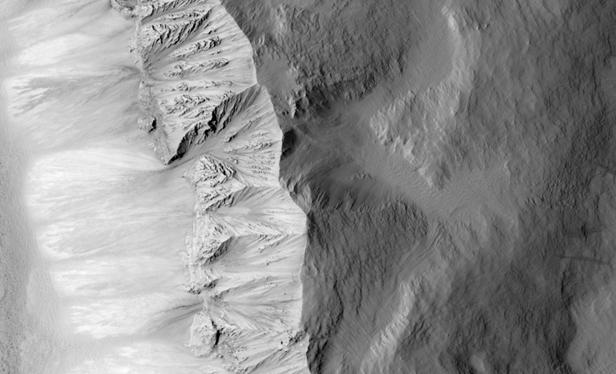
Wall of Tooting Crater, as seen by HiRISE.

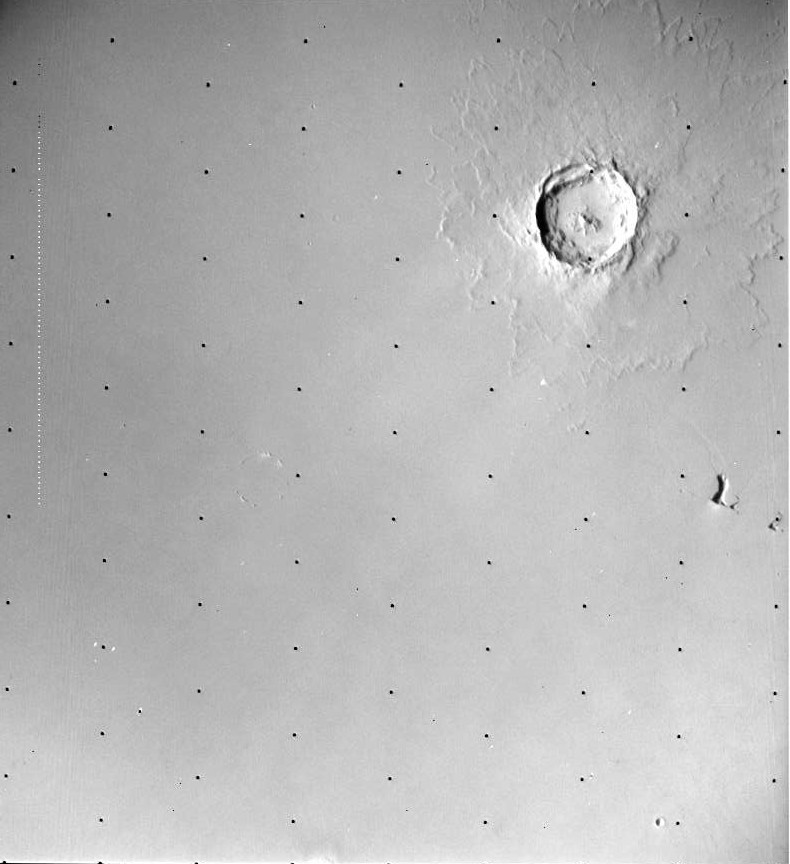
Viking orbiter 1 image of Tooting

Due to the flatness of the surrounding lava flows (at 3872 m below Martian datum), it is possible to infer much about the crater's formation and ejecta blanket. For example, the volume of ejecta deposited from the formation of the crater is estimated to be 450 cubic kilometres and that this process took less than half an hour.

== Comparison ==
Tooting has been compared to the craters Santa Fe and Endeavour (of Opportunity [MER-B] fame).

== Source of Martian Meteorites ==
Tooting has been suggested as the most likely source of depleted Shergottite meteorites that were ejected 1.1 million years ago.

== See also ==
- Impact crater
- List of craters on Mars
