= Iazu (crater) =

Crater on Mars

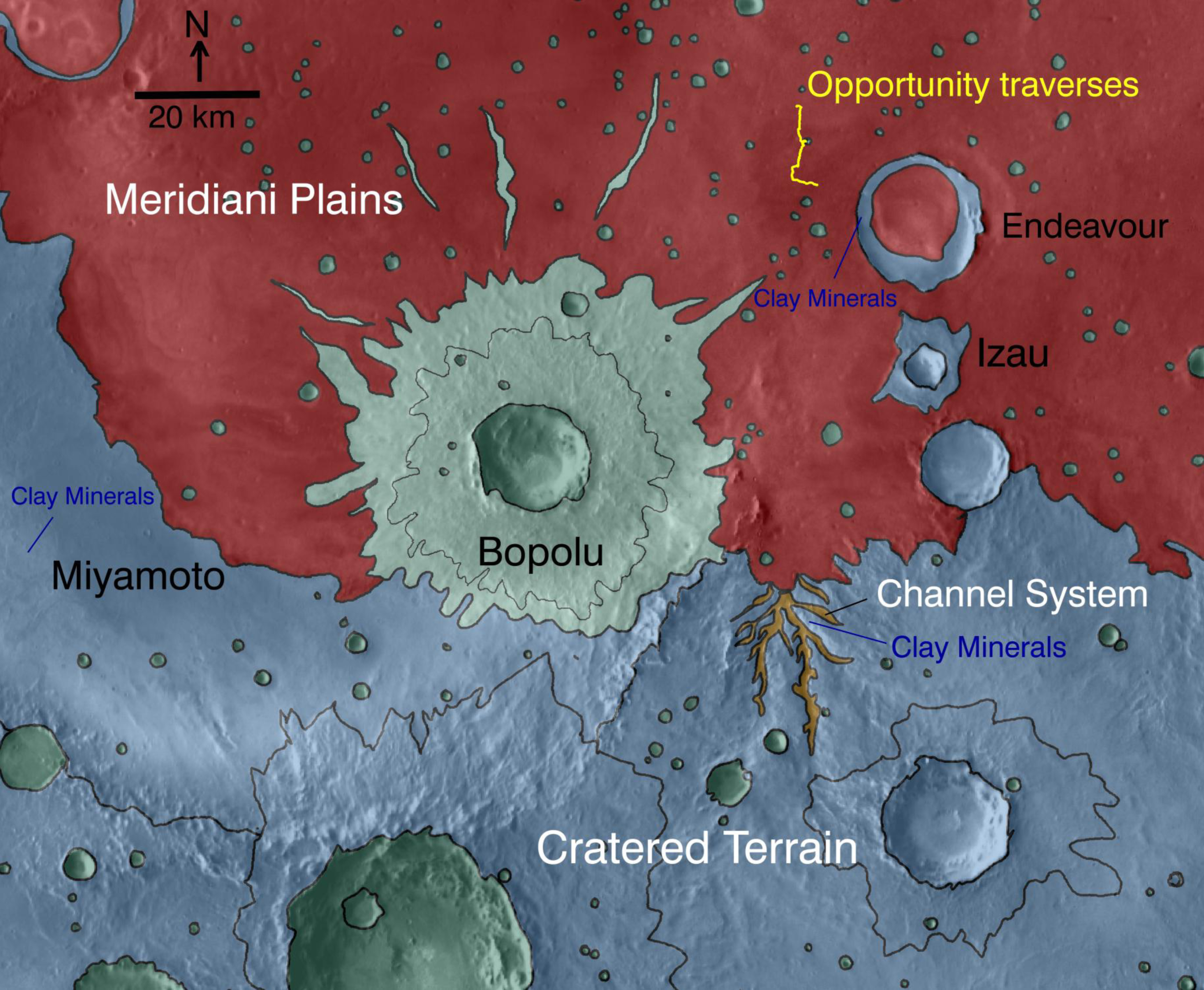
- Color-coded for minerals and annotated, Iazu crater is south of Endeavour crater
- Planet: Mars
- Region: Meridiani Planum
- Coordinates: 2.7°S 5.2°W
- Quadrangle: Margaritifer Sinus
- Diameter: 6.8 kilometers
- Eponym: Iazu, Romania

Iazu is an impact crater in the Meridiani Planum extraterrestrial plain, within the Margaritifer Sinus quadrangle (MC-19) region of the planet Mars. It is about 7 km in diameter. It is close to the landing site of the Mars Exploration Rover-B Opportunity, and its walls have been photographed by the spacecraft during its traverse to Endeavour Crater. At the time, the crater was about 38 kilometers (24 mi) away. It was named in 2006 for Iazu, a village in Dâmbovița County, southern Romania.

Bopolu (crater) is west of Iazu and Endeavour crater.

== Views from orbit ==
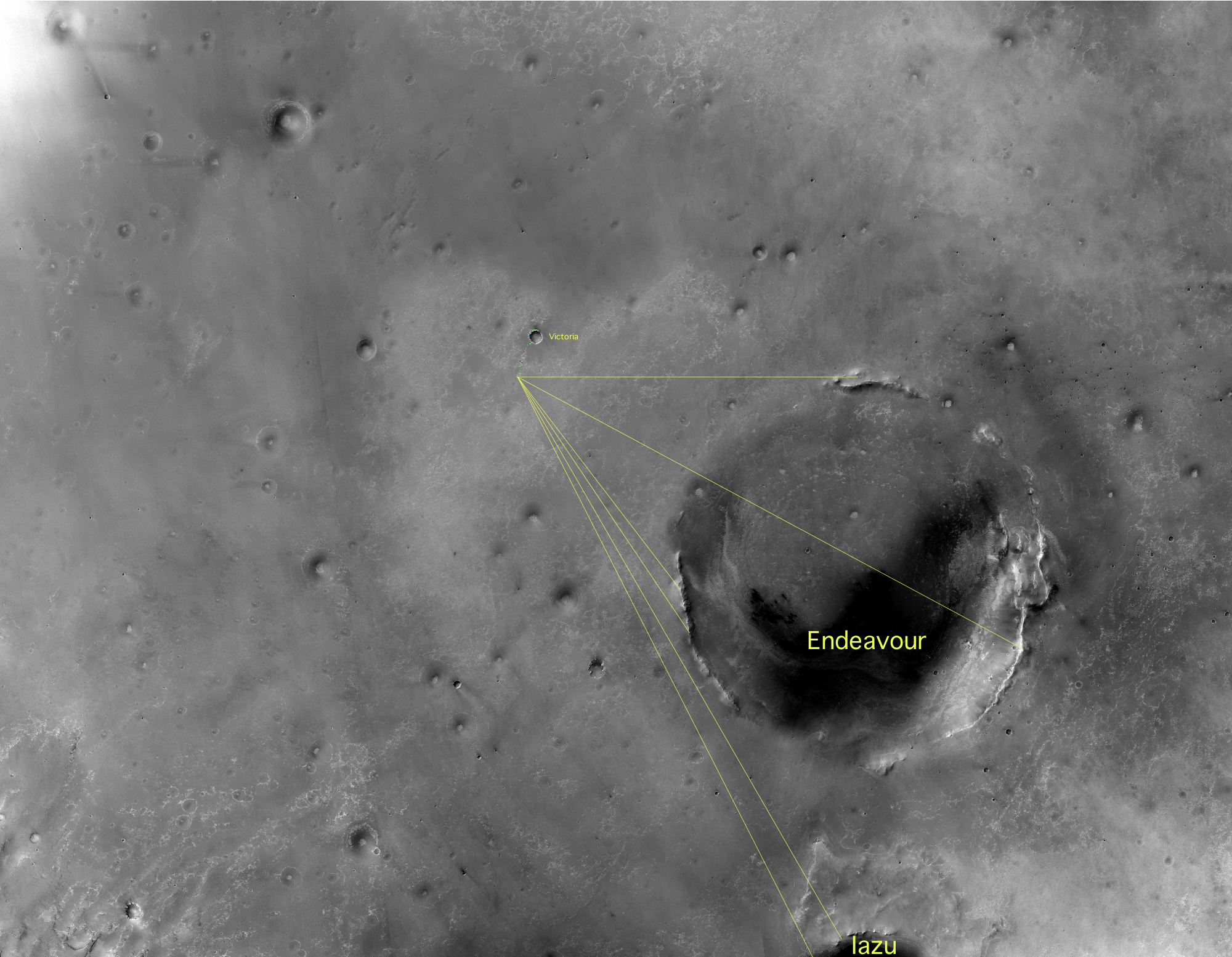
Annotated image showing the position of Opportunity and names for the craters Iazu, Endeavour, and Victoria

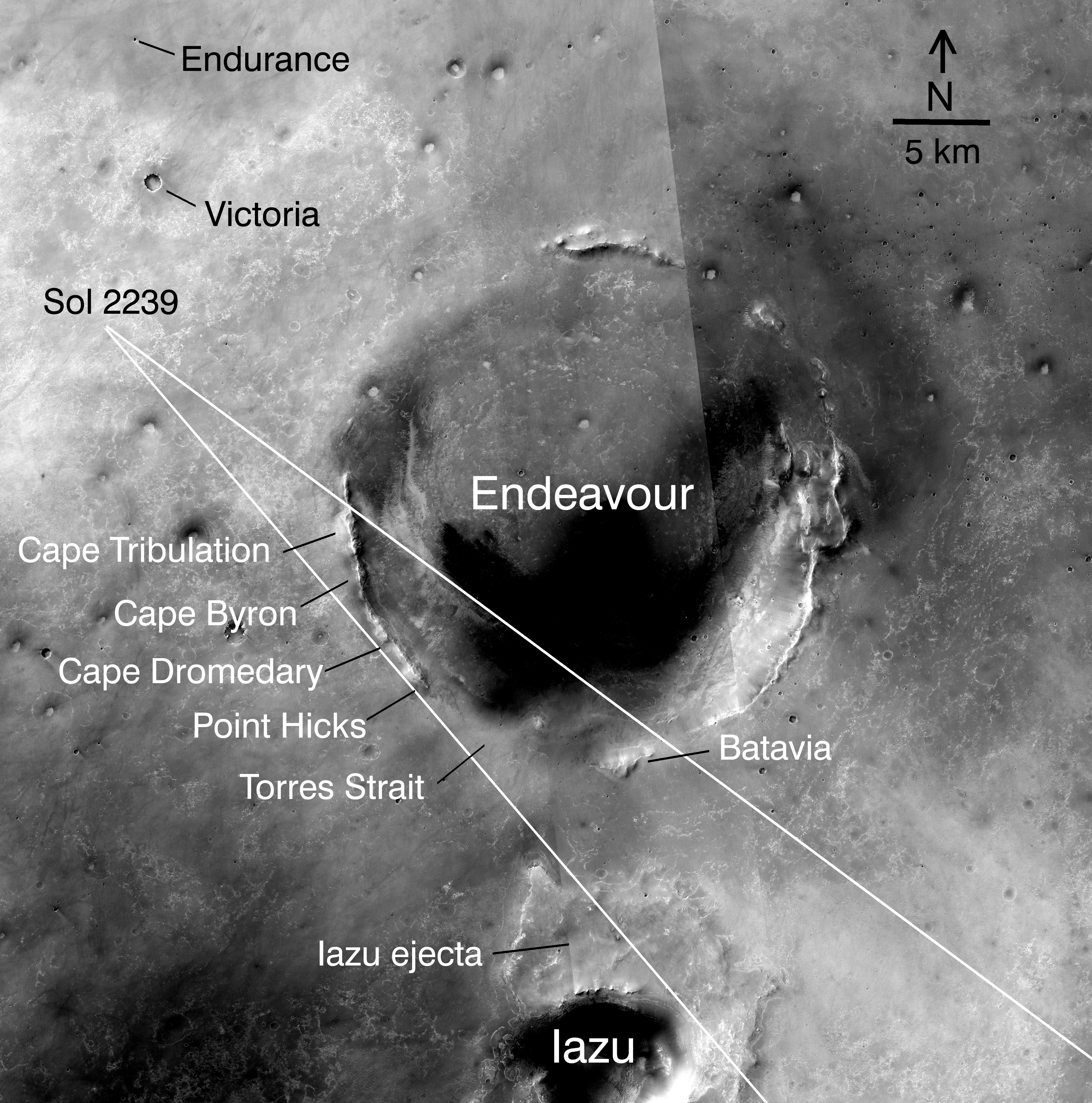
MER-B on Sol 2239 imaged the then distant craters including the Rim of Endeavour crater and Iazu ejecta

== From surface ==
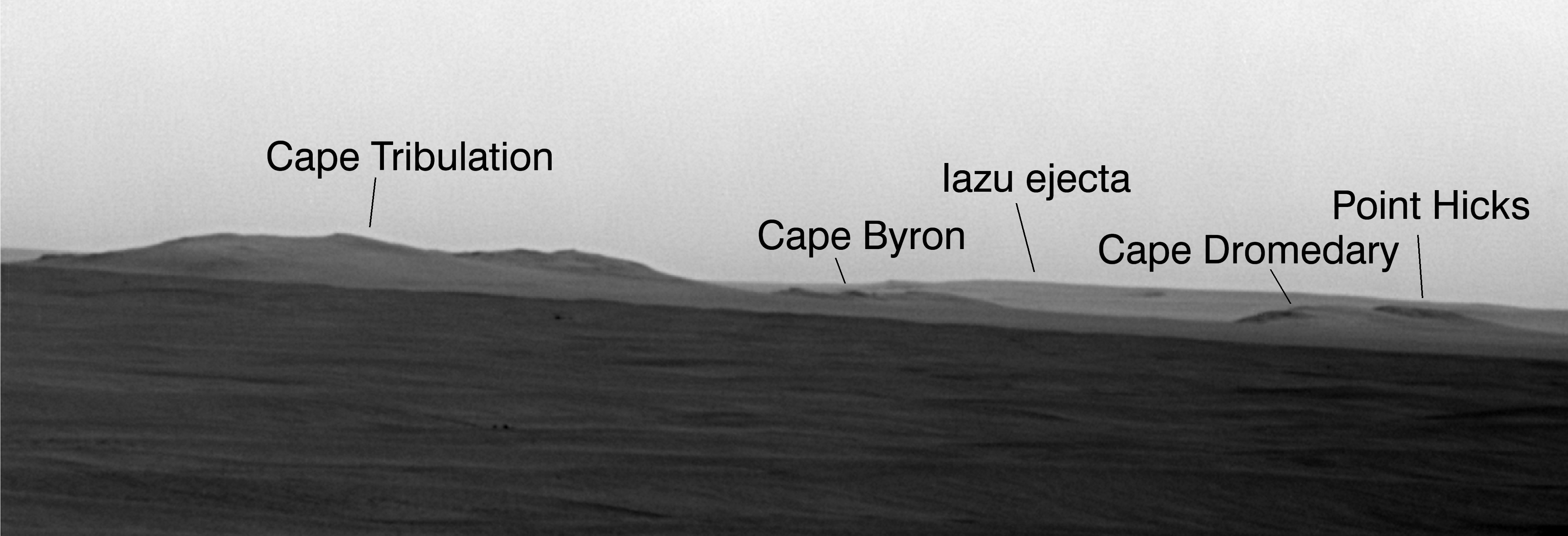
The field of view and context for this image on MER-B Sol 2239 is shown above, and in the distance the rim of Iazu is marked

== Context map ==
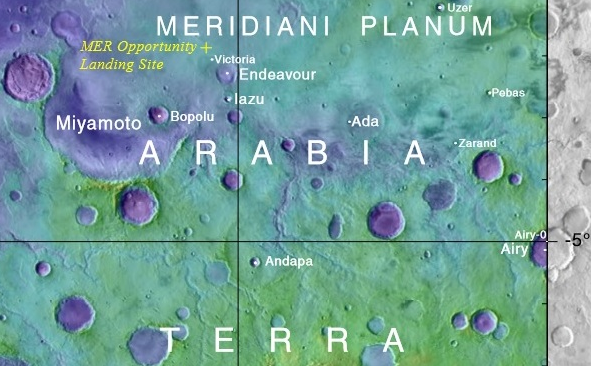
Annotated elevation map of Opportunity landing site and some surrounding craters including Endeavour and Airy

== See also ==
- List of craters on Mars
- Geography of Mars
