= Pangboche (crater) =

Pangboche Crater
- Pangboche Crater based on THEMIS daytime image
- Planet: Mars
- Coordinates: 17.22°N 133.62°W
- Quadrangle: Tharsis
- Diameter: 10 km
- Eponym: a village in Nepal

Pangboche is a young impact crater on Mars, in the Tharsis quadrangle near the summit of Olympus Mons. It was named after a village in Nepal. It measures 10 kilometer in diameter, and is at 17.47° N and 133.4° W.

The average depth of the crater is 954 m, and the height of the crater rim varies between 80 and 240 meters. Pangboche formed in young lava flows on the flank of Olympus Mons. The morphology of Pangboche is very similar to that of lunar craters, likely due to the lack of volatiles in both the atmosphere and the target. It lacks several features often attributed to the presence of volatiles in the target rocks, including layered ejecta and lobate flows. It is a complex crater featuring a flat floor and several terraces. Pangboche is estimated to be less than 240 million years old.

Pangboche Crater, as seen by HiRISE. Pangboche Crater is very young and sits near the summit of Olympus Mons.
