= Olympus Rupes =

Group of cliffs on Mars

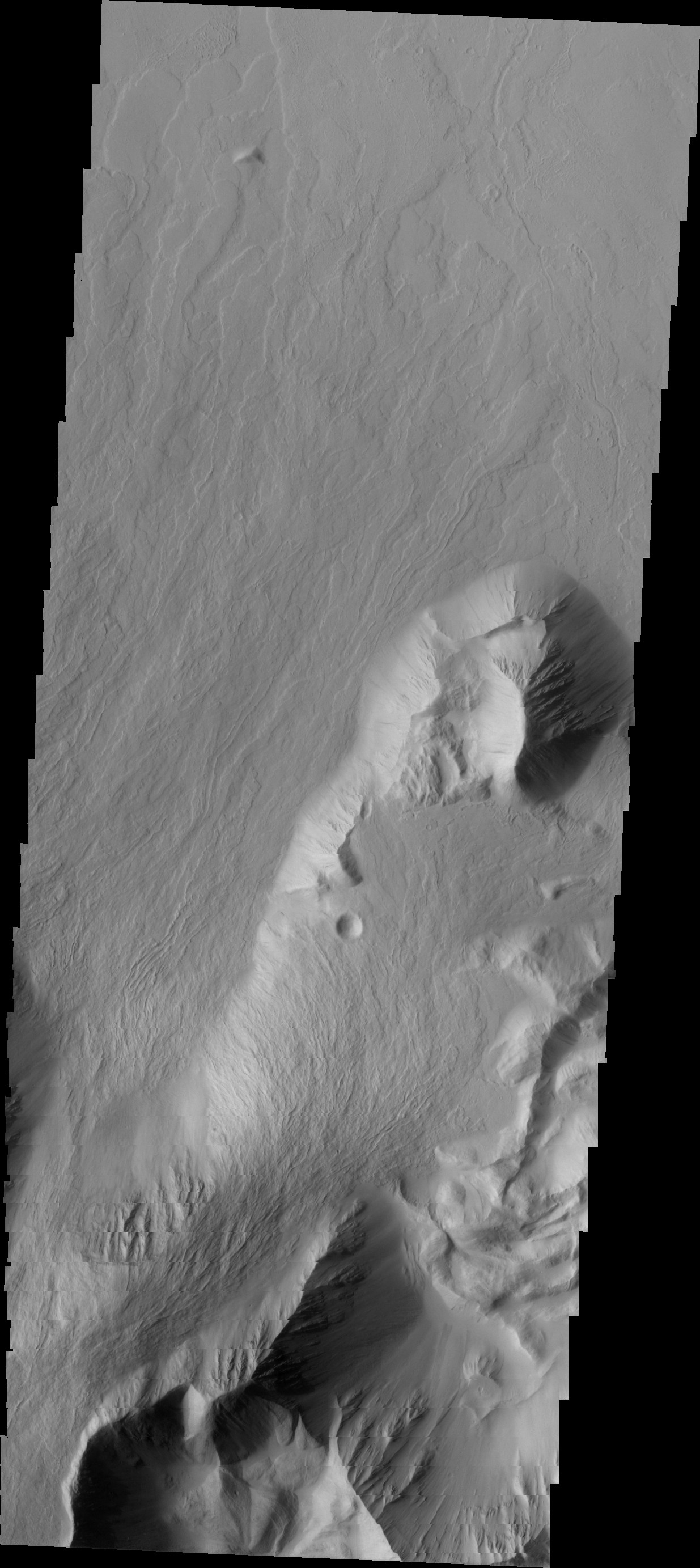
- Olympus Rupes as viewed by 2001 Mars Odyssey
- Feature type: Cliff
- Location: Olympus Mons
- Coordinates: 23.3869°N 227.083°E
- Discoverer: Mariner 9
- Eponym: Latin - Mount Olympus and rupes, Latin for "cliff"

Olympus Rupes is a group of cliffs along the northern face of Olympus Mons, the largest mountain on Mars and the largest volcano in the Solar System. It also forms the northern border of the mountain.
