= Olympus Mons =

Martian volcano, highest point on Mars

- Mars Express orbiter view of Olympus Mons with its summit caldera, escarpment, and aureole
- Feature type: Shield volcano
- Location: Western Tharsis Rise, Mars
- Coordinates: 18°39′N 226°12′E
- Width: 600 km (370 mi)
- Peak: 21.287 km (13.227 mi) above datum 21.665 km (13.462 mi), 21.9 km (13.6 mi) or 26 km (16 mi) local relief above plains
- Discoverer: Mariner 9
- Eponym: Latin – Mount Olympus

Olympus Mons (/əˌlɪmpəs ˈmɒnz, oʊ-/; Latin for 'Mount Olympus') is a large shield volcano on Mars. As measured by the Mars Orbiter Laser Altimeter (MOLA), it is 21.287 kilometres (69,840 ft) high, about 2.5 times the elevation of Mount Everest above sea level. It is Mars's tallest volcano, its tallest planetary mountain, and is approximately tied with Rheasilvia on Vesta as the tallest mountain currently discovered in the Solar System. It is associated with the volcanic region of Tharsis Montes. It last erupted 25 million years ago.

Olympus Mons is the youngest of the large volcanoes on Mars, having formed during the Martian Hesperian Period with eruptions continuing well into the Amazonian Period. It has been known to astronomers since the late 19th century as the albedo feature Nix Olympica (Latin for "Olympic Snow"), and its mountainous nature was suspected well before space probes confirmed it as a mountain.

Two impact craters on Olympus Mons have been assigned provisional names by the International Astronomical Union: the 15.6-kilometre-diameter (9.7 mi) Karzok crater and the 10.4-kilometre-diameter (6.5 mi) Pangboche crater. They are two of several suspected source areas for shergottites, the most abundant class of Martian meteorites.

== Description ==
Horizontal comparison of Olympus Mons with France

Vertical comparison of Olympus Mons with Mount Everest (shown sea-level-to-peak) and Mauna Kea on Earth (measurement is sea-level to peak, not base to peak)

As a shield volcano, Olympus Mons resembles the shape of the large volcanoes making up the Hawaiian Islands. The edifice is about 600 km (370 mi) wide. Because the mountain is so large, with complex structure at its edges, allocating a height to it is difficult. Olympus Mons stands nearly 22 kilometres (14 mi) above the Martian surface, growing to such heights primarily as a result of prolonged volcanic activity, weaker gravity, a lack of movement relative to the hotspot due to a lack of continental drift, and less intense weather systems that cause erosion. Its local relief, from the foot of the cliffs which form its northwest margin to its peak, is over 21 km (13 mi) (a little over twice the height of Mauna Kea as measured from its base on the ocean floor). The total elevation change from the plains of Amazonis Planitia, over 1,000 km (620 mi) to the northwest, to the summit approaches 26 km (16 mi). The summit of the mountain has six nested calderas (collapsed craters) forming an irregular depression 60 km (37 mi) × 80 km (50 mi) across and up to 3.2 km (2.0 mi) deep. The volcano's outer edge consists of an escarpment, or cliff, up to 8 km (5.0 mi) tall (although obscured by lava flows in places), a feature unique among the shield volcanoes of Mars, which may have been created by enormous flank landslides. Olympus Mons covers an area of about 300,000 km^{2} (120,000 sq mi), which is approximately the size of Italy or the Philippines, and it is supported by a 70 km (43 mi) thick lithosphere. The extraordinary size of Olympus Mons is likely because Mars lacks mobile tectonic plates. Unlike on Earth, the crust of Mars remains fixed over a stationary hotspot, and a volcano can continue to discharge lava until it reaches an enormous height.

Being a shield volcano, Olympus Mons has a very gently sloping profile. The average slope on the volcano's flanks is only 5%. Slopes are steepest near the middle part of the flanks and grow shallower toward the base, giving the flanks a concave upward profile. Its flanks are shallower and extend farther from the summit in the northwestern direction than they do to the southeast. The volcano's shape and profile have been likened to a "circus tent" held up by a single pole that is shifted off center.

Because of the size and shallow slopes of Olympus Mons, an observer standing on the Martian surface would be unable to view the entire profile of the volcano, even from a great distance. The curvature of the planet and the volcano itself would obscure such a synoptic view. Similarly, an observer near the summit would be unaware of standing on a very high mountain, as the slope of the volcano would extend far beyond the horizon, a mere 3 kilometers away.

The typical atmospheric pressure at the top of Olympus Mons is 72 pascals, about 12% of the average Martian surface pressure of 600 pascals. Both are exceedingly low by terrestrial standards; by comparison, the atmospheric pressure at the summit of Mount Everest is 32,000 pascals, or about 32% of Earth's sea level pressure. Even so, high-altitude orographic clouds frequently drift over the Olympus Mons summit, and airborne Martian dust is still present. Although the average Martian surface atmospheric pressure is less than one percent of Earth's, the much lower gravity of Mars increases the atmosphere's scale height; in other words, Mars's atmosphere is expansive and does not drop off in density with height as sharply as Earth's.

The composition of Olympus Mons is approximately 44% silicates, 17.5% iron oxides (which give the planet its red coloration), 7% aluminium, 6% magnesium, 6% calcium, and particularly high proportions of sulfur dioxide with 7%. These results point to the surface being largely composed of basalts and other mafic rocks, which would have erupted as low viscosity lava flows and hence lead to the low gradients on the surface of the planet.

== Geology ==
Olympus Mons is the result of many thousands of highly fluid, basaltic lava flows that poured from volcanic vents over a long period of time (the Hawaiian Islands exemplify similar shield volcanoes on a smaller scale – see Mauna Kea). Like the basalt volcanoes on Earth, Martian basaltic volcanoes are capable of erupting enormous quantities of ash. Due to the reduced gravity of Mars compared to Earth, there are lesser buoyant forces on the magma rising out of the crust. In addition, the magma chambers are thought to be much larger and deeper than the ones found on Earth. The flanks of Olympus Mons are made up of innumerable lava flows and channels. Many of the flows have levees along their margins (pictured). The cooler, outer margins of the flow solidify, leaving a central trough of molten, flowing lava. Partially collapsed lava tubes are visible as chains of pit craters, and broad lava fans formed by lava emerging from intact, subsurface tubes are also common. In places along the volcano's base, solidified lava flows can be seen spilling out into the surrounding plains, forming broad aprons, and burying the basal escarpment. Crater counts from high-resolution images taken by the Mars Express orbiter in 2004 indicate that lava flows on the northwestern flank of Olympus Mons range in age from 115 million years old (Mya) to only 2 Mya. These ages are very recent in geological terms, suggesting that the mountain may still be volcanically active, though in a very quiescent and episodic fashion.

The caldera complex at the peak of the volcano is made of at least six overlapping calderas and caldera segments (pictured). Calderas are formed by roof collapse following depletion and withdrawal of the subsurface magma chamber after an eruption. Each caldera thus represents a separate pulse of volcanic activity on the mountain. The largest and oldest caldera segment appears to have formed as a single, large lava lake. Using geometric relationships of caldera dimensions from laboratory models, scientists have estimated that the magma chamber associated with the largest caldera on Olympus Mons lies at a depth of about 32 km (105,000 ft) below the caldera floor. Crater size-frequency distributions on the caldera floors indicate the calderas range in age from 350 Mya to about 150 Mya. All probably formed within 100 million years of each other. It is possible that the magma chambers within Olympus Mons received new magma from the mantle after the caldera floors formed, leading to the inflation of each chamber and uplift of parts of the volcano summit.

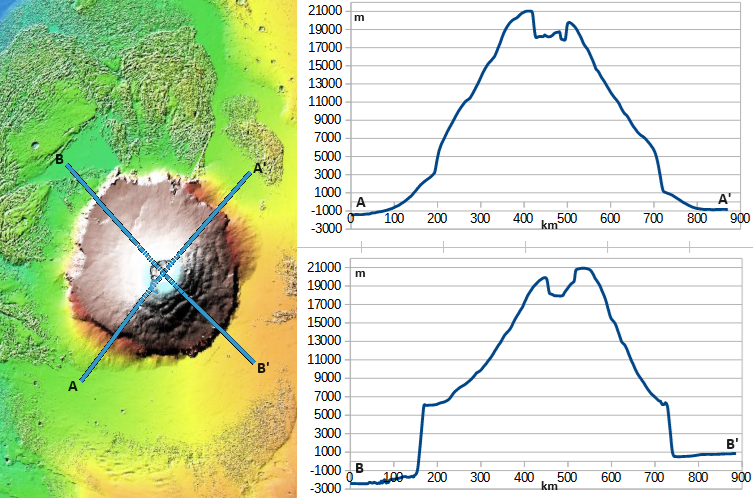
Elevation profiles of Olympus Mons along SW-to-NE and NW-to-SE transects across the mountain. Created with Mars Quickmap.

Olympus Mons is structurally and topographically asymmetrical. The longer, more shallow northwestern flank displays extensional features, such as large slumps and normal faults. In contrast, the volcano's steeper southeastern side has features indicating compression, including step-like terraces in the volcano's mid-flank region (interpreted as thrust faults) and a number of wrinkle ridges located at the basal escarpment. Why opposite sides of the mountain should show different styles of deformation may lie in how large shield volcanoes grow laterally and in how variations within the volcanic substrate have affected the mountain's final shape.

Large shield volcanoes grow not only by adding material to their flanks as erupted lava, but also by spreading laterally at their bases. As a volcano grows in size, the stress field underneath the volcano changes from compressional to extensional. A subterranean rift may develop at the base of the volcano, causing the underlying crust to spread apart. If the volcano rests on sediments containing mechanically weak layers (e.g., beds of water-saturated clay), detachment zones (décollements) may develop in the weak layers. The extensional stresses in the detachment zones can produce giant landslides and normal faults on the volcano's flanks, leading to the formation of a basal escarpment. Further from the volcano, these detachment zones can express themselves as a succession of overlapping, gravity driven thrust faults. This mechanism has long been cited as an explanation of the Olympus Mons aureole deposits (discussed below).

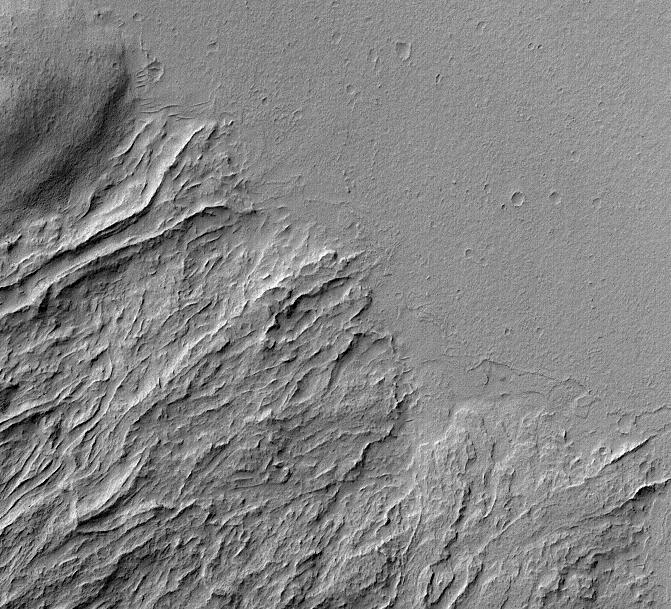
Mars Global Surveyor image showing lava flows of different ages at the base of Olympus Mons. The flat plain is the younger flow. The older flow has lava channels with levees along the edges. Levees are quite common to lava flows on Mars.

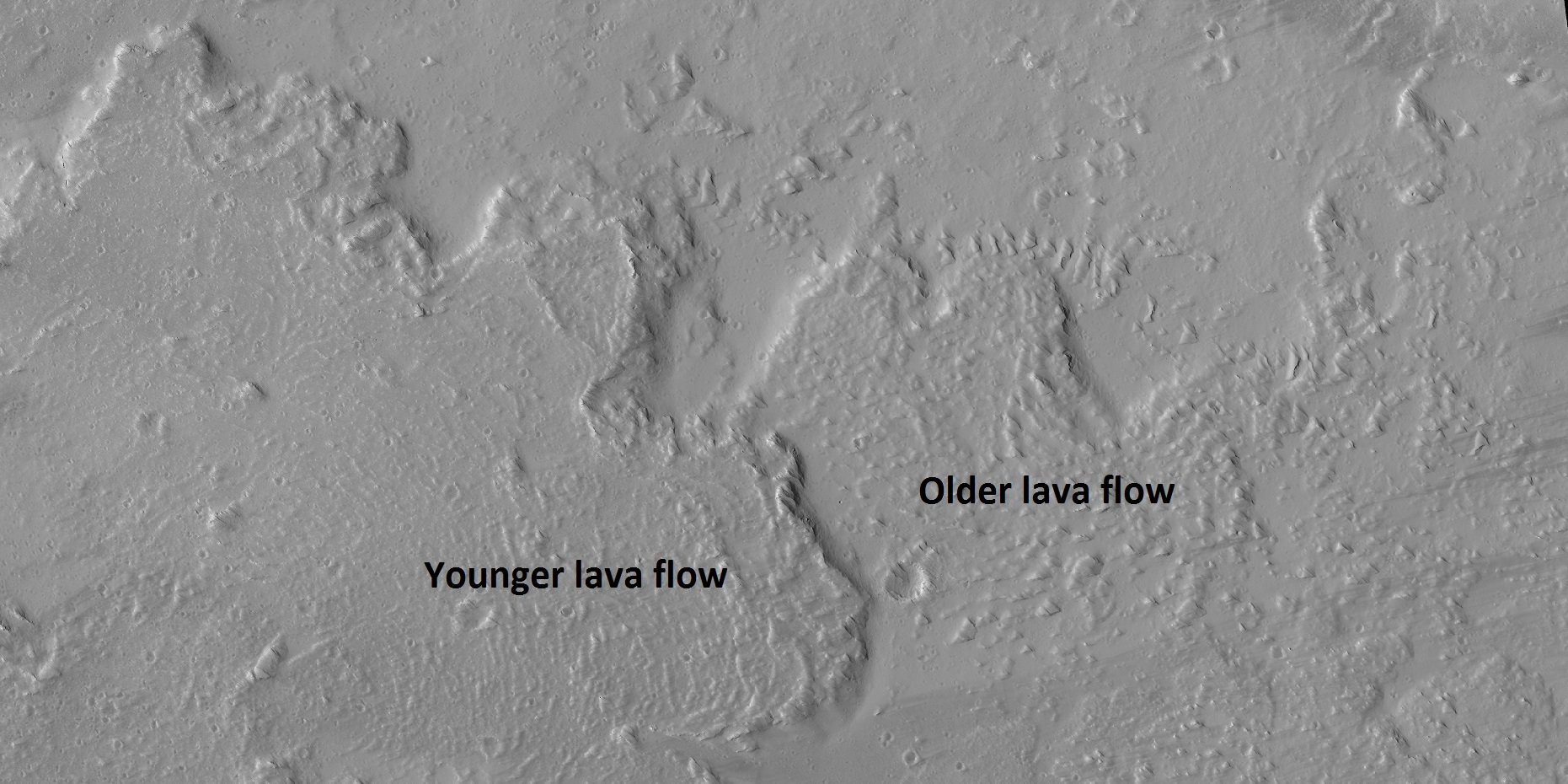
Lava flows on Olympus Mons with older and younger flows labeled, as viewed by HiRISE during the HiWish program

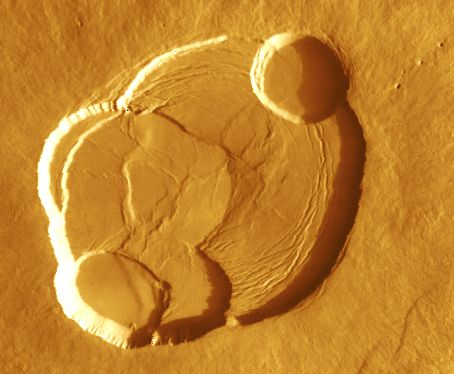
Calderas on the summit of Olympus Mons. The youngest calderas form circular collapse craters. Older calderas appear as semicircular segments because they are transected by the younger calderas.

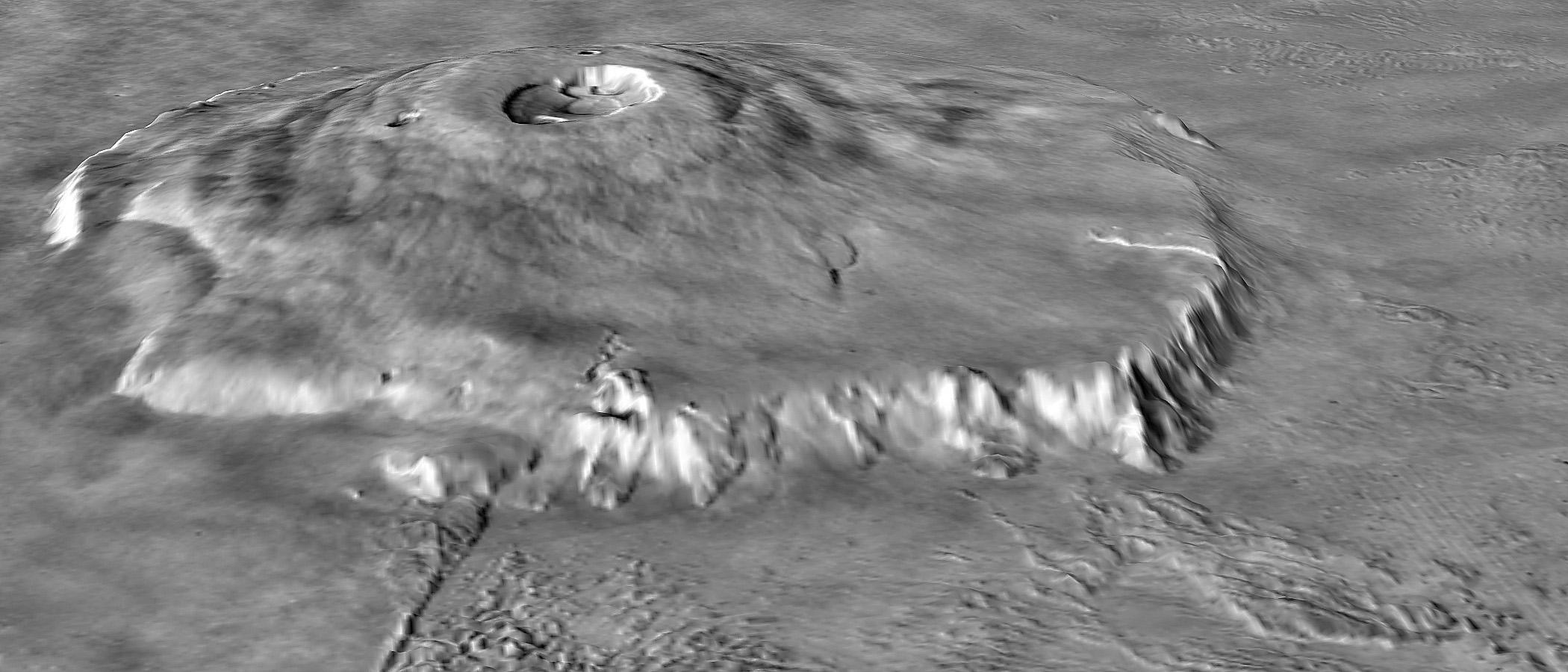
Oblique view of Olympus Mons, from a Viking image mosaic overlain on MOLA altimetry data, showing the volcano's asymmetry. The view is from the NNE; vertical exaggeration is 10×. The wider, gently sloping northern flank is to the right. The more narrow and steeply sloping southern flank (left) has low, rounded terraces, features interpreted as thrust faults. The volcano's basal escarpment is prominent.

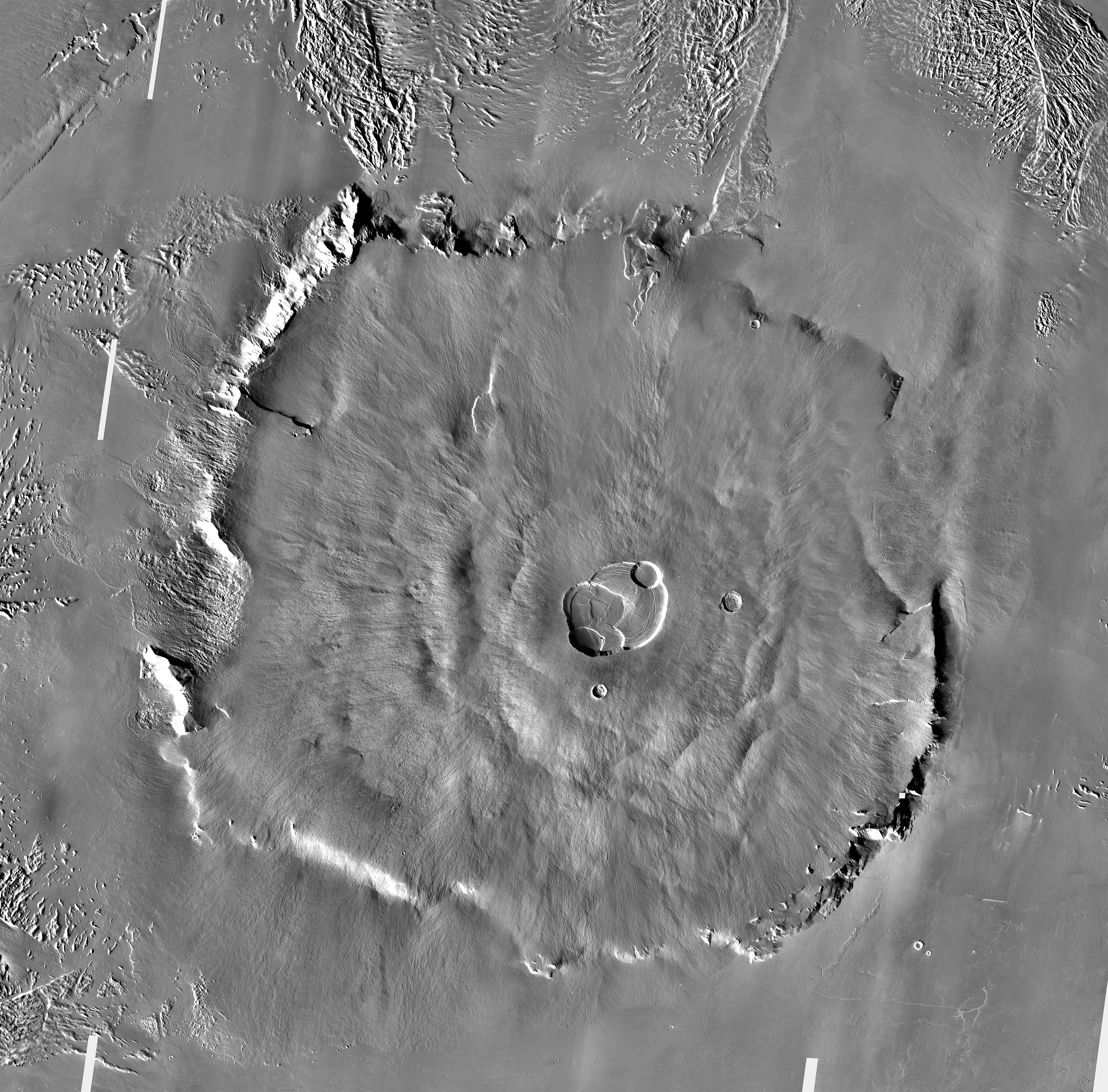
Detailed THEMIS daytime infrared image mosaic of Olympus Mons

Olympus Mons lies at the edge of the Tharsis bulge, an ancient vast volcanic plateau most likely formed by the end of the Noachian Period. During the Hesperian, when Olympus Mons began to form, the volcano was located on a shallow slope that descended from the high in Tharsis into the northern lowland basins. Over time, these basins received large volumes of sediment eroded from Tharsis and the southern highlands. The sediments likely contained abundant Noachian-aged phyllosilicates (clays) formed during an early period on Mars when surface water was abundant, and were thickest in the northwest where basin depth was greatest. As the volcano grew through lateral spreading, low-friction detachment zones preferentially developed in the thicker sediment layers to the northwest, creating the basal escarpment and widespread lobes of aureole material (Lycus Sulci). Spreading also occurred to the southeast; however, it was more constrained in that direction by the Tharsis rise, which presented a higher-friction zone at the volcano's base. Friction was higher in that direction because the sediments were thinner and probably consisted of coarser grained material resistant to sliding. The competent and rugged basement rocks of Tharsis acted as an additional source of friction. This inhibition of southeasterly basal spreading in Olympus Mons could account for the structural and topographic asymmetry of the mountain. Numerical models of particle dynamics involving lateral differences in friction along the base of Olympus Mons have been shown to reproduce the volcano's present shape and asymmetry fairly well.

It has been speculated that the detachment along the weak layers was aided by the presence of high-pressure water in the sediment pore spaces, which would have interesting astrobiological implications. If water-saturated zones still exist in sediments under the volcano, they would likely have been kept warm by a high geothermal gradient and residual heat from the volcano's magma chamber. Potential springs or seeps around the volcano would offer many possibilities for detecting microbial life.

== Early observations and naming ==
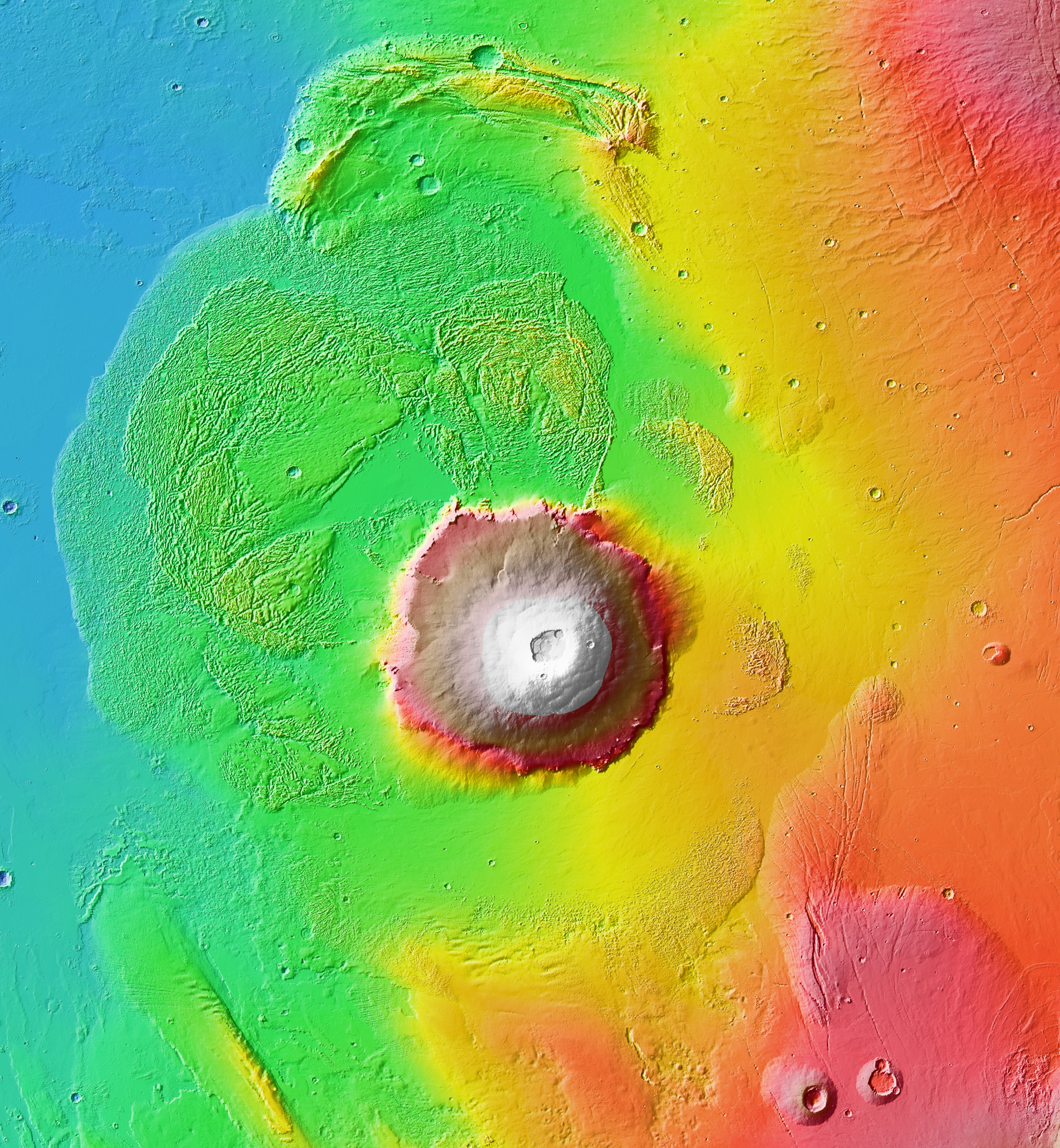
Colorized topographic map of Olympus Mons and its surrounding aureole, from the MOLA instrument of Mars Global Surveyor

Olympus Mons and a few other volcanoes in the Tharsis region stand high enough to reach above the frequent Martian dust-storms recorded by telescopic observers as early as the 19th century. The astronomer Patrick Moore pointed out that Schiaparelli (1835–1910) "had found that his Nodus Gordis and Olympic Snow [Nix Olympica] were almost the only features to be seen" during dust storms, and "guessed correctly that they must be high".

The Mariner 9 spacecraft arrived in orbit around Mars in 1971 during a global dust-storm. The first objects to become visible as the dust began to settle, the tops of the Tharsis volcanoes, demonstrated that the altitude of these features greatly exceeded that of any mountain found on Earth, as astronomers expected. Observations of the planet from Mariner 9 confirmed that Nix Olympica was a volcano. Ultimately, astronomers adopted the name Olympus Mons for the albedo feature known as Nix Olympica.

== Regional setting and surrounding features ==
Olympus Rupes, the northern part of Olympus Mons

Mt.Olympus Mons is located between the northwestern edge of the Tharsis region and the eastern edge of Amazonis Planitia. It stands about 1,200 km (750 mi) from the other three large Martian shield volcanoes, collectively called the Tharsis Montes (Arsia Mons, Pavonis Mons, and Ascraeus Mons). The Tharsis Montes are slightly smaller than Olympus Mons.

A wide, annular depression or moat about 2 km (1.2 mi) deep surrounds the base of Olympus Mons and is thought to be due to the volcano's immense weight pressing down on the Martian crust. The depth of this depression is greater on the northwest side of the mountain than on the southeast side.

Olympus Mons is partially surrounded by a region of distinctive grooved or corrugated terrain known as the Olympus Mons aureole. The aureole consists of several large lobes. Northwest of the volcano, the aureole extends a distance of up to 750 km (470 mi) and is known as Lycus Sulci (24°36′N 219°00′E). East of Olympus Mons, the aureole is partially covered by lava flows, but where it is exposed it goes by different names (Gigas Sulci, for example). The origin of the aureole remains debated, but it was likely formed by huge landslides or gravity-driven thrust sheets that sloughed off the edges of the Olympus Mons shield.

== See also ==
- Areography (geography of Mars) – Delineation and characterization of Martian regions
- Cydonia (Mars) – Area of Mars
- Geology of Mars – Geology of fourth planet from the Sun
- List of mountains on Mars – Named mountains of Mars
- List of tallest mountains in the Solar System
- Tharsis – Volcanic plateau on Mars
- True polar wander on Mars – Fluctuation in location of Martian poles
- Volcanism on Mars – Past Geological Phenomenon on Mars
