= Amazonis Planitia =

Planitia on Mars

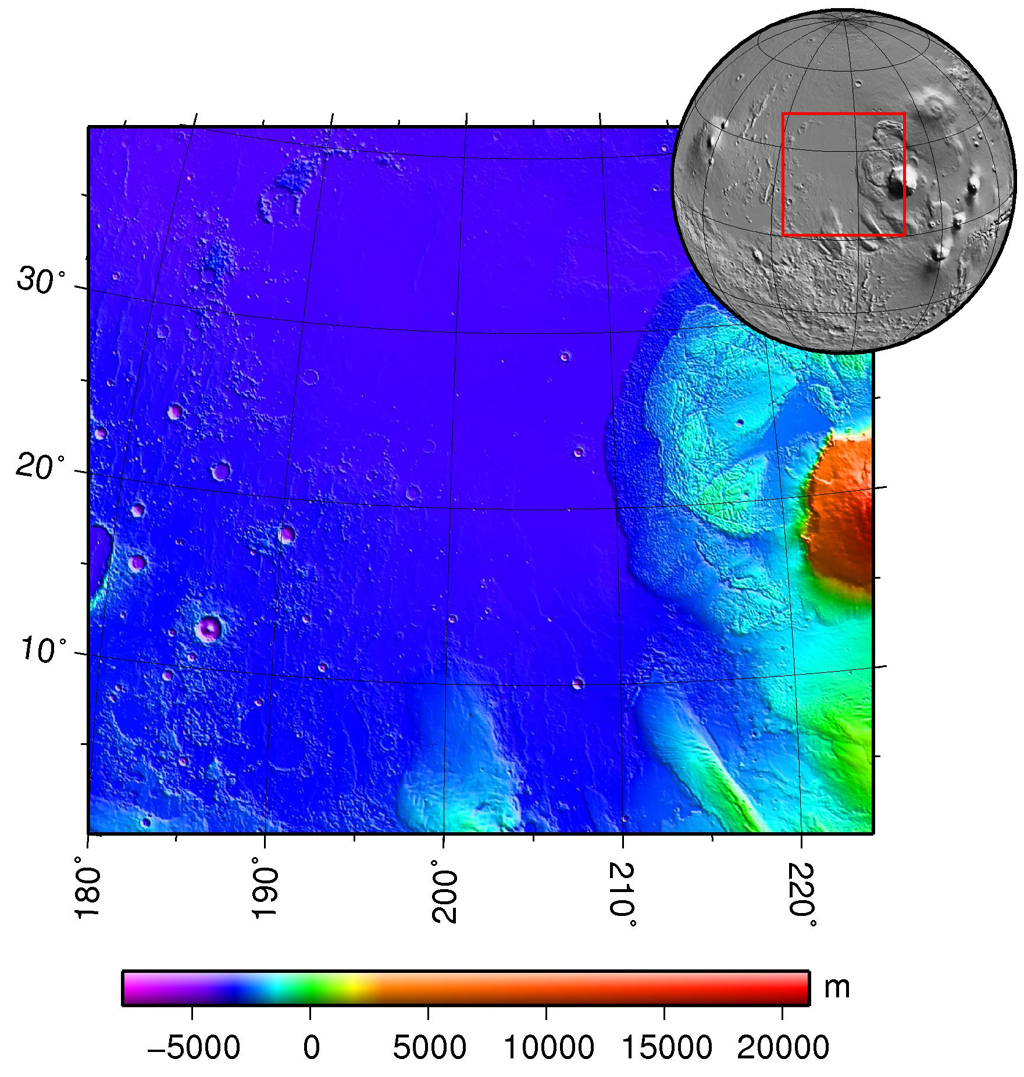
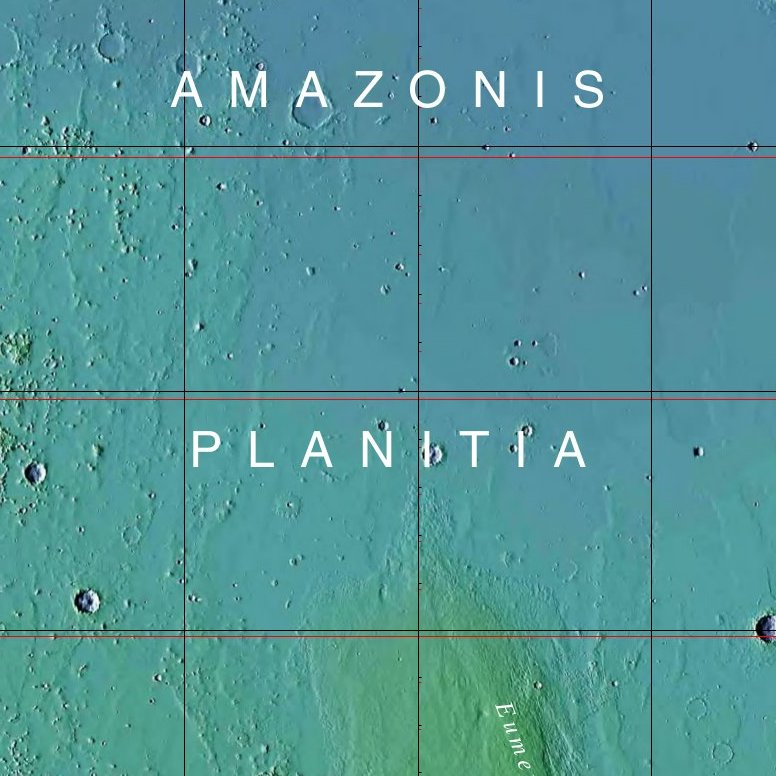
- Topographic map of Amazonis Planitia. MOLA colorized relief map of Amazonis Planitia. Colors indicate elevation, with red highest, yellow intermediate, and green/blue lowest.
- Coordinates: 24.8°N 196.0°E

Amazonis Planitia (/əˈmæzənɪs pləˈnɪʃiə/, Latin Amāzŏnis) is one of the smoothest plains on Mars. It is located between the Tharsis and Elysium volcanic provinces, to the west of Olympus Mons, in the Amazonis and Memnonia quadrangles, centered at 24.8°N 196.0°E. The plain's topography exhibits extremely smooth features at several different lengths of scale. A large part of the Medusae Fossae Formation lies in Amazonis Planitia.

Its name derives from one of the classical albedo features observed by early astronomers, which was in turn named after the Amazons, a mythical race of warrior women.

== Age and composition ==
Only approximately 100 million years old, these plains provide some of the fewest sedimentary layers impeding viewing of the Martian terrain, and closely resemble the composition of Iceland. Formed by free-flowing lava across great plains, Amazonis has been described by William Hartmann as a "bright dusty volcanic desert crossed by many fresh-looking lava flows."

Amazonis has become the primary focus of modern research efforts both because of its geological composition and because of its relative youth compared to other Martian regions, which are often hundreds of millions of years older. Hartmann writes that the plain closely resembles Iceland's surface, with its "strange cobweb-like networks of ridges and crags [on both planets, divide] smoother areas into a pattern something like fragments of a broken plate." Both land masses' shapes have been formed by lava flows from volcanic eruptions, causing both surfaces to be covered by a thick layer of hardened lava. Findings from aerial footage of both Amazonis and Iceland have shown nearly identical terrain patterns, signifying the comparative ages of the two regions.

The entire contemporary era on Mars has been named the Amazonian Epoch because researchers originally believed Amazonis Planitia to be representative of all Martian plains. Instead, over the past two decades, researchers have realized that the area's youth and smooth surface distinguish the area from its neighbors.

Although the full implications of Amazonis's youth have not yet been determined, the nature of the area (i.e. lack of sedimentary rock) has at least provided researchers evidence that the areas are the most likely to provide future discoveries, and as such, has been proposed as a future site for most NASA landings.

== See also ==
- Dark slope streaks
- Geography of Mars
- List of plains on Mars
- Medusae Fossae Formation
