= Măgurele, Prahova =

Măgurele
- Commune
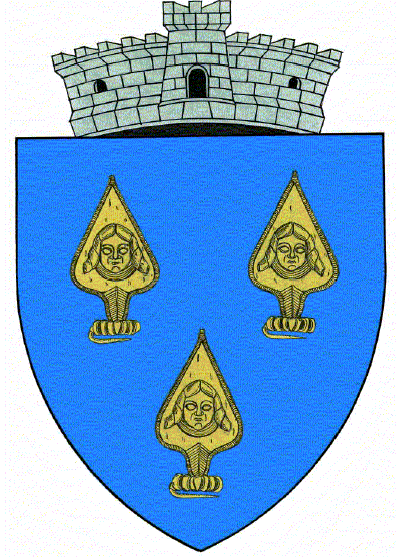
- Coat of arms

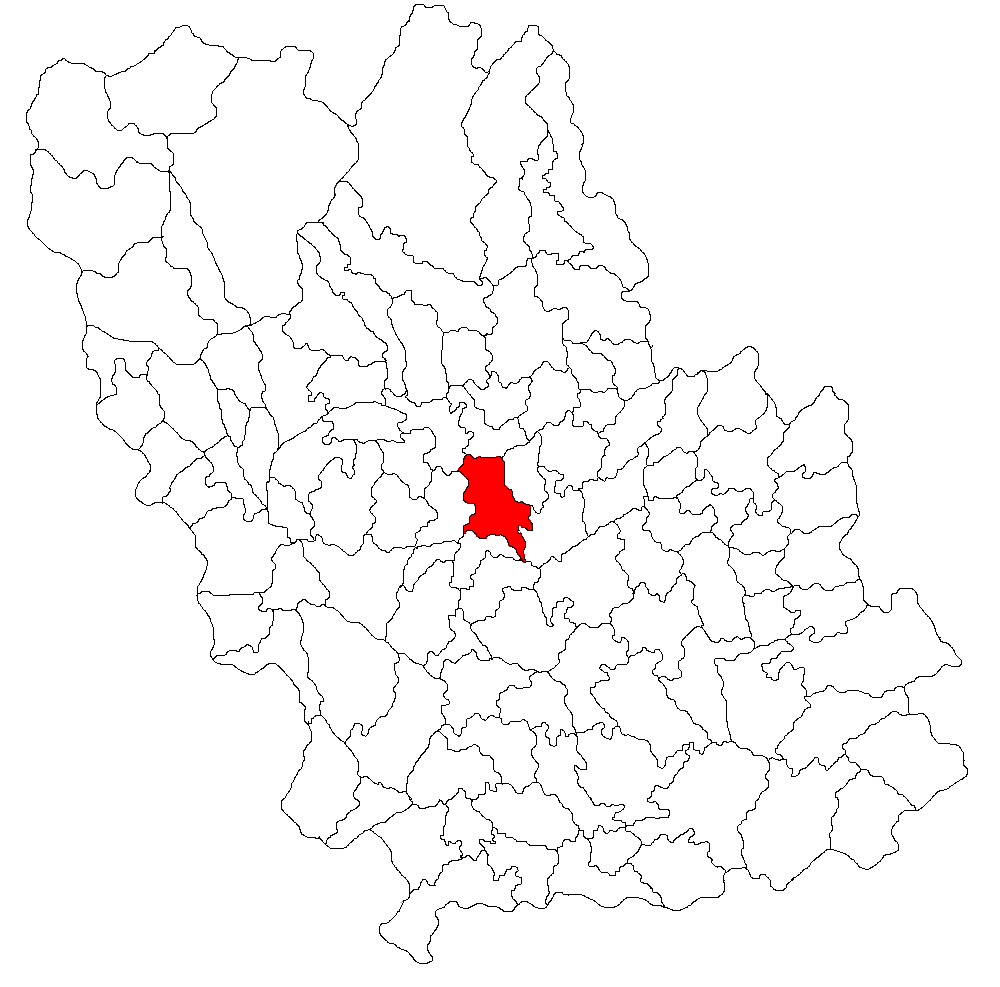
- Location in Prahova County

- Location in Romania
- Coordinates: 45°05′41″N 26°02′13″E
- Country: Romania
- County: Prahova

Government
  - Mayor (2024–2028): Vasilică Diaconu (PNL)
- Area: 27.47 km^{2} (10.61 sq mi)
- Elevation: 256 m (840 ft)
- Population (2021-12-01): 4,444
  - Density: 160/km^{2} (420/sq mi)
- Time zone: EET/EEST (UTC+2/+3)
- Postal code: 107345
- Area code: +(40) 244
- Vehicle reg.: PH
- Website: magurele-ph.ro

Măgurele is a commune in Prahova County, Muntenia, Romania. It is composed of three villages: Coada Malului, Iazu, and Măgurele.

Historical population
Year	Pop.	±%
1992	4,711	—
2002	4,889	+3.8%
2011	4,749	−2.9%
2021	4,444	−6.4%
Source: Census data
