= Scânteia, Ialomița =

Scânteia
- Commune
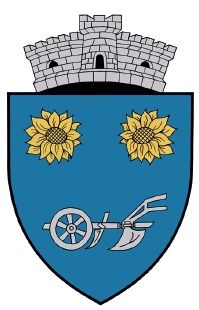
- Coat of arms

- Location in Ialomița County

- Location in Romania
- Coordinates: 44°44′N 27°27′E
- Country: Romania
- County: Ialomița

Government
  - Mayor (2024–2028): Georgeta Ilie (PSD)
- Elevation: 33 m (108 ft)
- Population (2021-12-01): 3,360
- Time zone: UTC+02:00 (EET)
  - Summer (DST): UTC+03:00 (EEST)
- Postal code: 927210
- Area code: +(40) 243
- Vehicle reg.: IL
- Website: www.primariascanteia.ro

Scânteia is a commune located in Ialomița County, Muntenia, Romania. It is composed of two villages, Iazu and Scânteia.

Historical population
Year	Pop.	±%
1899	1,046	—
1925	3,243	+210.0%
2002	4,364	+34.6%
2011	3,851	−11.8%
2021	3,360	−12.7%
Source: Census data
