= Cojasca =

- Commune
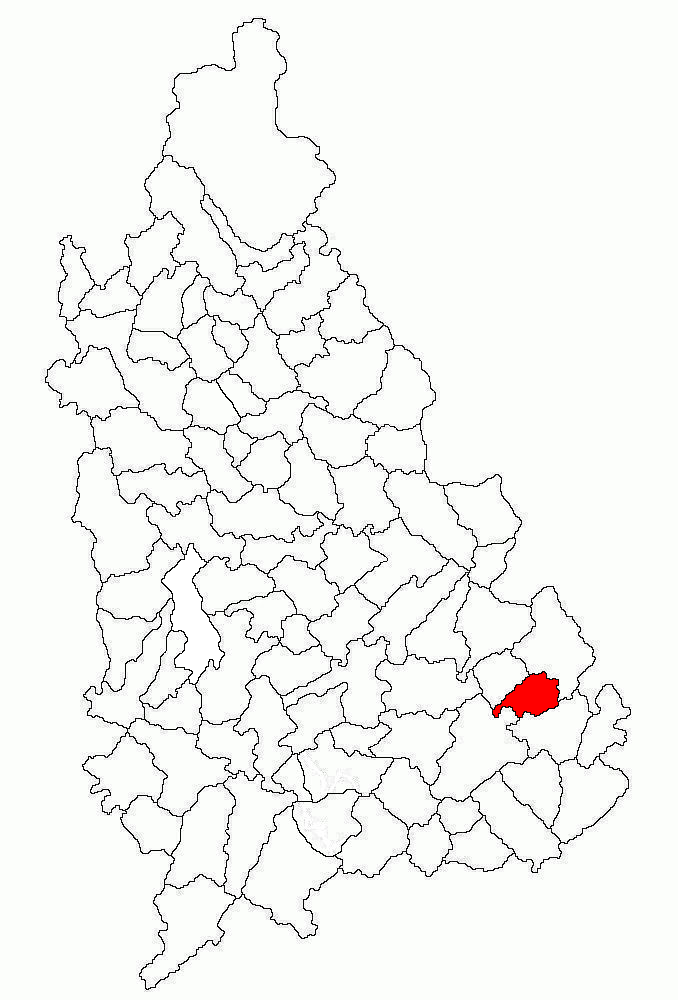
- Location in Dâmbovița County

- Location in Romania
- Coordinates: 44°43′N 25°51′E
- Country: Romania
- County: Dâmbovița

Government
  - Mayor (2024–2028): Marcel Bamboi (PNL)
- Area: 22.59 km^{2} (8.72 sq mi)
- Elevation: 135 m (443 ft)
- Population (2021-12-01): 8,025
  - Density: 360/km^{2} (920/sq mi)
- Time zone: EET/EEST (UTC+2/+3)
- Postal code: 137115
- Area code: +(40) 245
- Vehicle reg.: DB
- Website: www.primariacojasca.ro

Cojasca is a commune in Dâmbovița County, Muntenia, Romania. It is composed of three villages: Cojasca, Fântânele, and Iazu.

Historical population
Year	Pop.	±%
2002	7,286	—
2011	8,276	+13.6%
2021	8,025	−3.0%
Source: Census data

At the 2011 census, the commune had 8,276 inhabitants, of which 77.8% were Roma and 22.2% Romanians. At the 2021 census, Cojasca had a population of 8,025; of those, 55.15% were Roma and 27.28% Romanians.
