= Lycus Sulci =

Region on Mars

- Lycus Sulci, as seen by THEMIS.
- Coordinates: 24.6°N 141.1°W

Lycus Sulci is a feature in the Amazonis quadrangle on Mars, with its location centered at 24.6° north latitude and 141.1° west longitude. It is 1,350 km long and is named after a classical albedo feature name. The term "sulci" is applied to subparallel furrows and ridges.

== Gallery ==
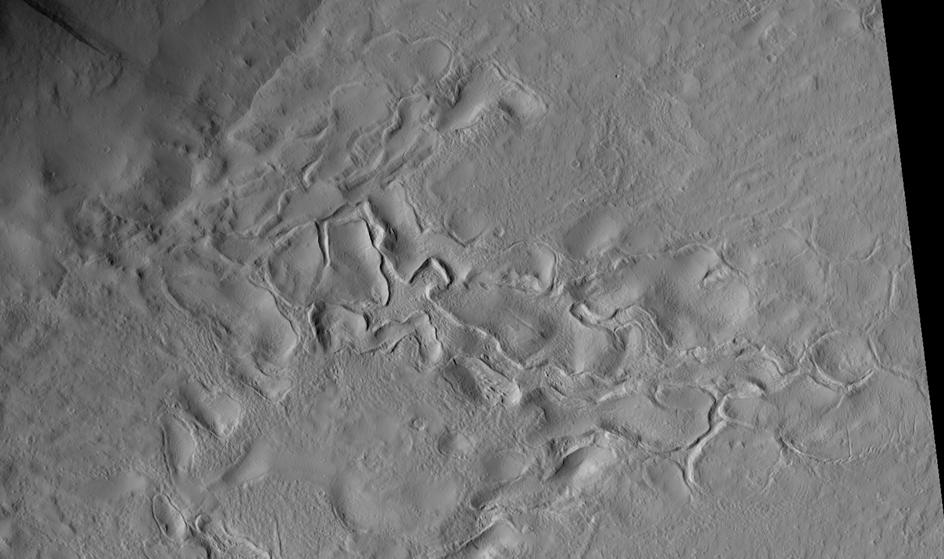
Surface features of Lycus Sulci, as seen by HiRISE under the HiWish program.

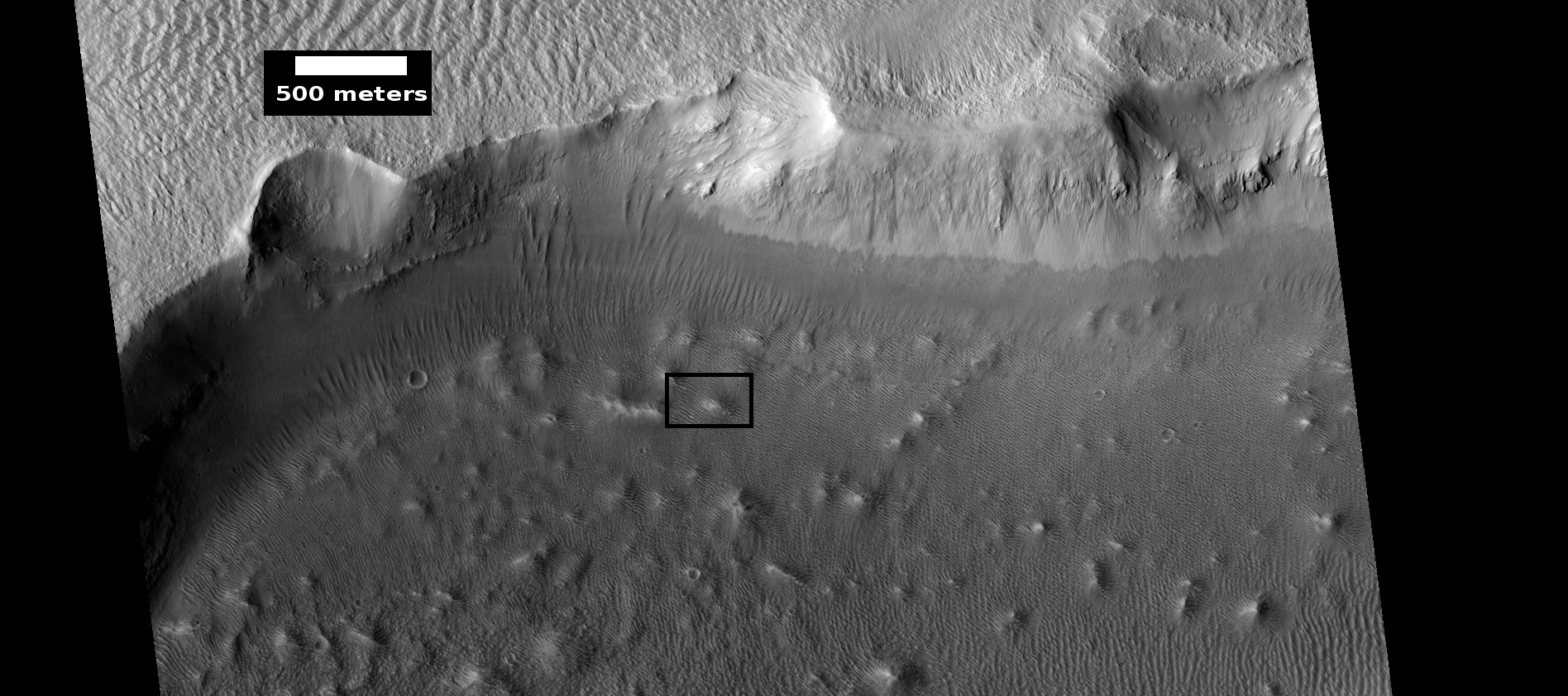
Crater wall and floor in Lycus Sulci, as seen by HiRISE under HiWish program. The crater floor contains many mounds and ridges. The part in the box is enlarged in the next photo.

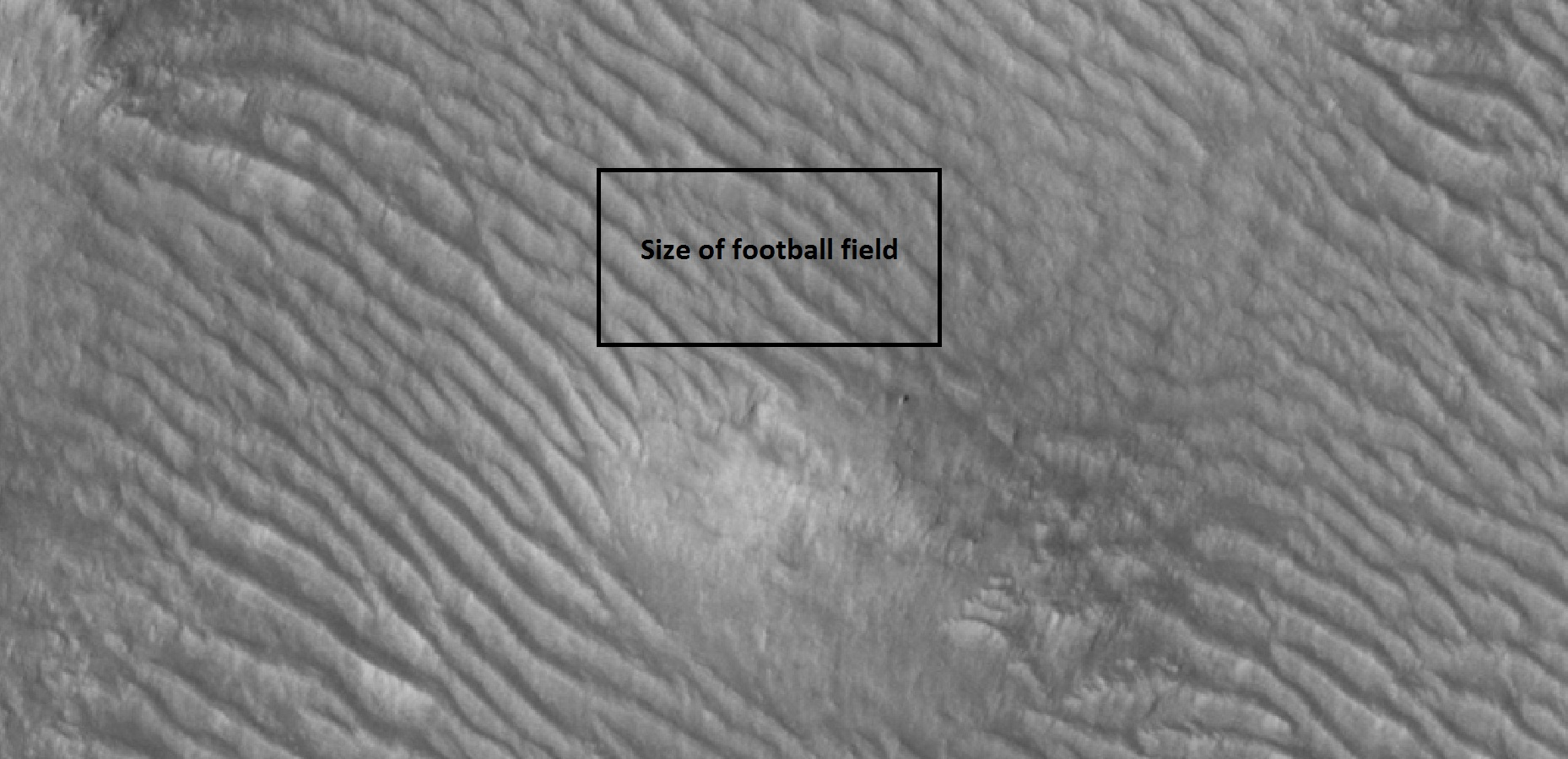
Close-up of a mound and ridges, as seen by HiRISE under HiWish program.

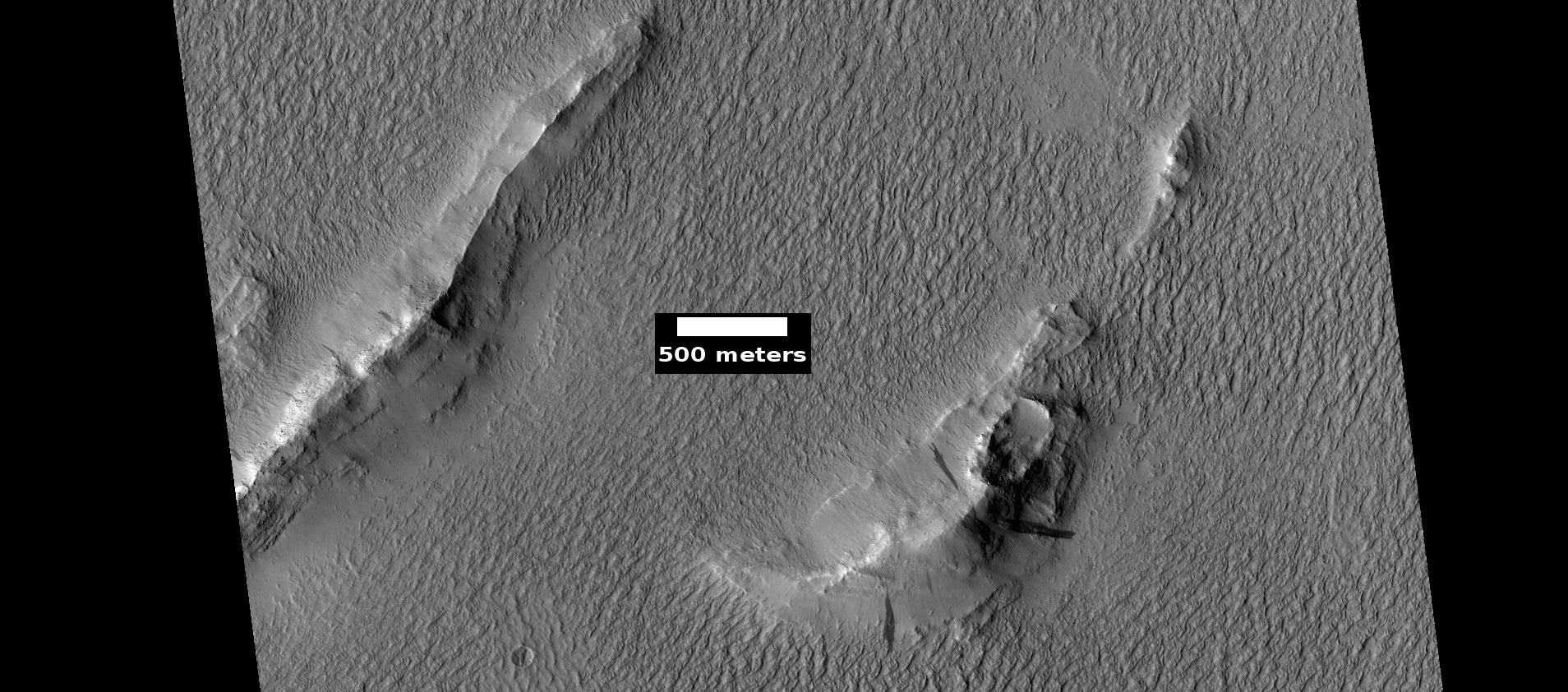
Layers and dark slope streaks in Lycus Sulci, as seen by HiRISE under HiWish program

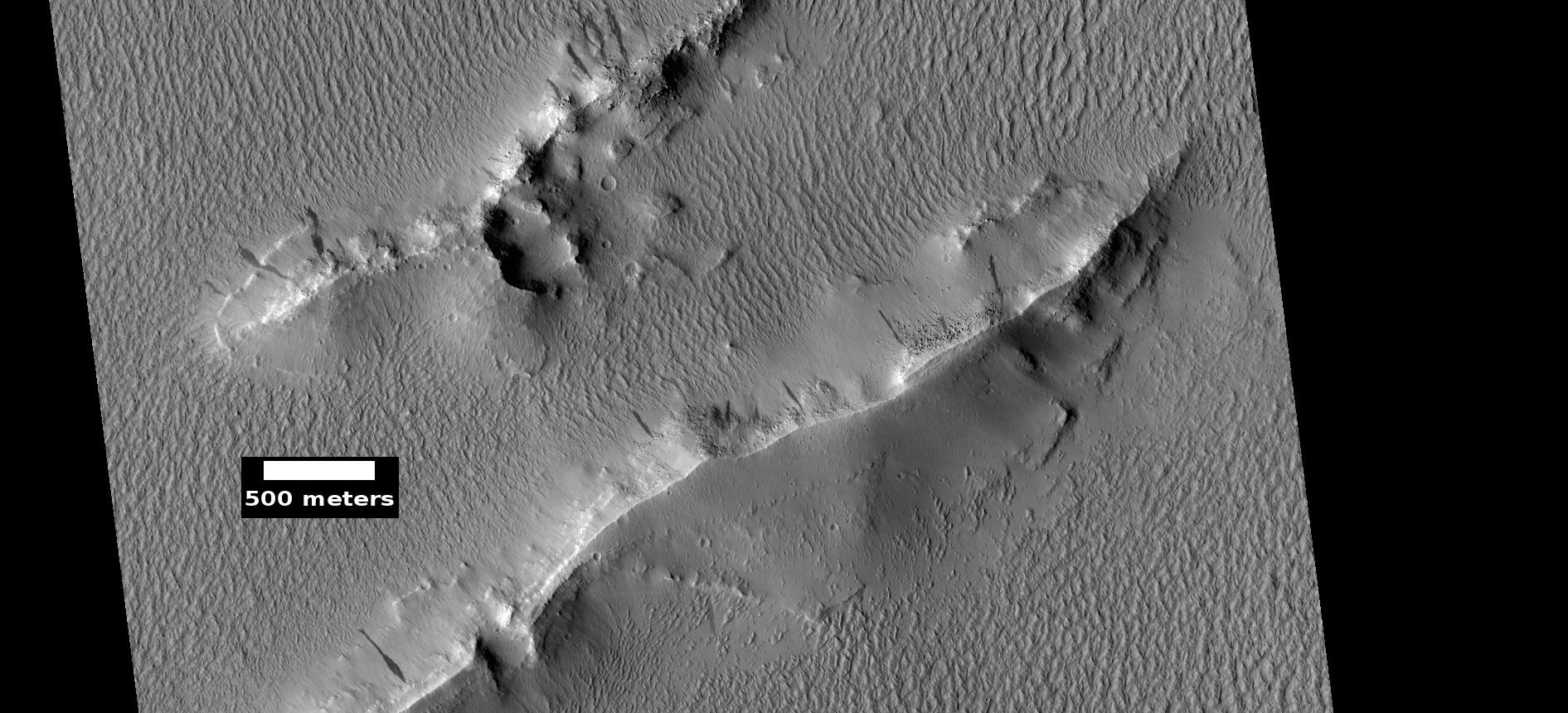
Layers and dark slope streaks in Lycus Sulci, as seen by HiRISE under HiWish program
