= Cape Tribulation (Mars) =

Feature of Endeavour crater on Mars

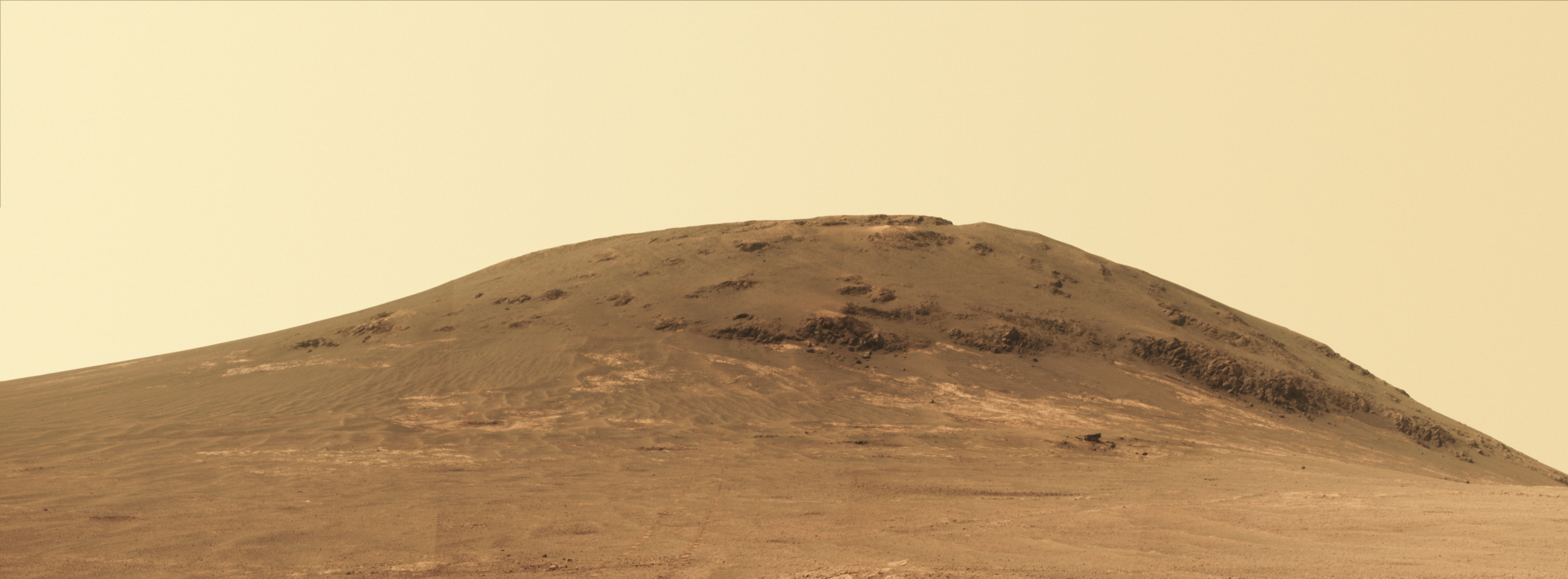
Looking north at the southern end of Cape Tribulation (MER-B, 2017)

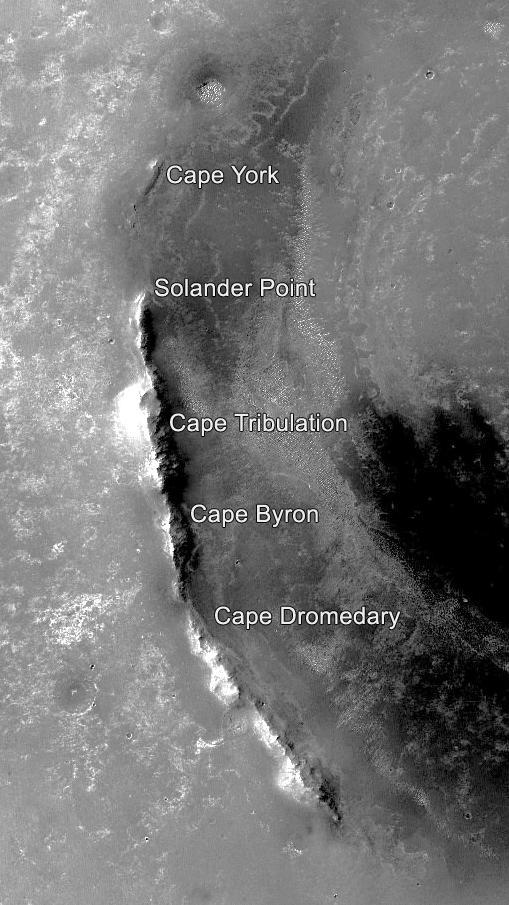
Annotated map with location of Cape Tribulation, on Endeavour crater's western rim

Cape Tribulation is a section of the Western rim of Endeavour crater on the planet Mars. The MER-B Opportunity rover spent 30 months exploring Cape Tribulation from 2014 to 2017. The top of Cape Tribulation is about 134 meters (440 feet) higher than the plains that surround the crater.

The MER-B Opportunity rover summited Cape Tribulation in January 2015, which was the highest Martian elevation achieved yet on its mission. Then in March 2016 it accomplished the distance of a classic marathon. Also in March 2016 it achieved the steepest slope traverse (32 degree) yet of its mission, surpassing the slope it took on at Burns Cliff in 2004. MER-B was trying to reach a target on Knudsen Ridge, on the south side of Marathon Valley, which meant attempting a steep grade which can cause wheel slippage. Another effect of this angle was that sand and dust that had collected on the rover flowed in streaks over the back of the rover, such was the incline.

Examples of locations:

- Cape Tribulation Summit
- Marathon Valley
  - Knudsen ridge
  - Wharton Ridge
- Spirit of Saint Lois Crater
- Spirit Mount

Endeavour crater is a 14-mile (23 km) wide crater on Mars, that was explored by the MER-B Rover Opportunity in the 2010s, after landing on the planet in 2004.

== Naming ==
Cape Tribulation is a reference to one of the locations visited by HMS Endeavour captained by James Cook in his first voyage of discovery to Australia and New Zealand in 1769-1771.

— NASA

== Wdowiak Ridge ==
Wdowiak Ridge is a section of the Western rim and is a raised section about 500 feet (150 meters) long and about 40 feet (12 meters) above surroundings.

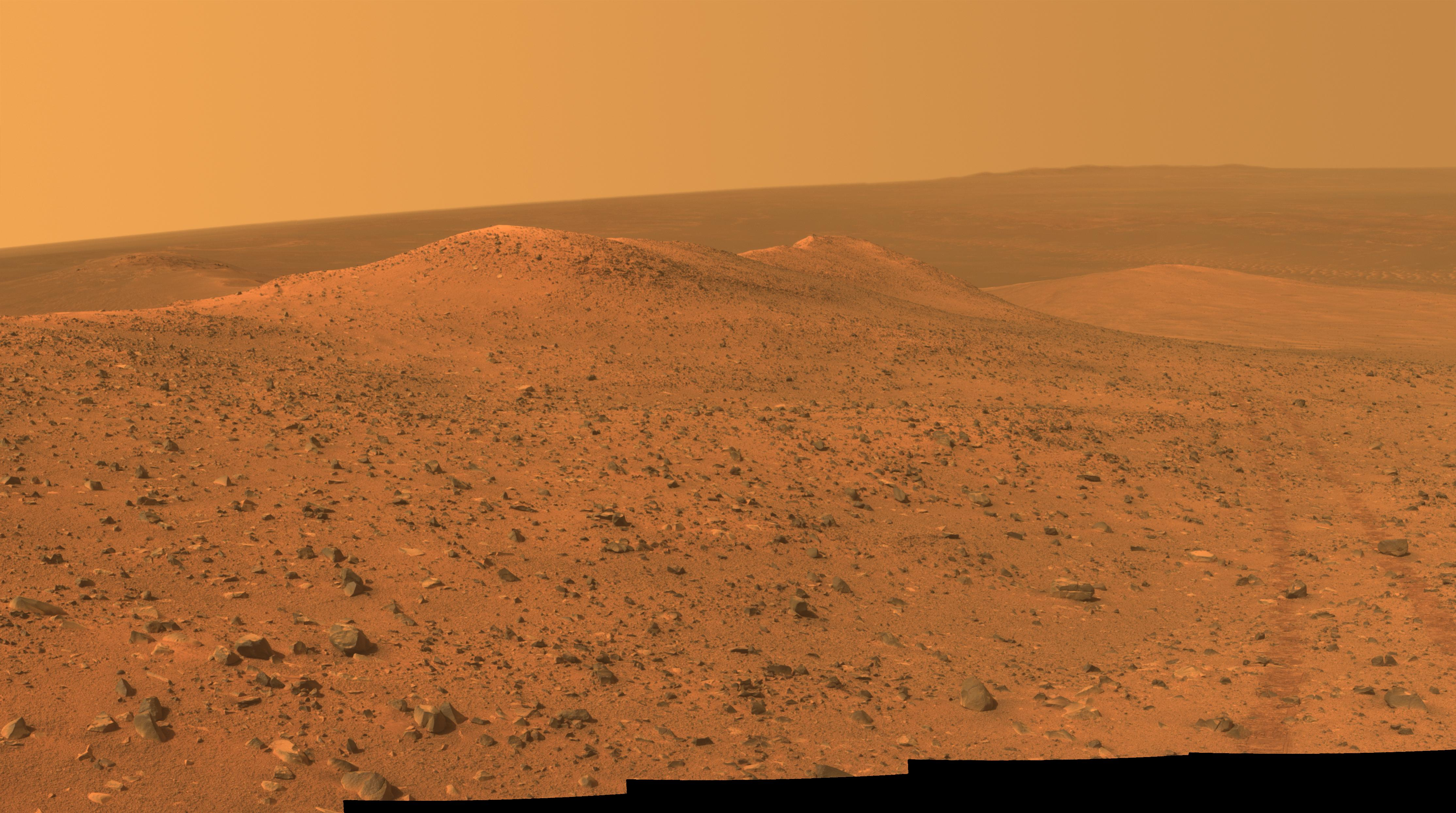
Wdowiak Ridge on the North-Western rim of Endeavour crater.MER-B recorded this panorama on Sept. 17, 2014 (Sol 3,786)

== Summit ==
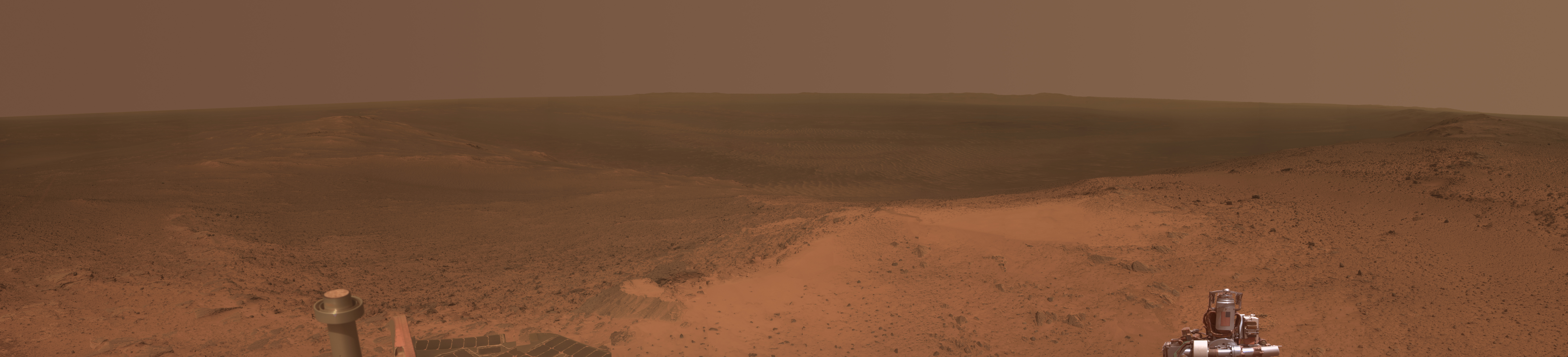
Opportunity's view from the top of Cape Tribulation on the rim of Endeavour Crater, January 22, 2015.

On Sol 3894 (Jan. 6, 2015) Opportunity reached the summit of "Cape Tribulation," which is 443 feet (135 meters) above "Botany Bay" level and the highest point reached by the rover on Endeavour Crater's western rim, according to NASA.

== Marathon valley ==
In 2015 MER-B entered Marathon Valley in Cape Tribulation and would study it until September 2016.

Marathon Valley was targeted for exploration by MER-B because CRISM instrument in orbit on the Mars Reconnaissance Orbiter detected clay minerals at this location.

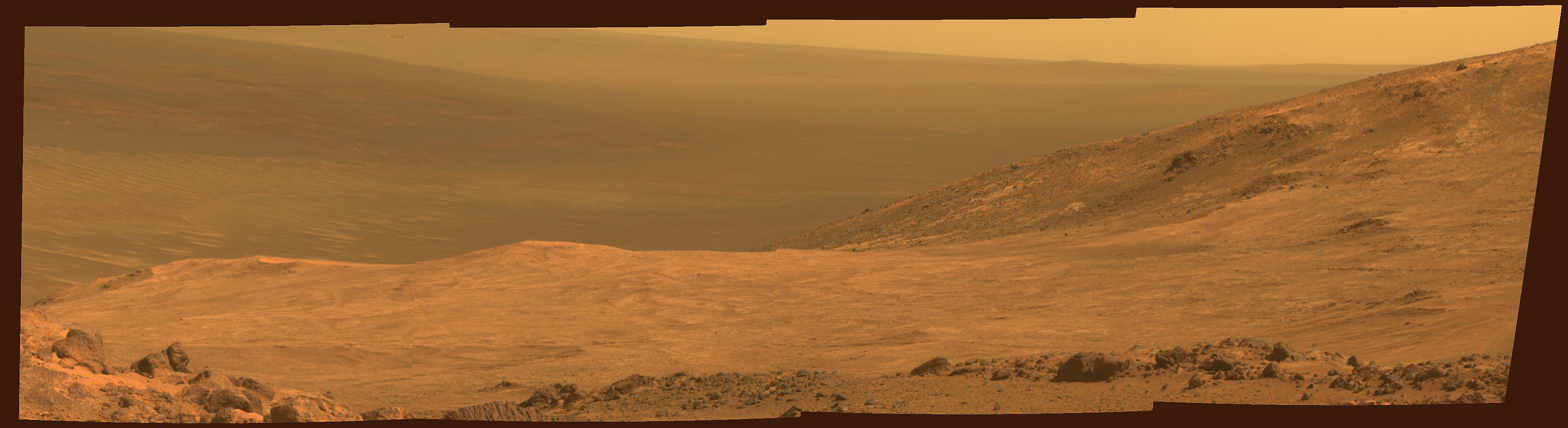
Marathon Valley as viewed by the Opportunity rover (false color; stereo; March 13, 2015).
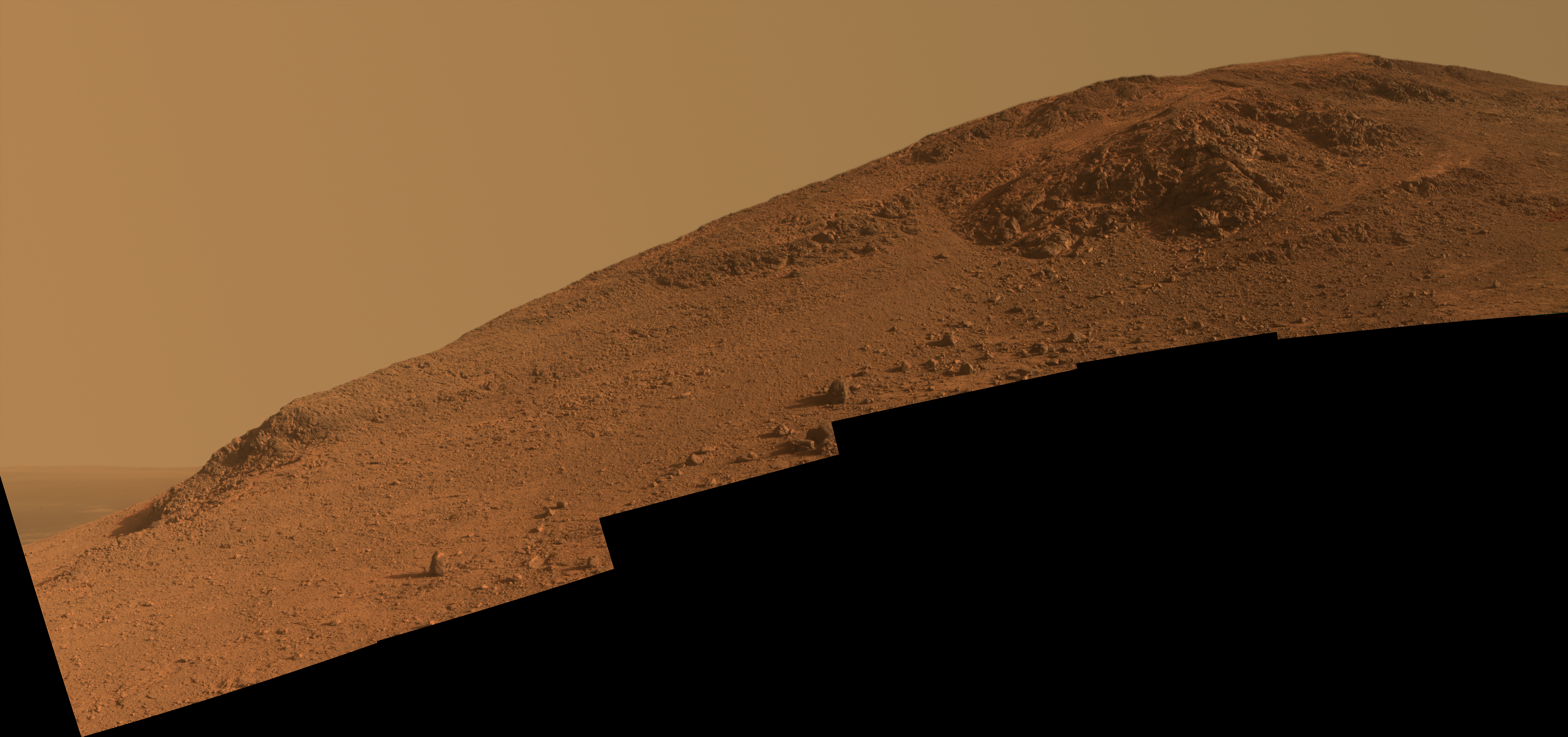
Looking up at Knudsen Ridge, which is on the southern side of Marathon Valley (October 2015)

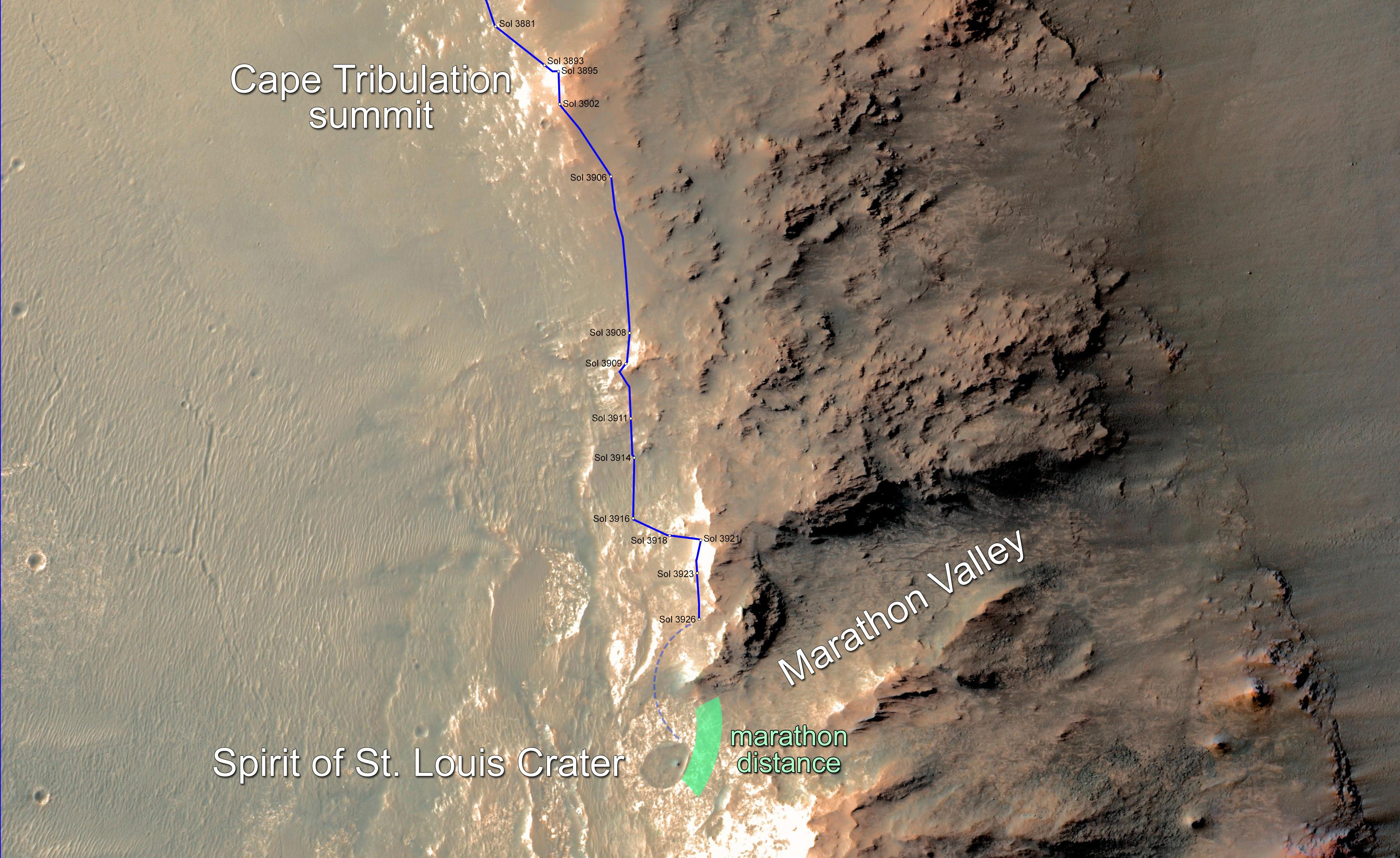
Opportunity's traverse up to February 2015 as it approached Spirit of Saint Louis Crater and Marathon Valley, and came close to traveling the distance of a traditional marathon (about 26 miles or 42 km)

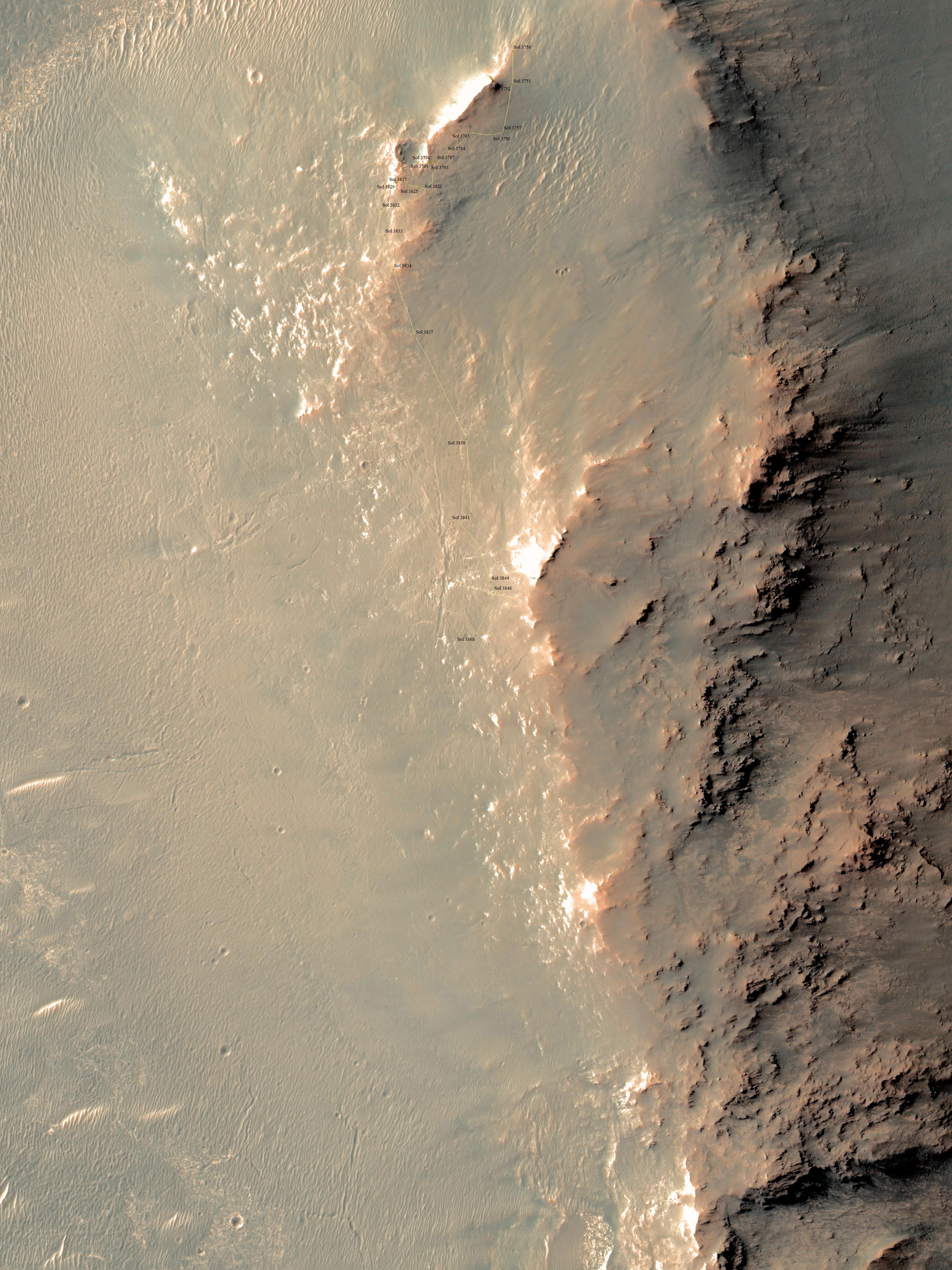
Traverse as of December 2014 from roughly sol 3750 to 3868. To the north Ulysses crater can be seen and to the south, the north wall of Marathon Valley

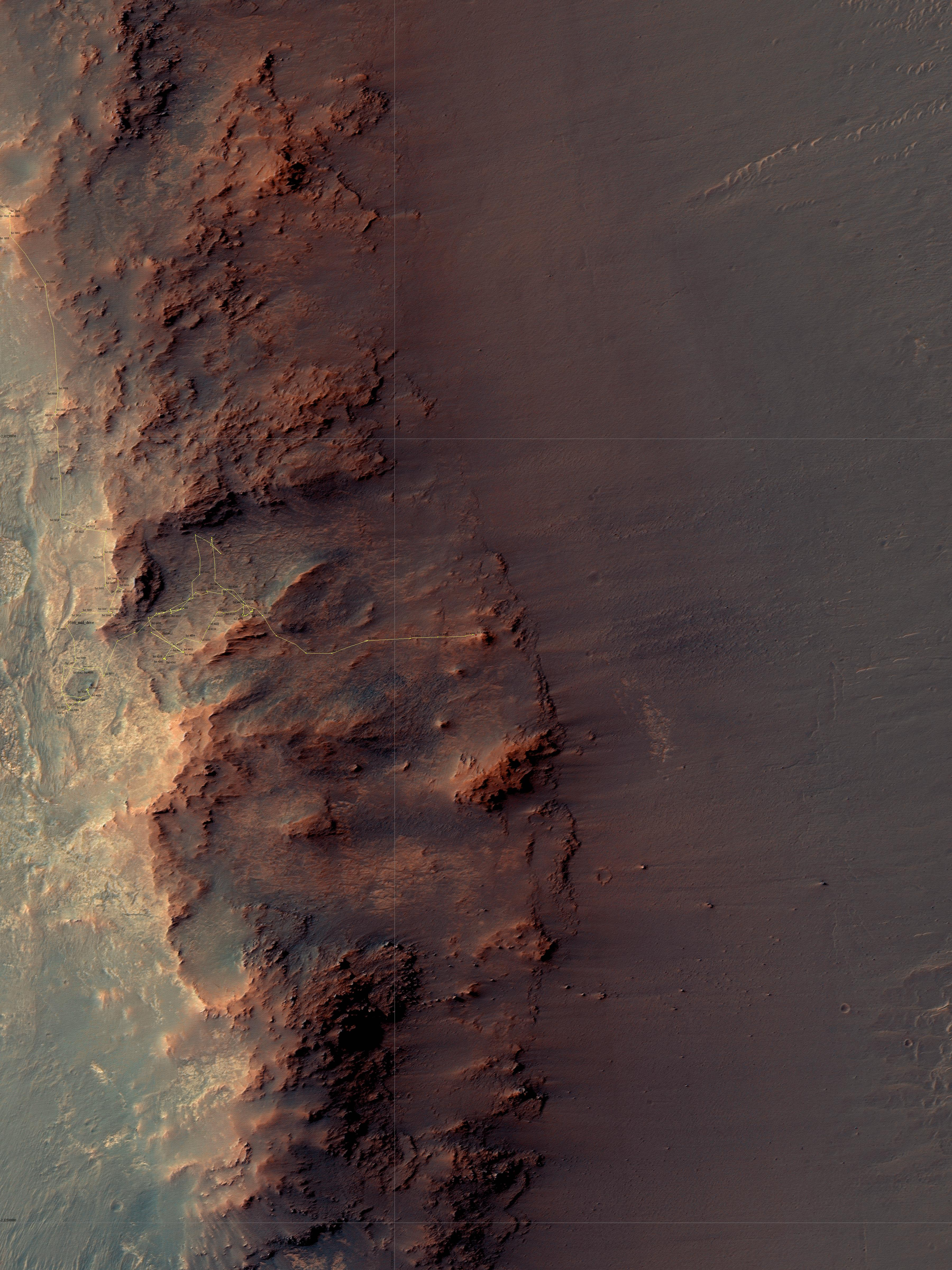
A detailed-class rover traverse map by the mission, released on September 28, 2016, showing the track of the rover up to Sol 4500 as it heads deeper in Endeavor crater

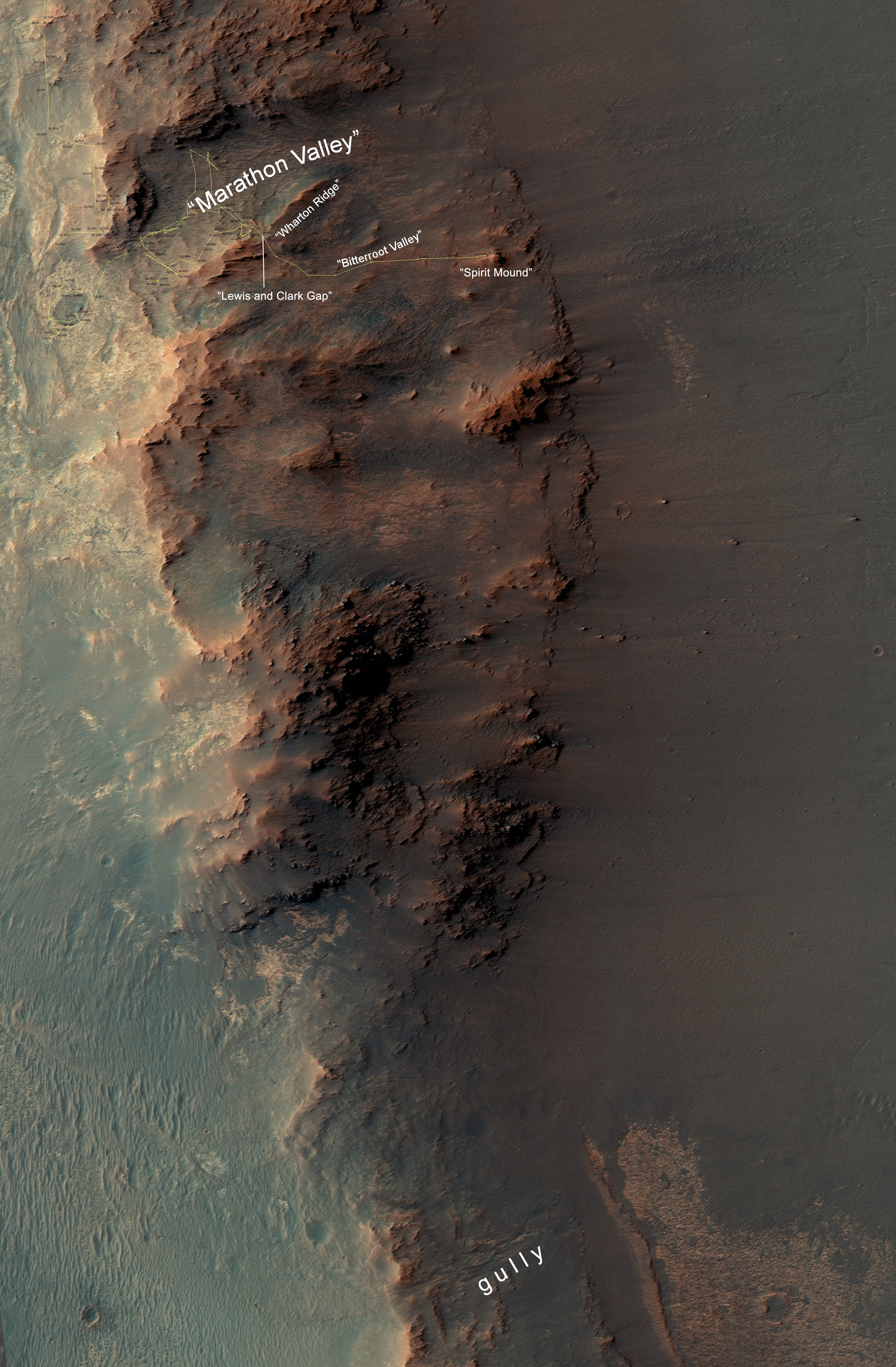
Annotated version of MER-B traverse to Spirit Mound from Marathon Valley in late 2016

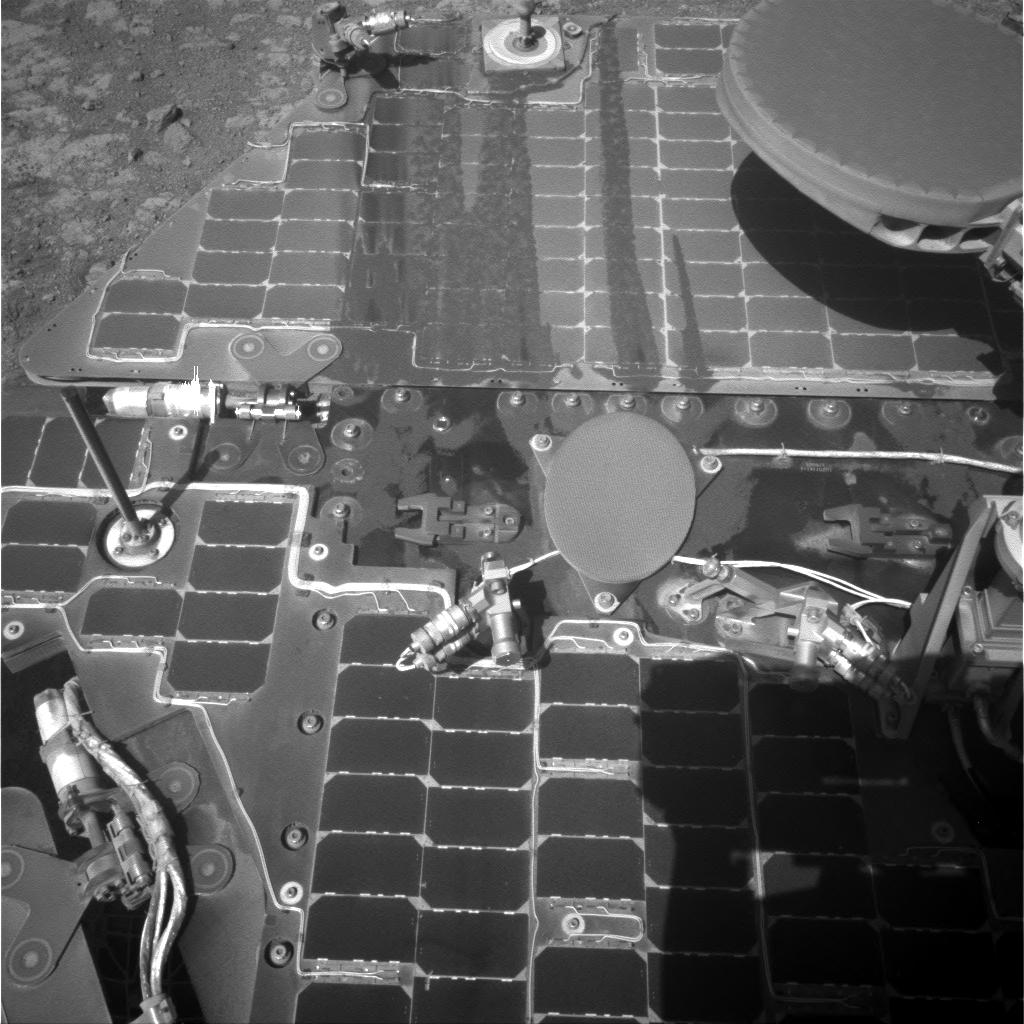
In March 2016, while trying to reach target on the slope of Marathon Valley in Cape Tribulation, the Mars rover attained a slope of 32 degrees, the highest angle yet for the rover since its mission began. This was so steep that dust that had accumulated on its top panels began to flow downward.

== Spirit of St. Louis Crater ==
Along Cape Tribulation, at the west end of Marathon Valley is a shallow crater about 110 feet (34 meters) long and about 80 feet (24 meters) wide, named "Spirit of St. Louis" after the record-breaking aircraft. Within its center is a rock spire and the regolith in the crater has a darkened hue. The crater is on the outer edge of the Western rom of Endeavour crater. The MER-B rover reached it in April 2015 and took panoramic color photos of the site.

Additional NASA team named features:

- Marathon Monument
- Donald A Hall
- Lindbergh Mound
- Roosevelt Field
- Lambert Field
- Harry H Knight
- Harold M Bixby
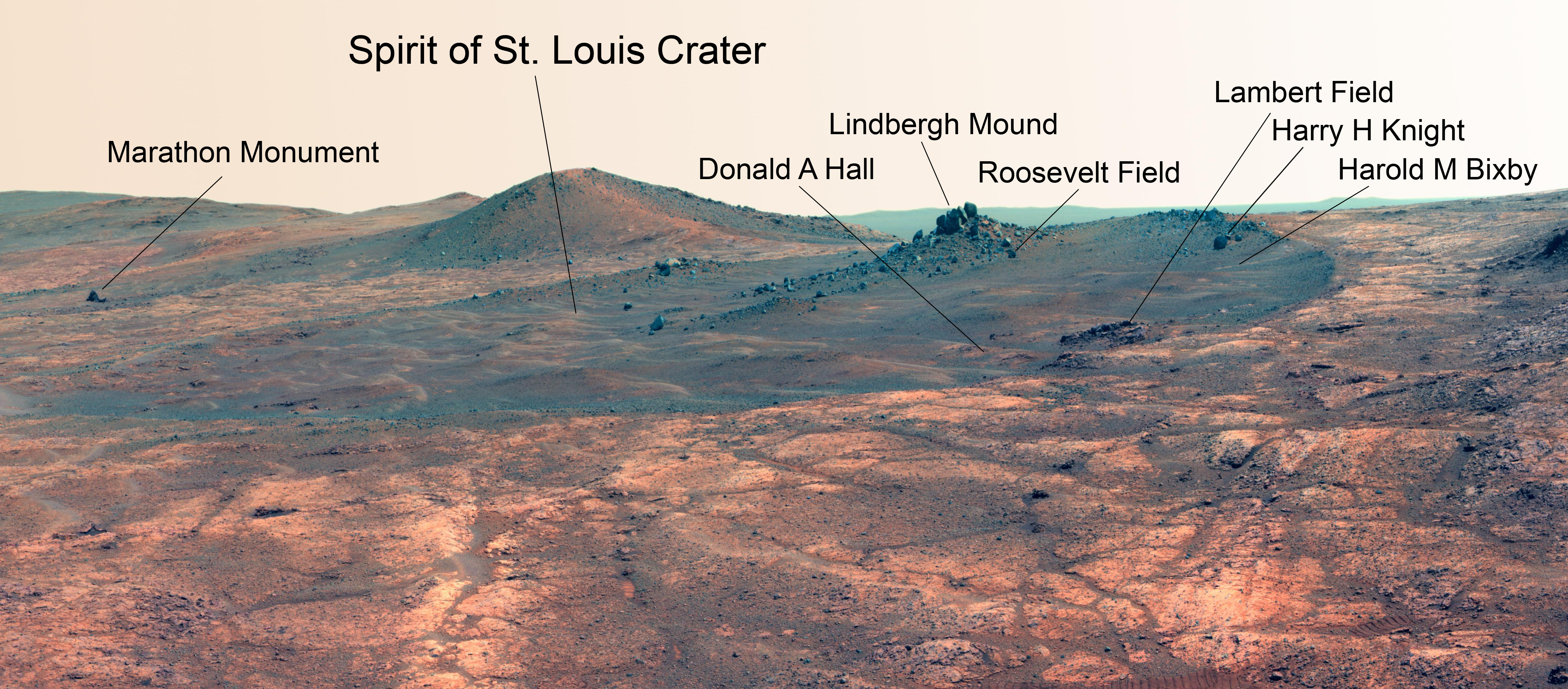
In May 2015 the rover visited Spirit of St. Louis Crater, a shallow crater about 110 feet (34 meters) long and 80 feet (24 meters) across. In its center is Lindbergh Mound, about 2-3 meters (yards) high. This version of the panorma is annotated and in false color

== Context map ==
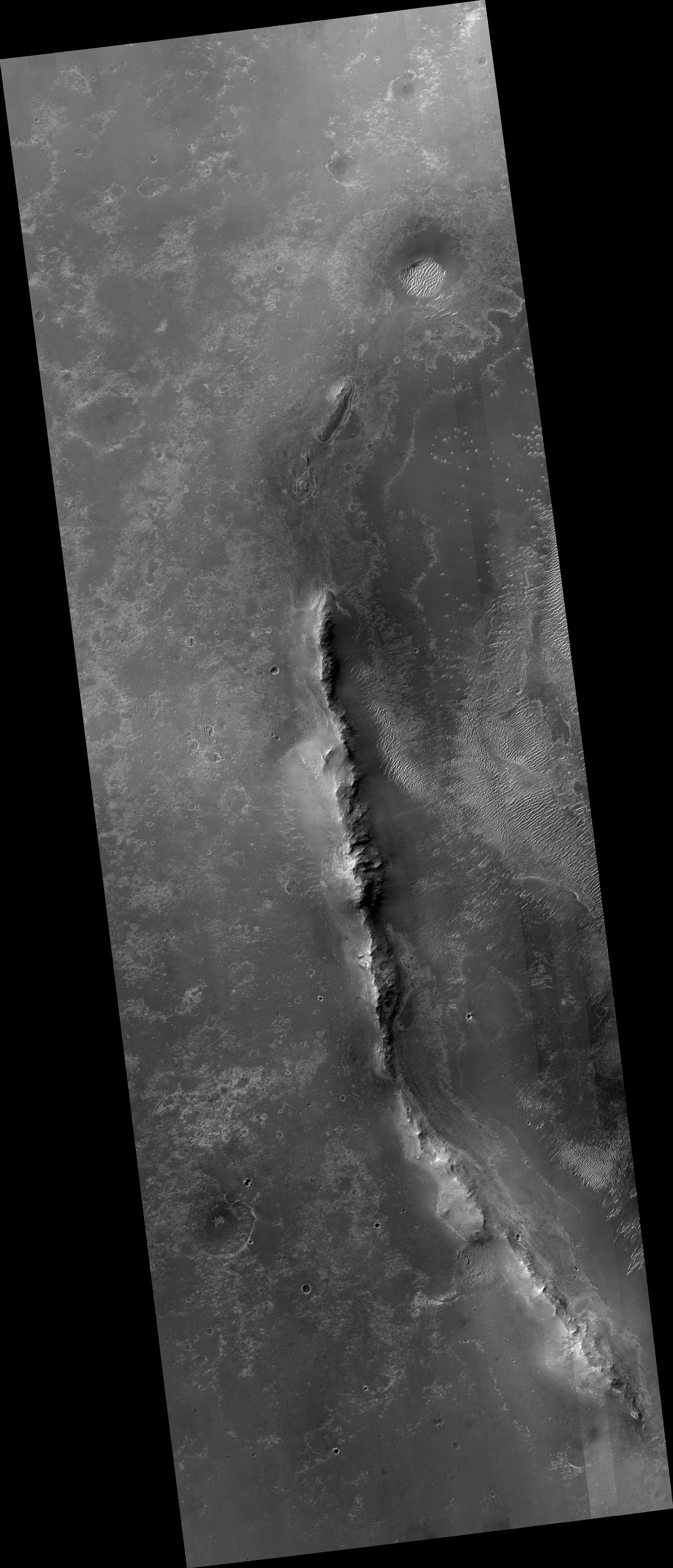
Context image of the Western rim including Cape Tribulation

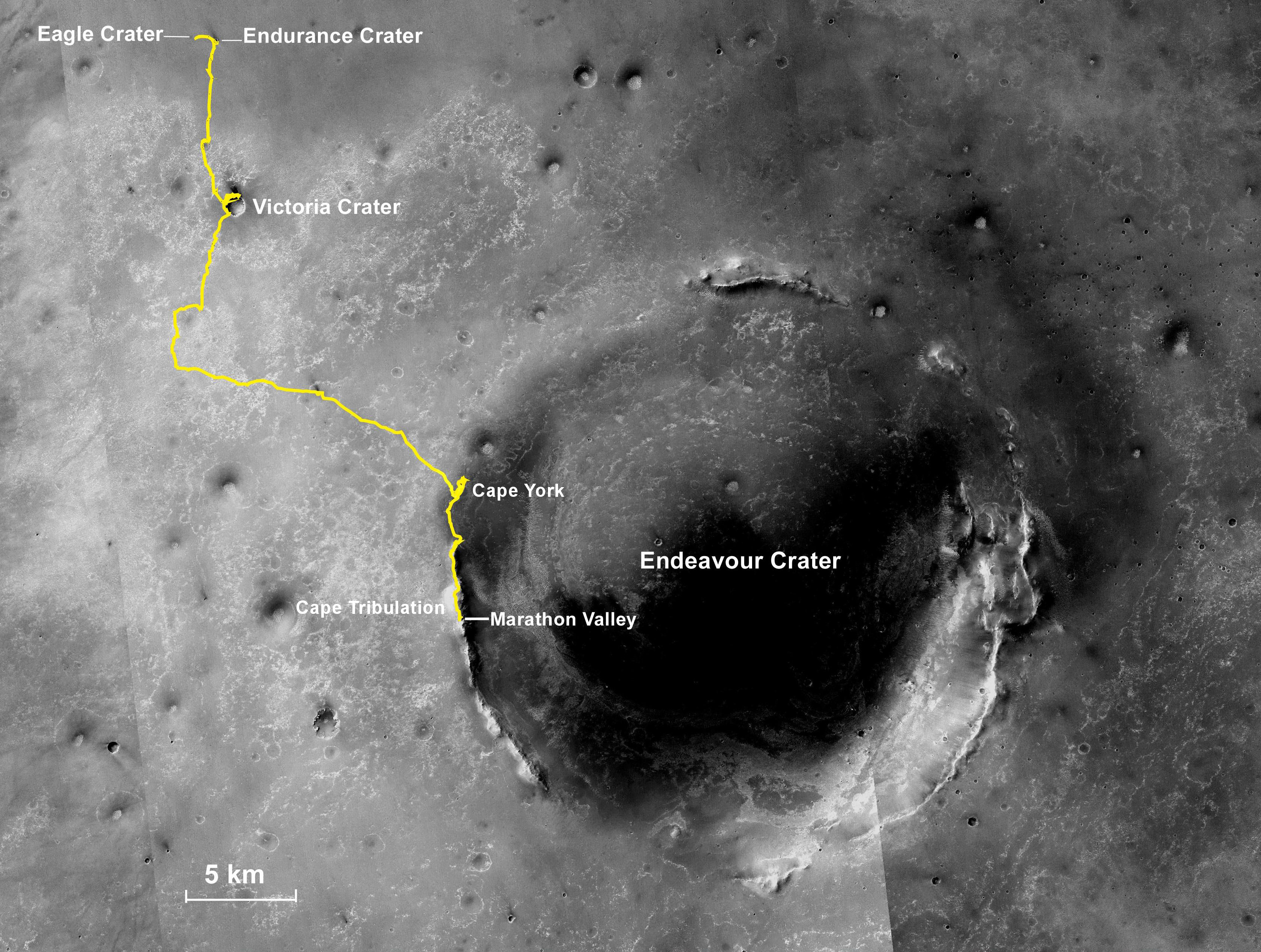
Opportunity's traverse up to March 2015 from its landing site to Endeavour crater. It has traversed south along the Western rim and orbiting spacecraft have help collect data on the rim, which in turn allows the rover to more closely investigate. The rover reached part way through Cape Tribulation at that time

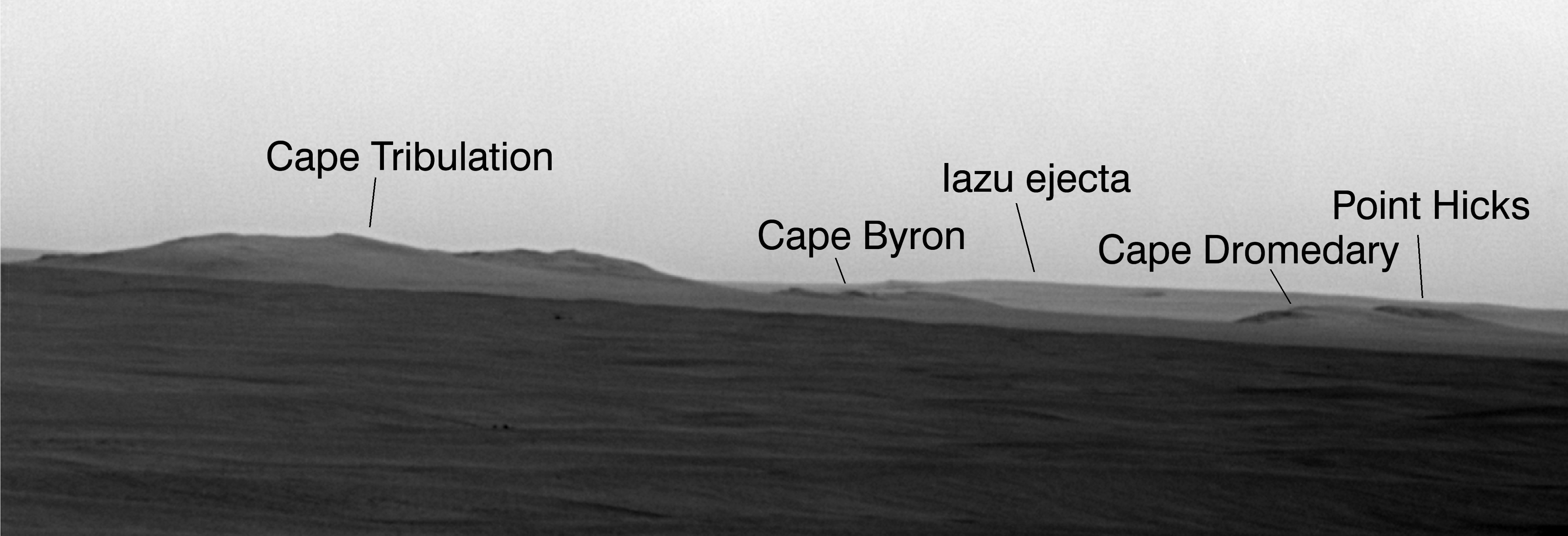
In 2010, while still years away from reaching Endeavour crater, Cape Tribulation was seen from the Western side as MER-B approached

=== Mineral map ===
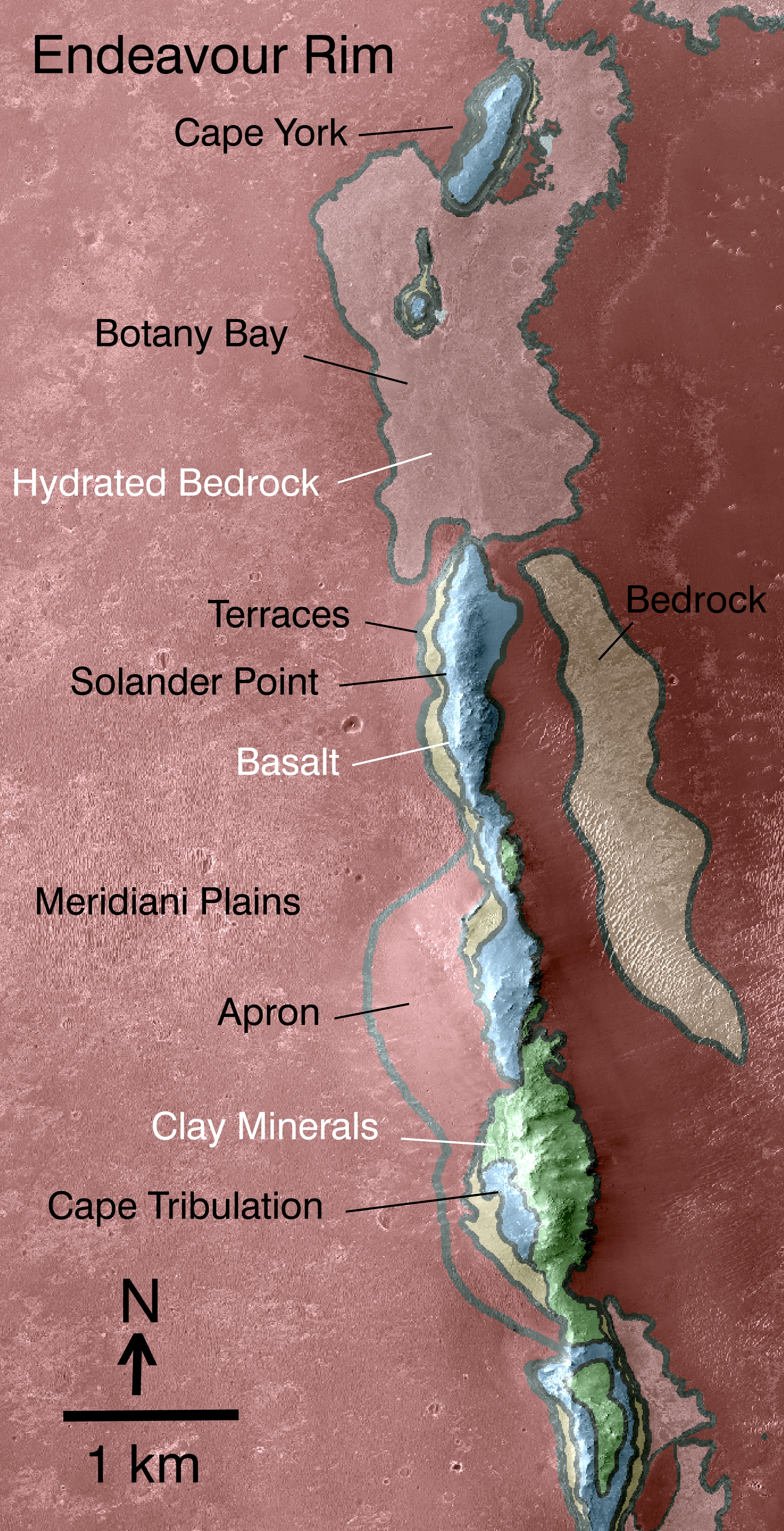
This is a geological map based on MRO's CRISM observations

== See also ==
- Cape York (Mars)
- Cape Tribulation (Earth)
