= Cape York =

Cape York may refer to:

- Cape York (Greenland), a cape at the north-west coast of Greenland, in northern Baffin Bay
  - Cape York meteorite, meteorite found in 1894 near Cape York, Greenland
- Cape York Peninsula, a large peninsula located in Queensland, Australia
  - Cape York (Queensland), the northernmost point of Cape York Peninsula
- Cape York (Mars), a location on the northwest rim of Endeavour crater on the planet Mars
