= Cape York (Mars) =

Location on Mars

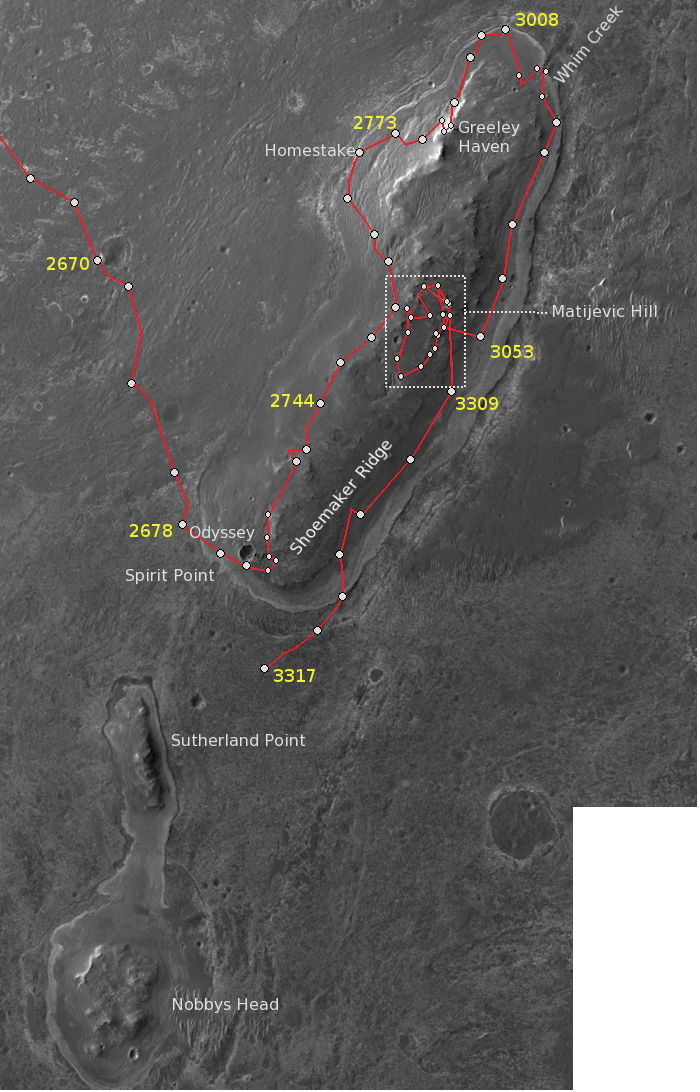
An overview map of Cape York, showing the path of Opportunity Mars rover and various locations it visited there in the 2010s

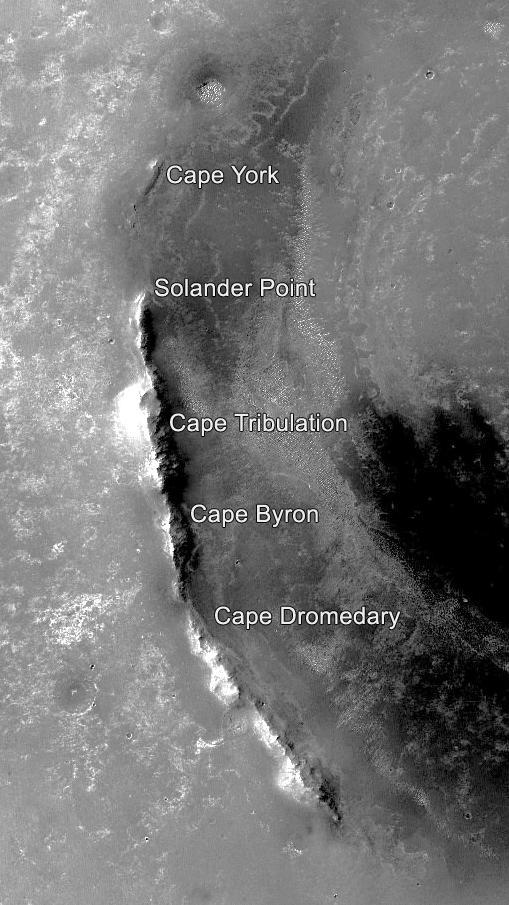
Annotated map with location of Cape Tribulation, on Endeavour crater's western rim

Cape York is a location on Mars, on the western rim of Endeavour crater. The Opportunity rover spent about two years exploring this portion of the rim in the early 2010s before moving south. The CRISM instrument on the Mars Reconnaissance Orbiter identified clay smectites in an area of Cape York, and the rover was sent to explore this location. MER-B Opportunity spend its fifth Martian Winter at Greeley Haven at Cape York, and also took a panorama at that location. MER-B spent 19 weeks stationed at Greeley Haven surviving the winter and went on the move again in May 2012, to further explore Cape York.

MER-B arrived at Cape York in 2011 at Odyssey crater, which is on the southern end of the feature. Opportunity arrived at Endeavour crater on sol 2709 (August 9, 2011), at a landmark called Spirit Point named after its rover twin, after traversing 21 km (13 mi) from Victoria crater, over a three-year period. Spirit point was the name selected for where MER-B arrived at Endeavour's Cape York, a journey which it set out on in 2008 and it arrived there in the summer of 2011.

Locations and science targets at Cape York include: (Alphabetically ordered:)

- Chester Lake
- Esperance
- Grasberg
- Greeley Haven
- Homestake rock
- Matijevic Hill
- Monte Cristo
- Odyssey crater
- Spirit Point
- Tisdale 2
- Whitewater Lake outcrops
- Whim Creek

South of Cape York is an area called Botany Bay. Features south of Cape York include Sutherland Point, Nobby's Head, and even father south Solander Point

== Location ==
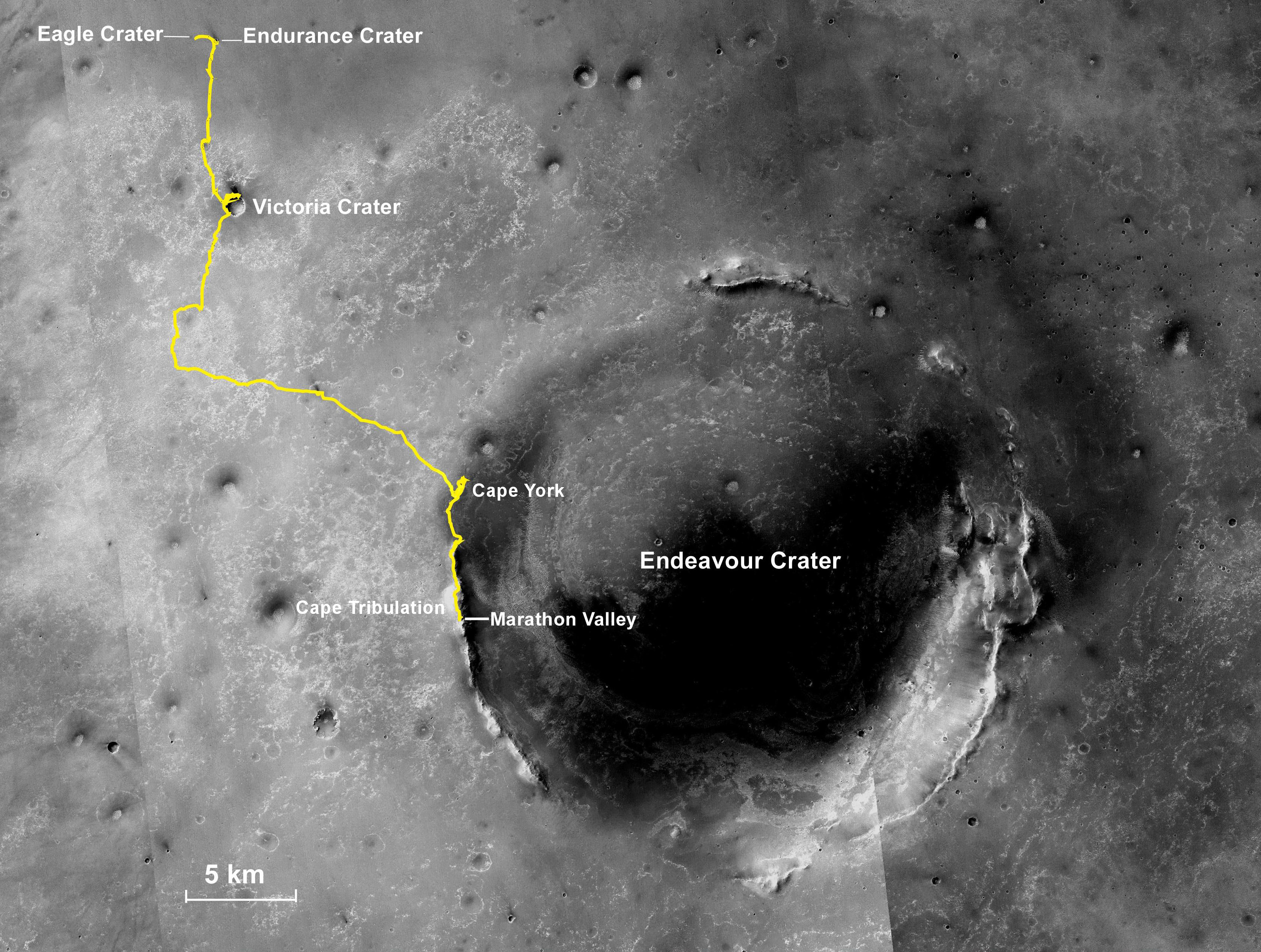
MER-B traverse map with location of Cape York annotated

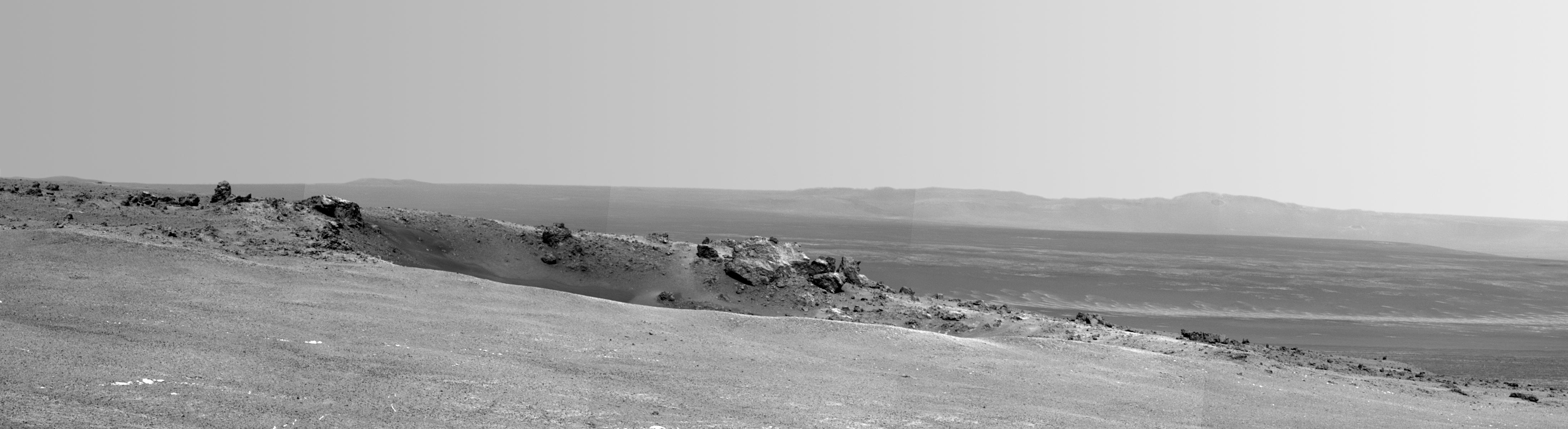
Arrival at Spirit Point at Endeavour crater's Cape York

== MER-B traverse around Cape York ==
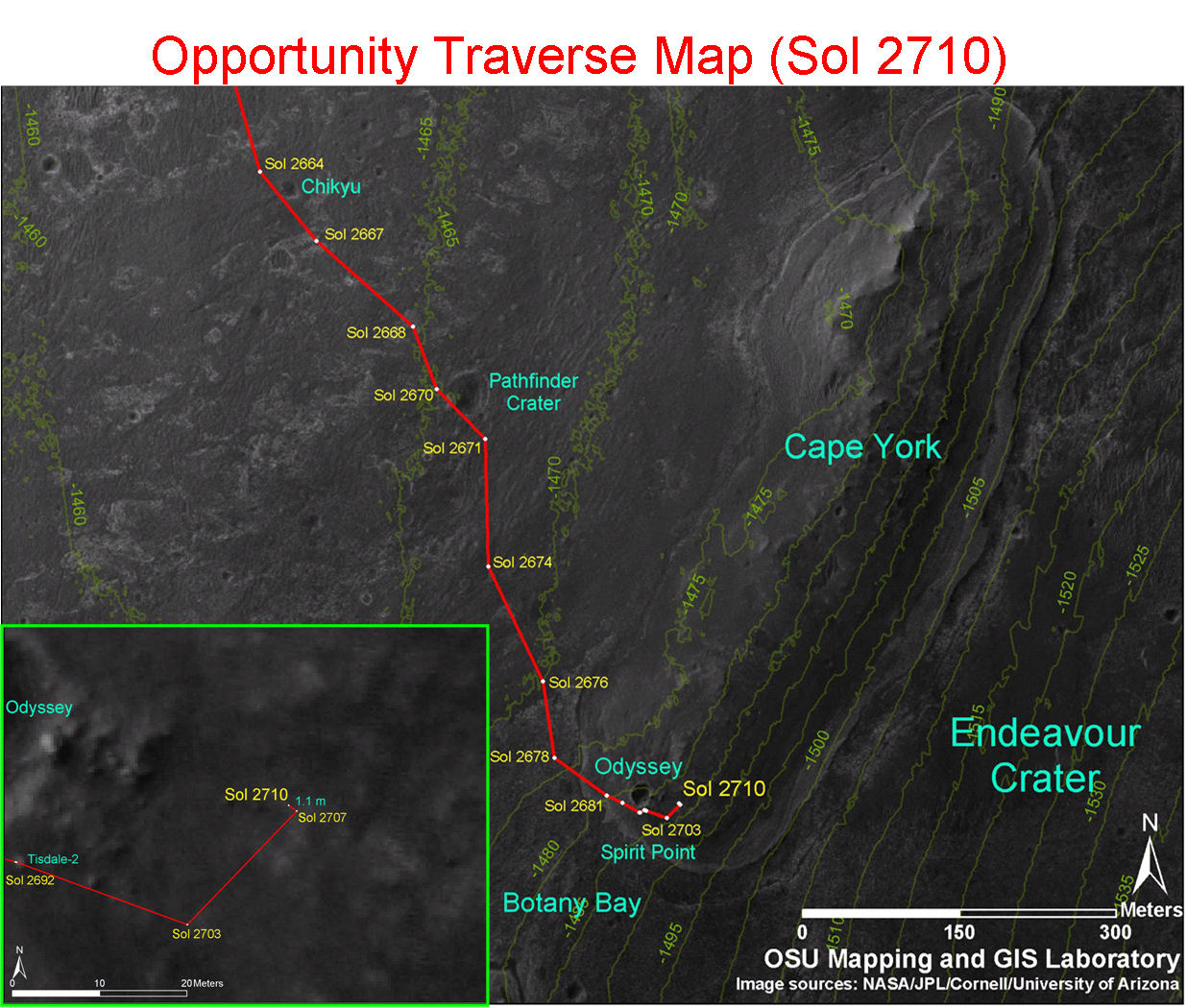
Opportunity arrives at Endeavour crater

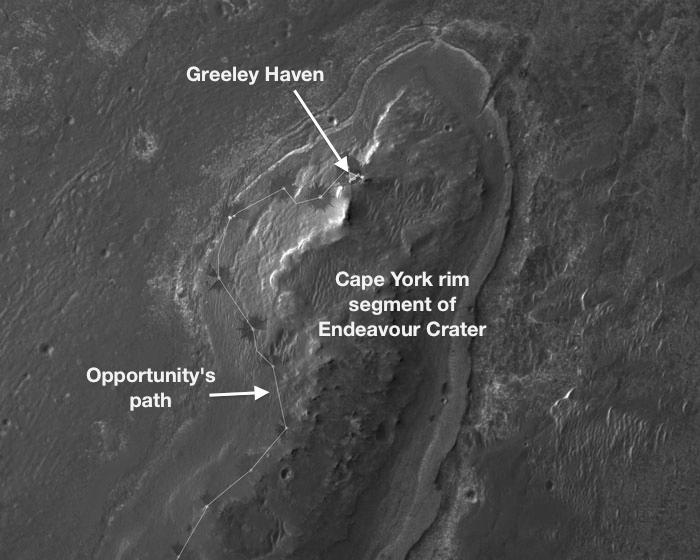
MER-B's traverse to Greely Haven, where it spent many weeks enduring the Martian Winter

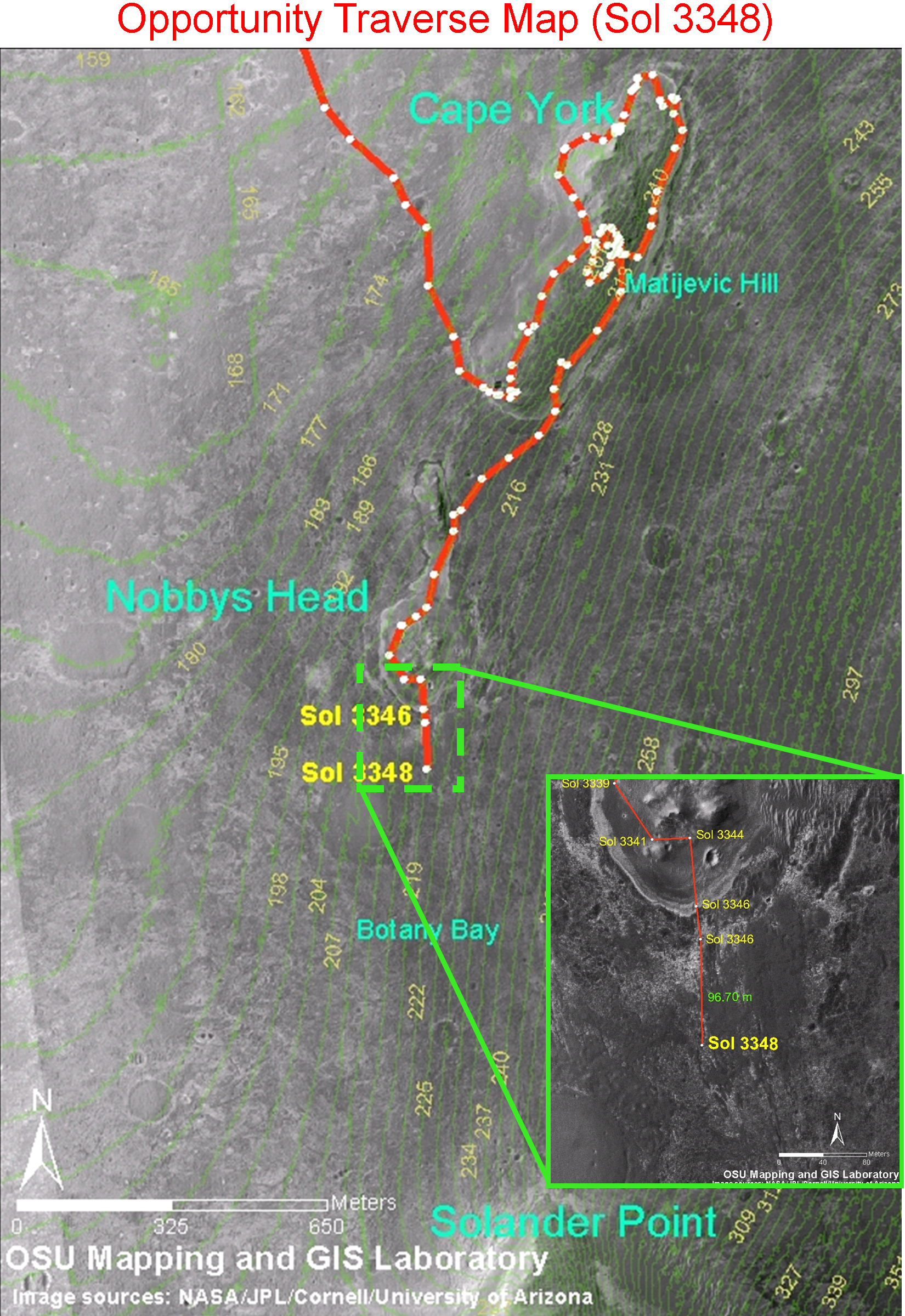
Opportunity's path around Cape York, and then some of its journey after heading south into Botany Bay

== Locations and/or science targets at Cape York ==
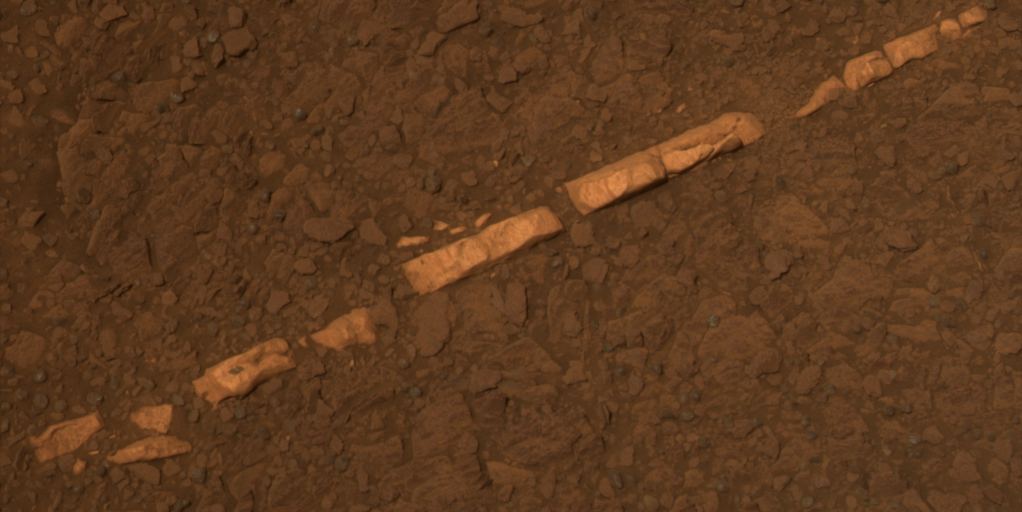
Homestake rock vein (November 2011)

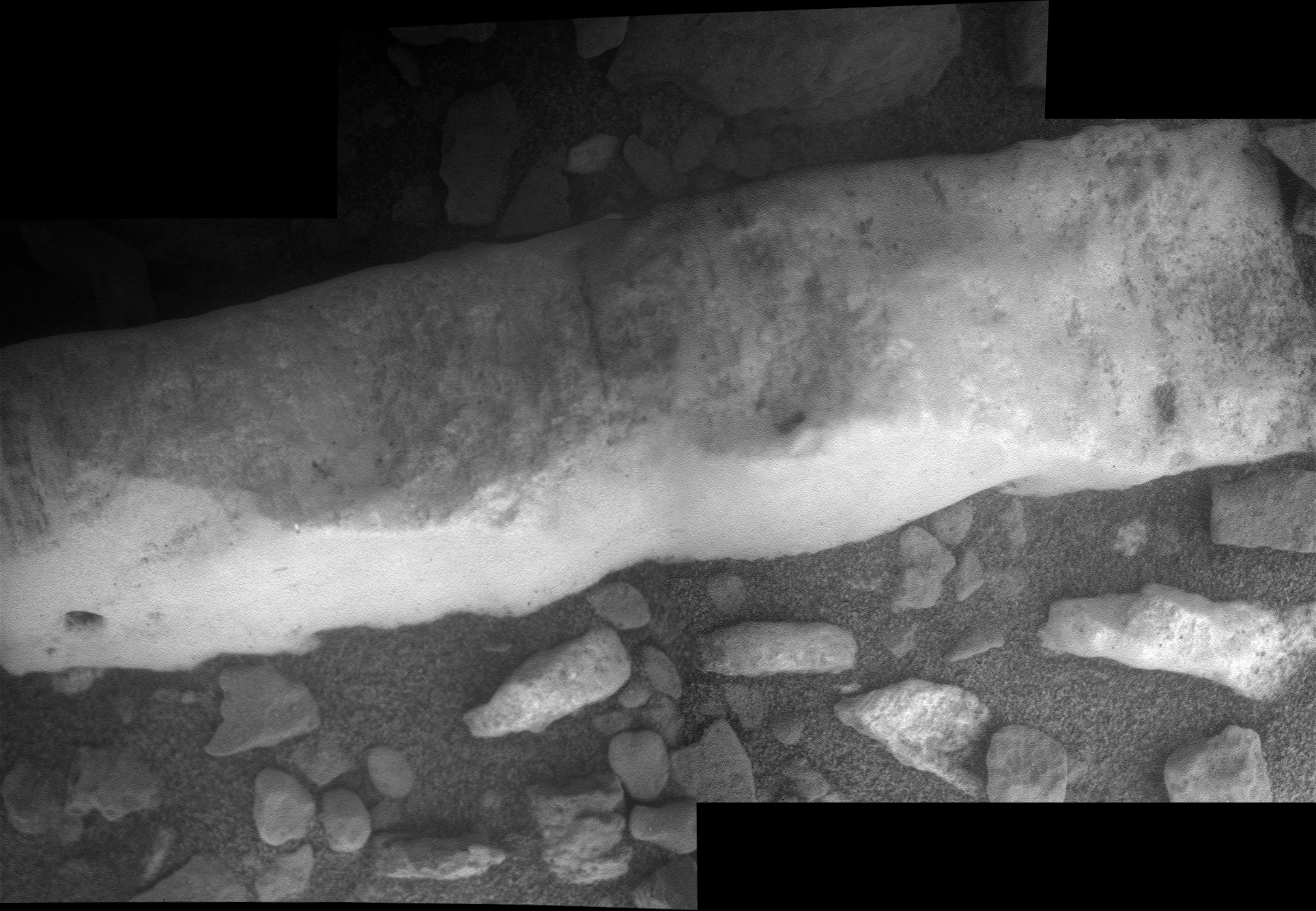
Microscopic Imager view of Homestake formation

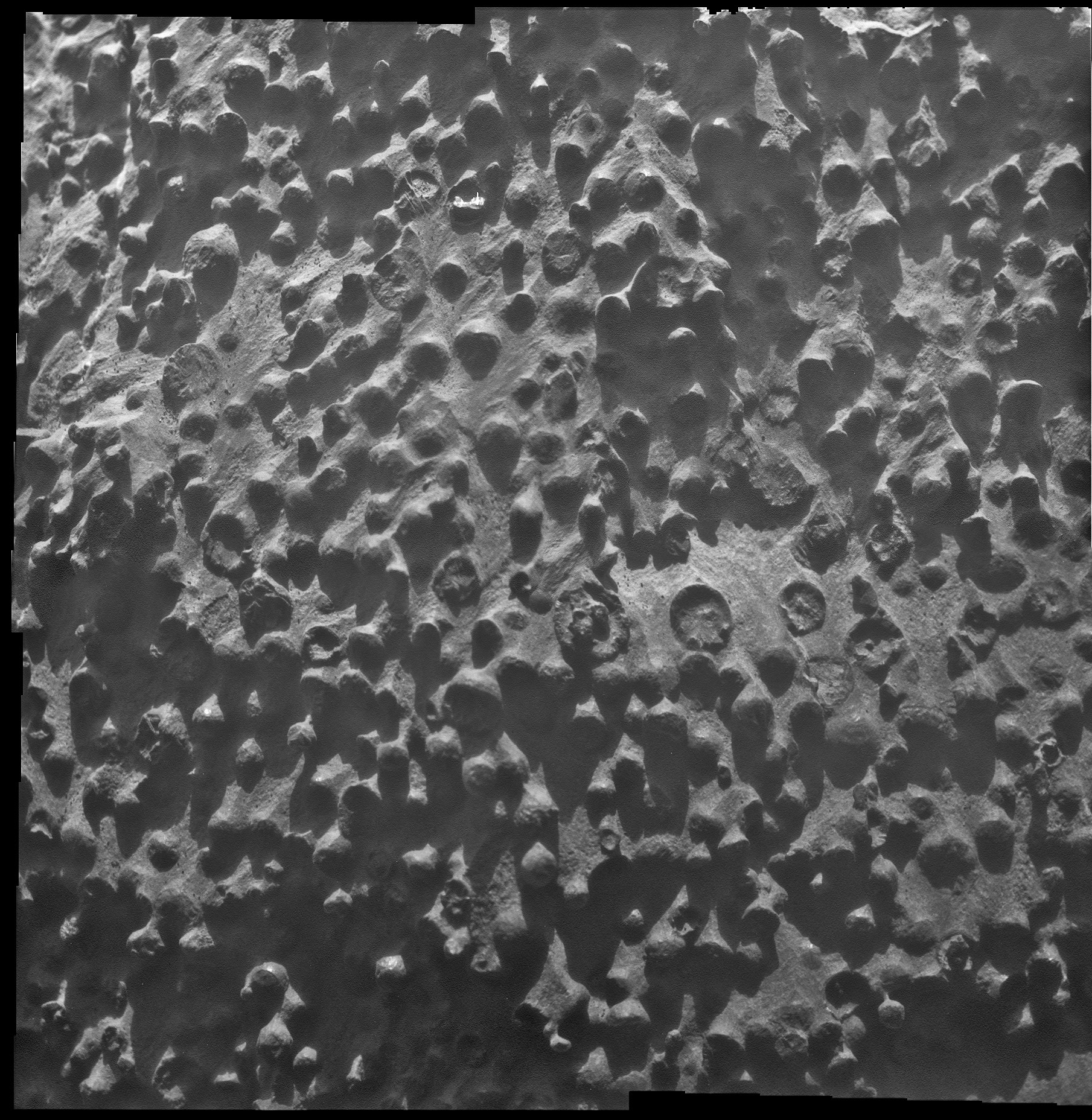
Newberries at Kirkwood (September 2012)

=== Matijevic Hill ===
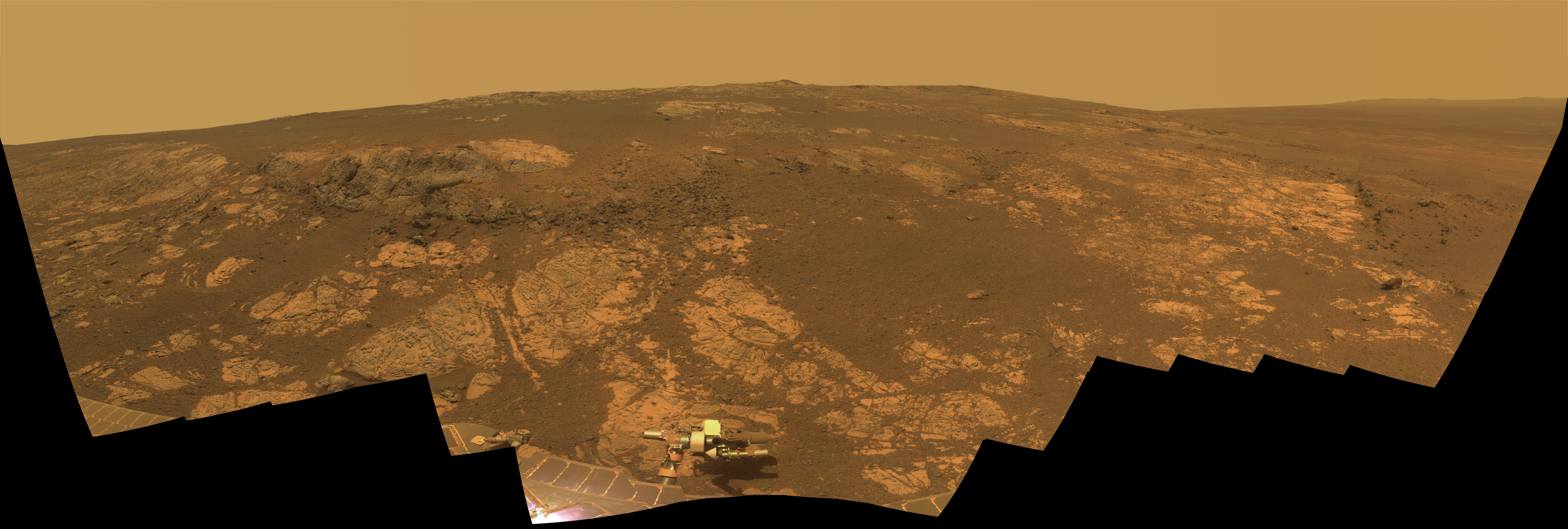
Matijevic Hill Panorama

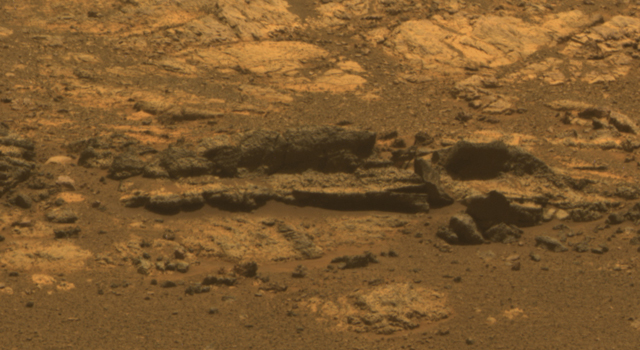
Rock fins at Matijevic Hill, as recorded in August 2012

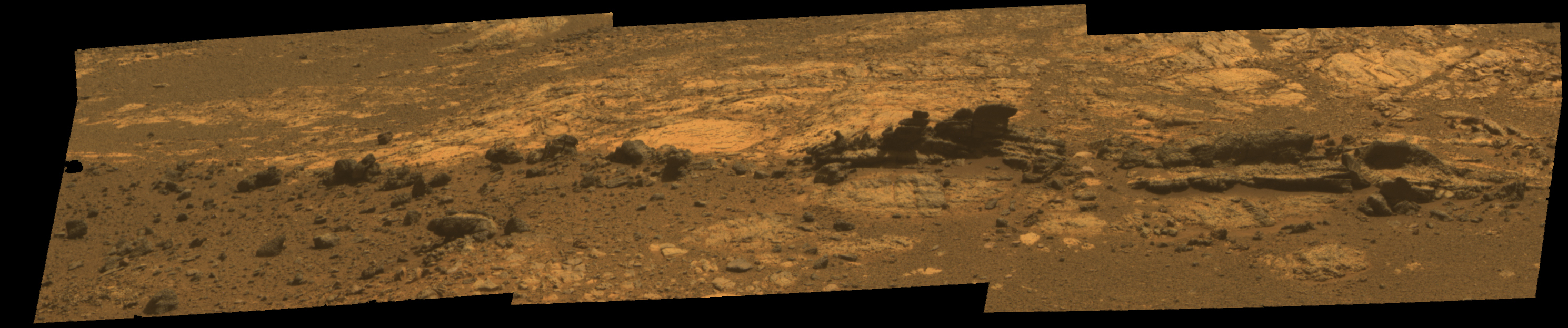
Matijevic Hill rock fin outcrop

== Views ==
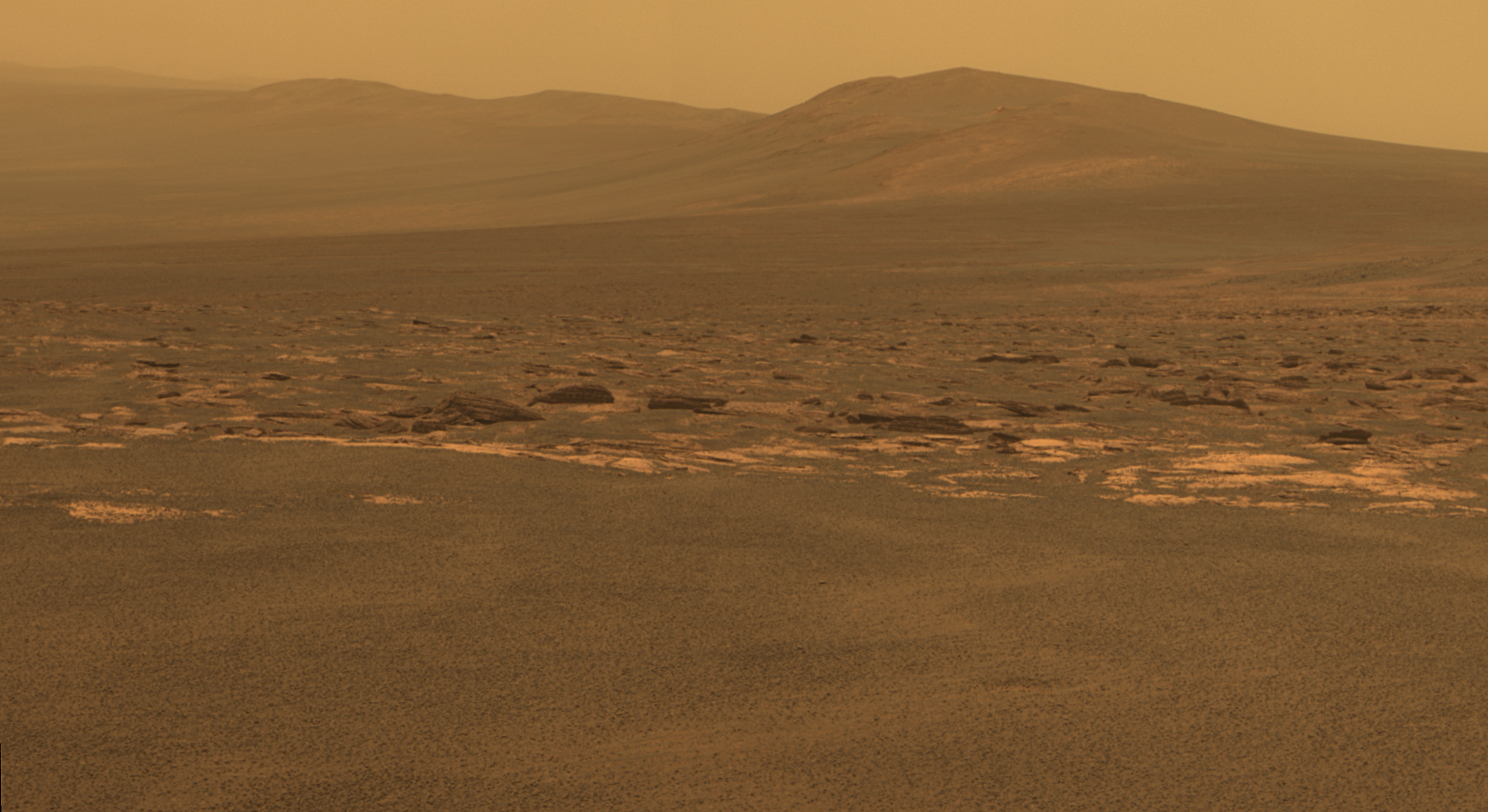
Looking south, Solander point and the western rim can be seen (August 2011)

Greeley Haven Panorama (false color)

== See also ==
- Solander Point
