= Curiosity (rover) =

NASA rover exploring Mars since 2012

- Part of Mars Science Laboratory
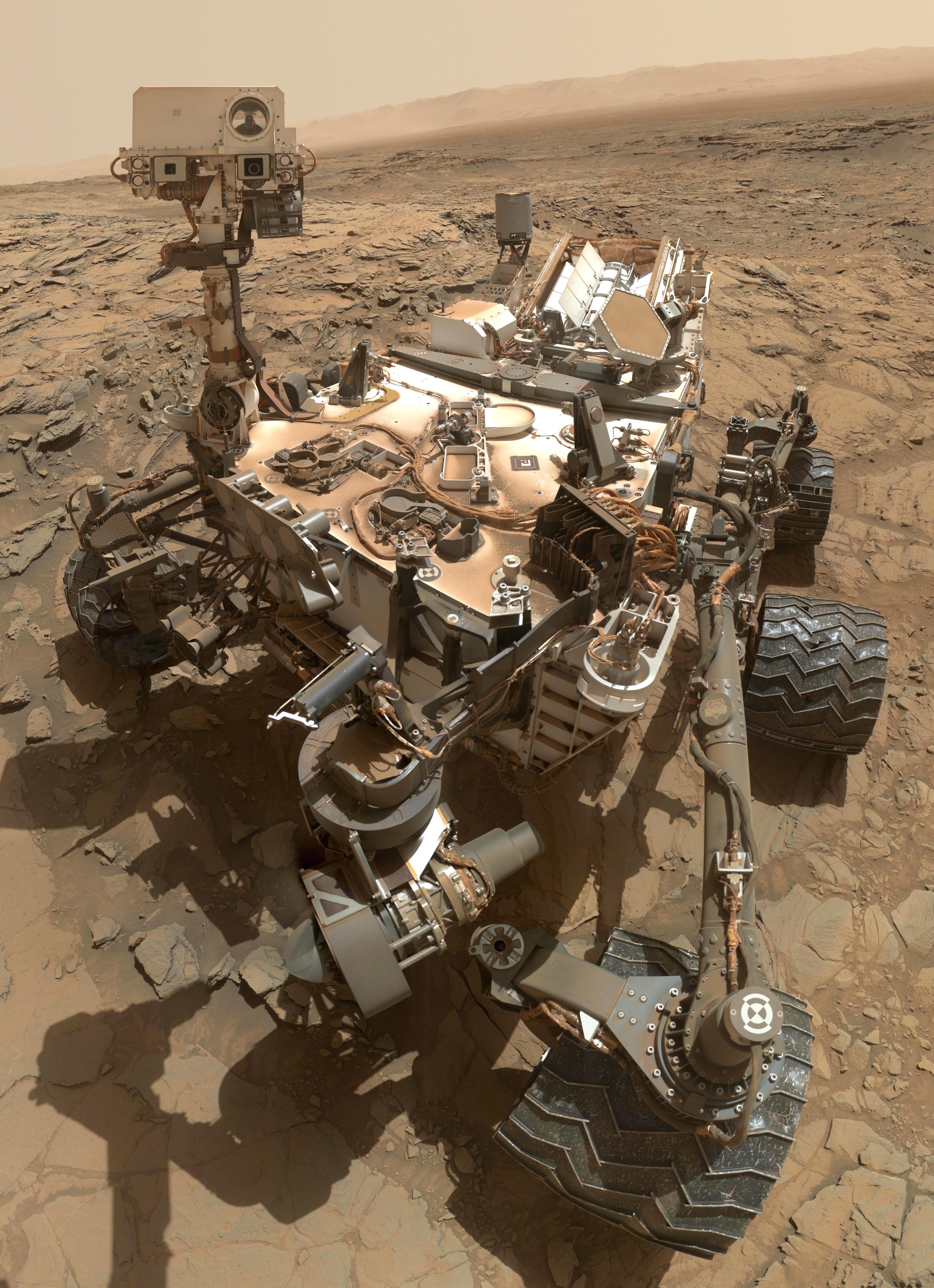
- Self-portrait by Curiosity in 2015
- Type: Mars rover
- Owner: NASA
- Manufacturer: Jet Propulsion Laboratory

Specifications
- Dimensions: 2.9 m × 2.7 m × 2.2 m (9 ft 6 in × 8 ft 10 in × 7 ft 3 in)
- Dry mass: 899 kilograms (1,982 lb)
- Communication: UHF: ~400 MHz, 2 Mbit/s; X band: 7–8 GHz, 800 bit/s
- Power: MMRTG: ~100 W (0.13 hp)
- Rocket: Atlas V 541

Instruments
- APXS; ChemCam; CheMin; DAN; Hazcam × 8; MAHLI; MARDI; MastCam; Navcam × 4; RAD; REMS; SAM

History
- Launched: November 26, 2011, 15:02 UTC; from Cape Canaveral SLC-41
- Deployed: August 6, 2012, 05:17 UTC; 14 years ago; from the MSL EDLS
- Location: Gale crater, Mars
- Traveled: 38.16 km (23.71 mi) on Mars as of 30 October 2026

NASA Mars rovers

Curiosity is a Mars rover that is exploring Gale crater and Mount Sharp on Mars as part of NASA's Mars Science Laboratory (MSL) mission. Launched in 2011 and landed the following year, the car-sized rover continues to operate more than a decade after its original two-year mission.

Curiosity was launched from Cape Canaveral, Florida, on November 26, 2011, at 15:02:00 UTC and landed on Aeolis Palus inside Gale crater on Mars on August 6, 2012, 05:17:57 UTC. The Bradbury Landing site was less than 2.4 km (1.5 mi) from the center of the rover's touchdown target after a 560 million km (350 million mi) journey.

Mission goals include an investigation of the Martian climate and geology, an assessment of whether the selected field site inside Gale has ever offered environmental conditions favorable for microbial life (including investigation of the role of water), and planetary habitability studies in preparation for human exploration.

In December 2012, Curiosity's two-year mission was extended indefinitely. On August 6, 2022, a detailed overview of accomplishments by the Curiosity rover for the last ten years was reported. The rover is still operational, and as of November 15, 2026, Curiosity has been active on Mars for 5075 sols (5214 total days; 14 years, 101 days) since its landing (see current status).

The NASA/JPL Mars Science Laboratory/Curiosity Project Team was awarded the 2012 Robert J. Collier Trophy by the National Aeronautic Association "In recognition of the extraordinary achievements of successfully landing Curiosity on Mars, advancing the nation's technological and engineering capabilities, and significantly improving humanity's understanding of ancient Martian habitable environments." Curiosity's rover design served as the basis for NASA's 2021 Perseverance mission, which carries different scientific instruments.

== Mission ==
=== Goals and objectives ===
Animation of the Curiosity rover, showing its capabilities

As established by the Mars Exploration Program, the main scientific goals of the MSL mission are to help determine whether Mars could ever have supported life, as well as determining the role of water, and to study the climate and geology of Mars. The mission results will also help prepare for human exploration. To contribute to these goals, MSL has eight main scientific objectives:

Biological

1. Determine the nature and inventory of organic carbon compounds
2. Investigate the chemical building blocks of life (carbon, hydrogen, nitrogen, oxygen, phosphorus, and sulfur)
3. Identify features that may represent the effects of biological processes (biosignatures and biomolecules)

Geological and geochemical

4. Investigate the chemical, isotopic, and mineralogical composition of the Martian surface and near-surface geological materials
5. Interpret the processes that have formed and modified rocks and soils

Planetary process

6. Assess long-timescale (i.e., 4-billion-year) Martian atmospheric evolution processes
7. Determine present state, distribution, and cycling of water and carbon dioxide

Surface radiation

8. Characterize the broad spectrum of surface radiation, including galactic and cosmic radiation, solar proton events and secondary neutrons. As part of its exploration, it also measured the radiation exposure in the interior of the spacecraft as it traveled to Mars, and it is continuing radiation measurements as it explores the surface of Mars. This data would be important for a future crewed mission.

About one year into the surface mission, and having assessed that ancient Mars could have been hospitable to microbial life, the MSL mission objectives evolved to developing predictive models for the preservation process of organic compounds and biomolecules; a branch of paleontology called taphonomy. The region it is set to explore has been compared to the Four Corners region of the North American west.

=== Name ===
A NASA panel selected the name Curiosity following a nationwide student contest that attracted more than 9,000 proposals via the Internet and mail. Twelve-year-old Clara Ma from Sunflower Elementary School in Lenexa, Kansas submitted the winning entry. As her prize, Ma won a trip to NASA's Jet Propulsion Laboratory (JPL) in Pasadena, California, where she signed her name directly onto the rover as it was being assembled.

Ma wrote in her winning essay:

Curiosity is an everlasting flame that burns in everyone's mind. It makes me get out of bed in the morning and wonder what surprises life will throw at me that day. Curiosity is such a powerful force. Without it, we wouldn't be who we are today. Curiosity is the passion that drives us through our everyday lives. We have become explorers and scientists with our need to ask questions and to wonder.

=== Cost ===
Adjusted for inflation, Curiosity has a life-cycle cost of US$3.2 billion in 2020. By comparison, the 2021 Perseverance rover has a life-cycle cost of US$2.9 billion.

== Rover and lander specifications ==
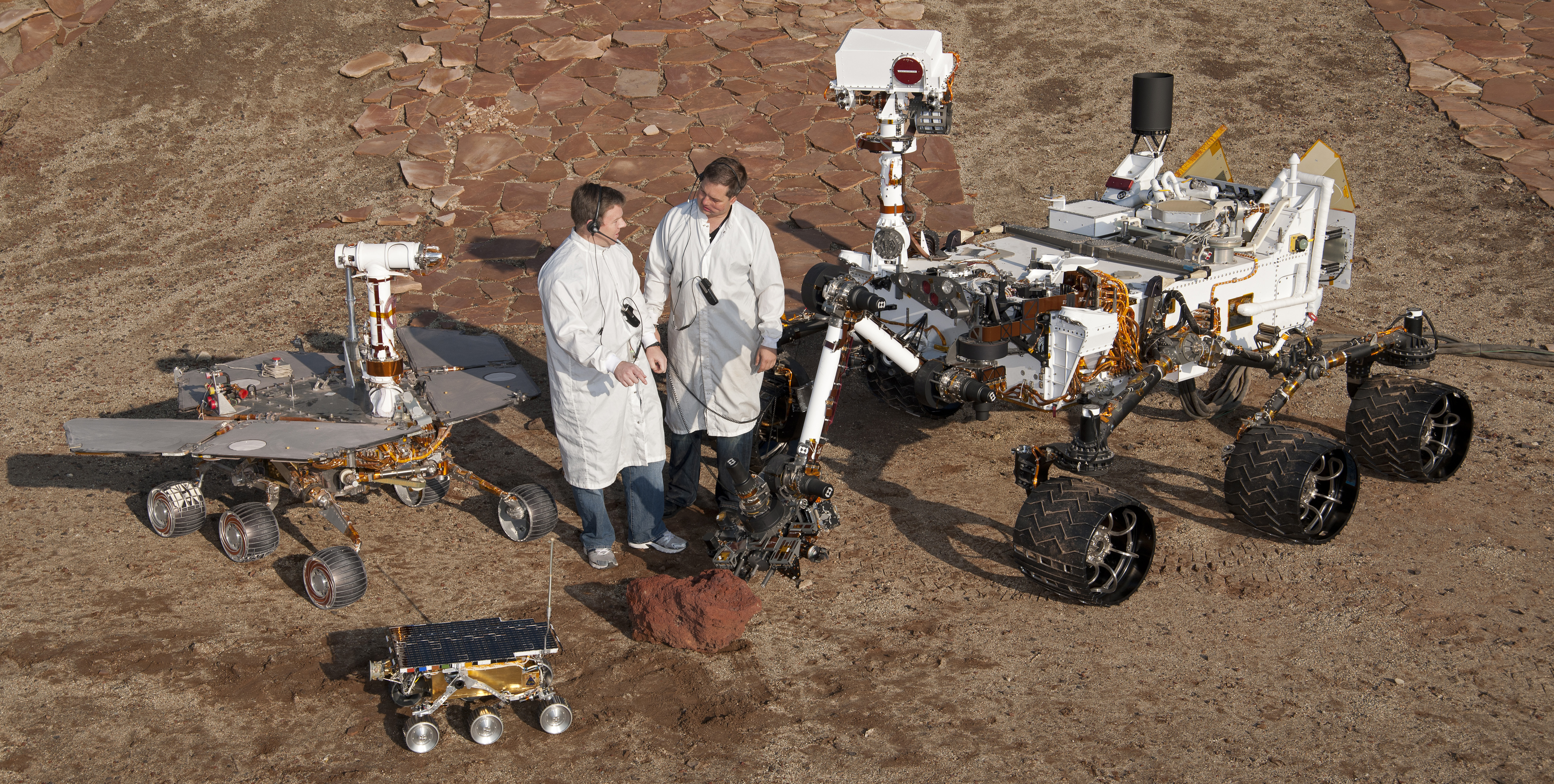
Two Jet Propulsion Laboratory engineers stand with three vehicles, providing a size comparison of three generations of Mars rovers. Front and center left is the flight spare for the first Mars rover, Sojourner, which landed on Mars in 1997 as part of the Mars Pathfinder Project. On the left is a Mars Exploration Rover (MER) test vehicle that is a working sibling to Spirit and Opportunity, which landed on Mars in 2004. On the right is a test rover for the Mars Science Laboratory, which landed as Curiosity on Mars in 2012. Sojourner is 65 cm (26 in) long. The Mars Exploration Rovers (MER) are 1.6 m (5 ft 3 in) long. Curiosity on the right is 3 m (9.8 ft) long.

Curiosity is 2.9 m (9 ft 6 in) long by 2.7 m (8 ft 10 in) wide by 2.2 m (7 ft 3 in) high, larger than Mars Exploration Rovers, which are 1.5 m (4 ft 11 in) long and have a mass of 174 kg (384 lb) including 6.8 kg (15 lb) of scientific instruments. In comparison to Pancam on the Mars Exploration Rovers, the MastCam-34 has 1.25× higher spatial resolution and the MastCam-100 has 3.67× higher spatial resolution.

Curiosity has an advanced payload of scientific equipment on Mars. It is the fourth NASA robotic rover sent to Mars since 1996. Previous successful Mars rovers are Sojourner from the Mars Pathfinder mission (1997), and Spirit (2004–2010) and Opportunity (2004–2018) rovers from the Mars Exploration Rover mission.

Curiosity comprised 23% of the mass of the 3,893 kg (8,583 lb) spacecraft at launch. The remaining mass was discarded in the process of transport and landing.

- Dimensions: Curiosity has a mass of 899 kg (1,982 lb) including 80 kg (180 lb) of scientific instruments. The rover is 2.9 m (9 ft 6 in) long by 2.7 m (8 ft 10 in) wide by 2.2 m (7 ft 3 in) in height.

The main box-like chassis forms the Warm Electronics Box (WEB).

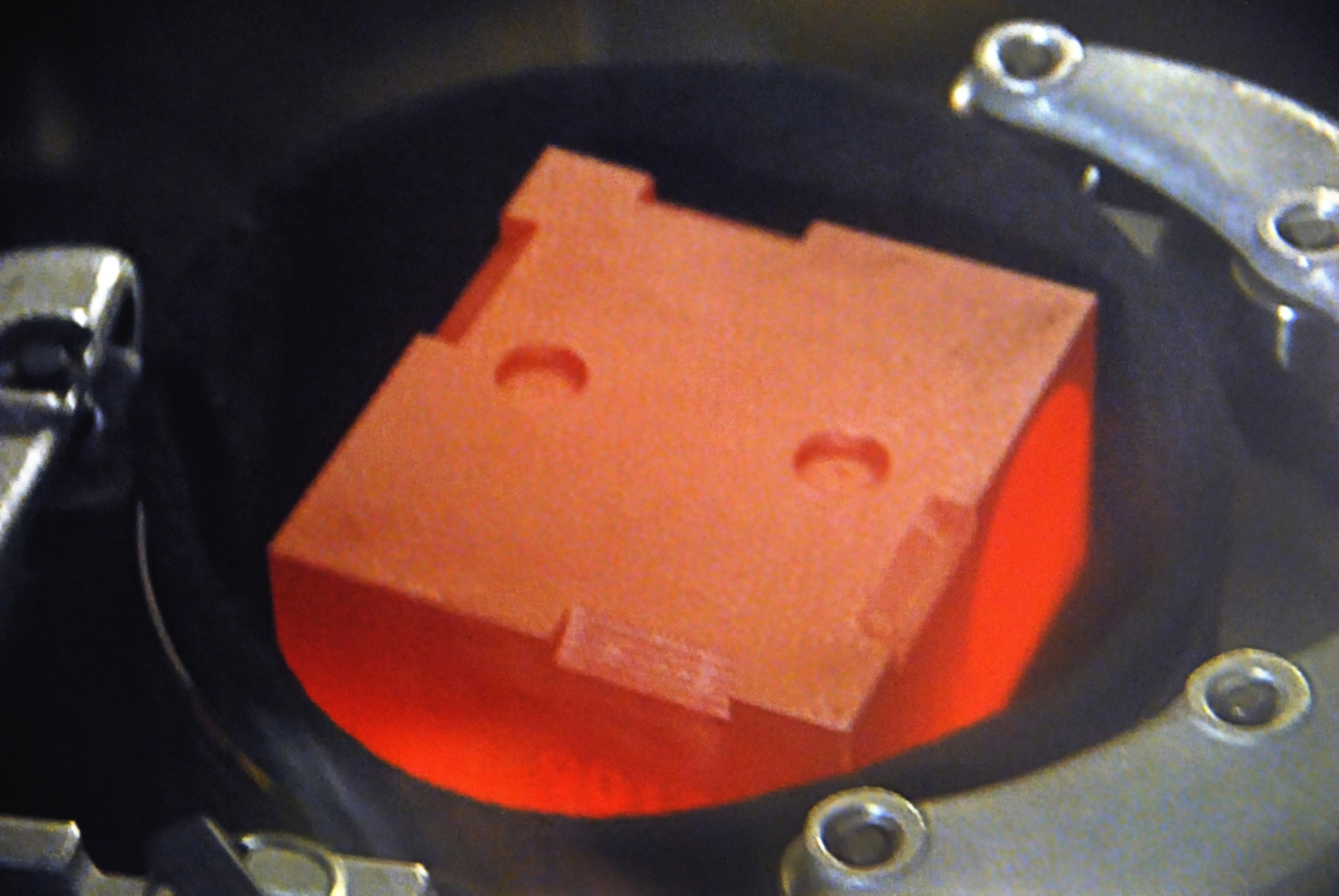
Radioisotope pellet within a graphite shell that fuels the generator

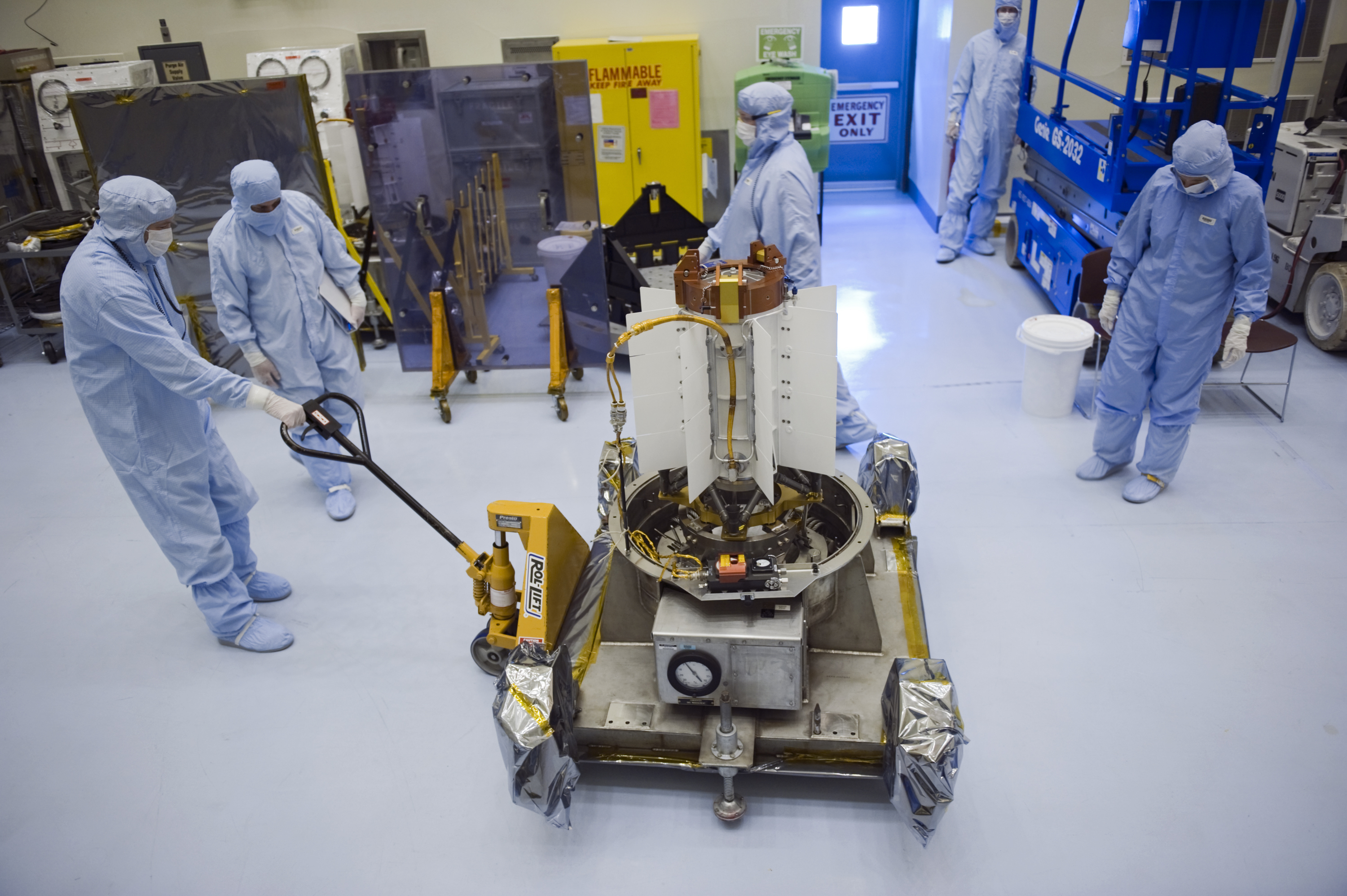
Radioisotope Power System for Curiosity at Kennedy Space Center

- Power source: Curiosity is powered by a radioisotope thermoelectric generator (RTG), like the successful Viking 1 and Viking 2 Mars landers in 1976.

Radioisotope power systems (RPSs) are generators that produce electricity from the decay of radioactive isotopes, such as plutonium-238, which is a non-fissile isotope of plutonium. Heat given off by the decay of this isotope generates electrical power using thermocouples, providing consistent power during all seasons and through the day and night. Waste heat is also used via pipes to warm systems, freeing electrical power for the operation of the vehicle and instruments. Curiosity's RTG is fueled by 4.8 kg (11 lb) of plutonium-238 dioxide supplied by the U.S. Department of Energy.

Curiosity's RTG is the Multi-Mission Radioisotope Thermoelectric Generator (MMRTG), designed and built by Rocketdyne and Teledyne Energy Systems under contract to the U.S. Department of Energy, and fueled and tested by the Idaho National Laboratory. Based on legacy RTG technology, it represents a more flexible and compact development step, and is designed to produce 110 watts of electrical power and about 2,000 watts of thermal power at the start of the mission. The MMRTG produces less power over time as its plutonium fuel decays: at its minimum lifetime of 14 years, electrical power output is down to 100 watts. The power source generates 9 MJ (2.5 kWh) of electrical energy each day, much more than the solar panels of the now retired Mars Exploration Rovers, which generated about 2.1 MJ (0.58 kWh) each day. The electrical output from the MMRTG charges two rechargeable lithium-ion batteries. This enables the power subsystem to meet peak power demands of rover activities when the demand temporarily exceeds the generator's steady output level. Each battery has a capacity of about 42 ampere hours.

- Heat rejection system: The temperatures at the landing site vary seasonally and the thermal system warms the rover as needed. The thermal system does so in several ways: passively, through the dissipation to internal components; by electrical heaters strategically placed on key components; and by using the rover heat rejection system (HRS). It uses fluid pumped through 60 m (200 ft) of tubing in the rover body so that sensitive components are kept at optimal temperatures. The fluid loop serves the additional purpose of rejecting heat when the rover has become too warm, and it can also gather waste heat from the power source by pumping fluid through two heat exchangers that are mounted alongside the RTG. The HRS also has the ability to cool components if necessary.
- Computers: The two identical on-board rover computers, called Rover Compute Element (RCE) contain radiation hardened memory to tolerate the extreme radiation from space and to safeguard against power-off cycles. The computers run the VxWorks real-time operating system (RTOS). Each computer's memory includes 256 kilobytes (kB) of EEPROM, 256 megabytes (MB) of dynamic random-access memory (DRAM), and 2 gigabytes (GB) of flash memory. For comparison, the Mars Exploration Rovers used 3 MB of EEPROM, 128 MB of DRAM, and 256 MB of flash memory.

The RCE computers use the RAD750 Central processing unit (CPU), which is a successor to the RAD6000 CPU of the Mars Exploration Rovers. The IBM RAD750 CPU, a radiation-hardened version of the PowerPC 750, can execute up to 400 Million instructions per second (MIPS), while the RAD6000 CPU is capable of up to only 35 MIPS. Of the two on-board computers, one is configured as backup and will take over in the event of problems with the main computer. On February 28, 2013, NASA was forced to switch to the backup computer due to a problem with the active computer's flash memory, which resulted in the computer continuously rebooting in a loop. The backup computer was turned on in safe mode and subsequently returned to active status on March 4, 2013. The same problem happened in late March, resuming full operations on March 25, 2013.

The rover has an inertial measurement unit (IMU) that provides 3-axis information on its position, which is used in rover navigation. The rover's computers are constantly self-monitoring to keep the rover operational, such as by regulating the rover's temperature. Activities such as taking pictures, driving, and operating the instruments are performed in a command sequence that is sent from the flight team to the rover. The rover installed its full surface operations software after the landing because its computers did not have sufficient main memory available during flight. The new software essentially replaced the flight software.

The rover has four processors. One of them is a SPARC processor that runs the rover's thrusters and descent-stage motors as it descended through the Martian atmosphere. Two others are PowerPC processors: the main processor, which handles nearly all of the rover's ground functions, and that processor's backup. The fourth one, another SPARC processor, commands the rover's movement and is part of its motor controller box. All four processors are single core.

=== Communications ===
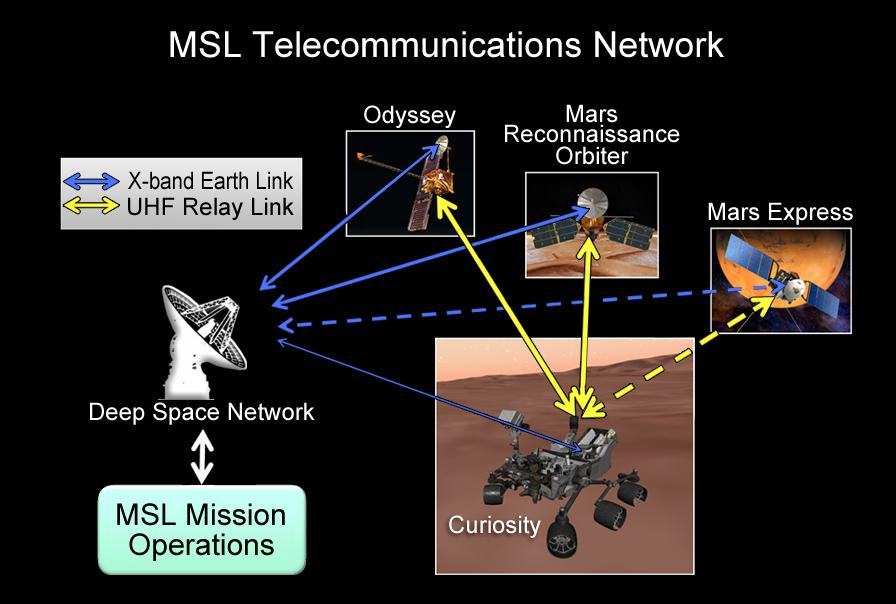
Curiosity transmits to Earth directly or via three relay satellites in Mars orbit.

- Communications: Curiosity is equipped with significant telecommunication redundancy by several means: an X band transmitter and receiver that can communicate directly with Earth, and an Ultra high frequency (UHF) Electra-Lite software-defined radio for communicating with Mars orbiters. Communication with orbiters is the main path for data return to Earth, since the orbiters have both more power and larger antennas than the lander, allowing for faster transmission speeds. Telecommunication included a small deep space transponder on the descent stage and a solid-state power amplifier on the rover for X-band. The rover also has two UHF radios, the signals of which orbiting relay satellites are capable of relaying back to Earth. Signals between Earth and Mars take an average of 14 minutes, 6 seconds. Curiosity can communicate with Earth directly at speeds up to 32 kbit/s, but the bulk of the data transfer is being relayed through the Mars Reconnaissance Orbiter and Odyssey orbiter. Data transfer speeds between Curiosity and each orbiter may reach 2000 kbit/s and 256 kbit/s, respectively, but each orbiter is able to communicate with Curiosity for only about eight minutes per day (0.56% of the time). Communication from and to Curiosity relies on internationally agreed space data communications protocols as defined by the Consultative Committee for Space Data Systems.

Jet Propulsion Laboratory (JPL) is the central data distribution hub where selected data products are provided to remote science operations sites as needed. JPL is also the central hub for the uplink process, though participants are distributed at their respective home institutions. At landing, telemetry was monitored by three orbiters, depending on their dynamic location: the 2001 Mars Odyssey, Mars Reconnaissance Orbiter and ESA's Mars Express satellite. As of February 2019, the MAVEN orbiter is being positioned to serve as a relay orbiter while continuing its science mission.

=== Mobility systems ===
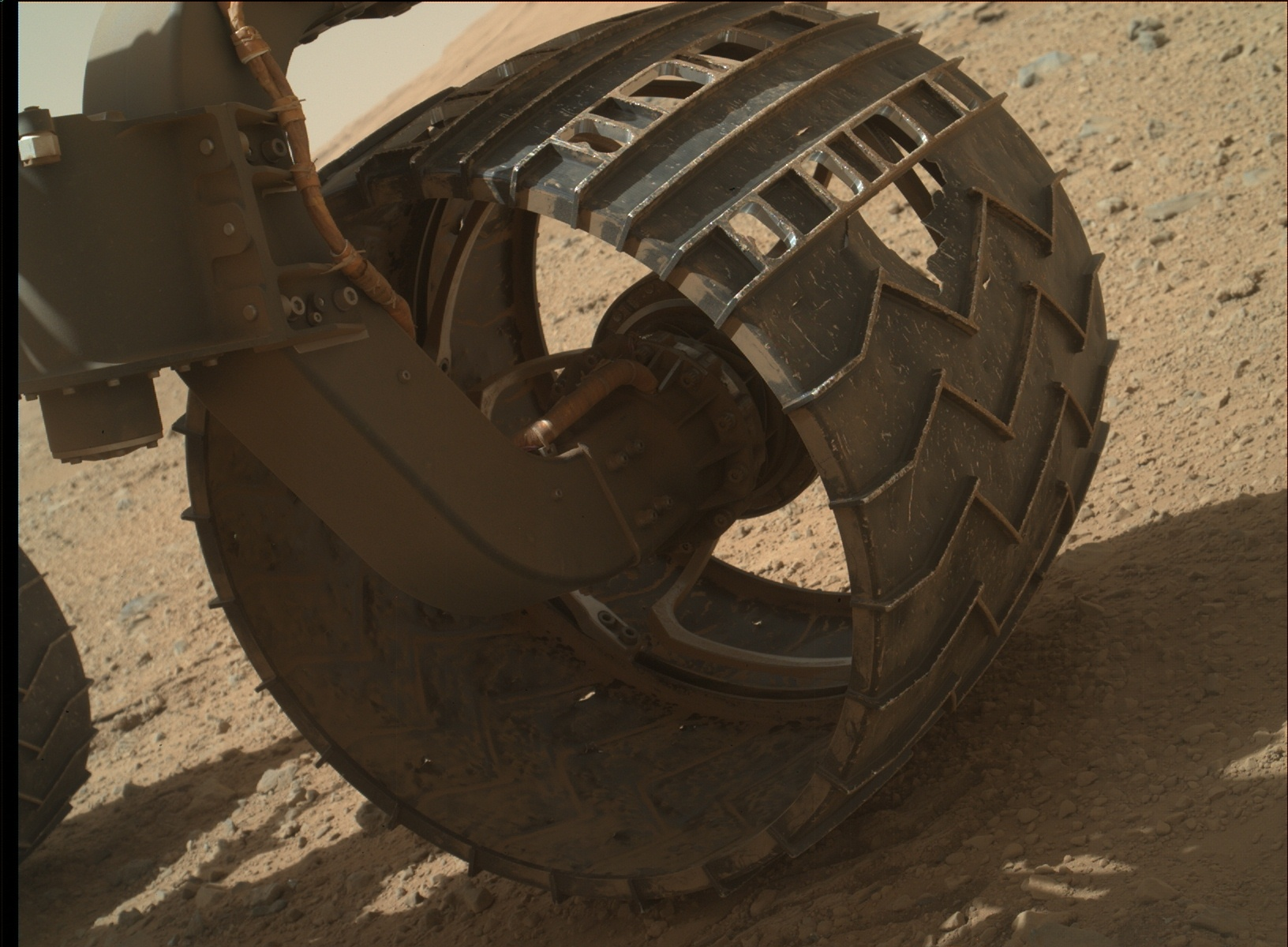
Close-up view of a well-worn wheel on the surface, which also shows the Morse code pattern for JPL.

- Mobility systems: Curiosity is equipped with six 50-centimetre-diameter (20 in) wheels in a rocker-bogie suspension. These are scaled versions of those used on Mars Exploration Rovers (MER). The suspension system also served as landing gear for the vehicle, unlike its smaller predecessors. Each wheel has cleats and is independently actuated and geared, providing for climbing in soft sand and scrambling over rocks. Each front and rear wheel can be independently steered, allowing the vehicle to turn in place as well as execute arcing turns. Each wheel has a pattern that helps it maintain traction but also leaves patterned tracks in the sandy surface of Mars. That pattern is used by on-board cameras to estimate the distance traveled. The pattern itself is Morse code for "JPL" (·--- ·--· ·-··), This pattern was selected by JPL engineers due to NASA not allowing "JPL" to be imprinted to the wheels as text. The rover is capable of climbing sand dunes with slopes up to 12.5°. Based on the center of mass, the vehicle can withstand a tilt of at least 50° in any direction without overturning, but automatic sensors limit the rover from exceeding 30° tilts. After six years of use, the wheels are visibly worn with punctures and tears.

Curiosity can roll over obstacles approaching 65 cm (26 in) in height, and it has a ground clearance of 60 cm (24 in). Based on variables including power levels, terrain difficulty, slippage and visibility, the maximum terrain-traverse speed is estimated to be 200 m (660 ft) per day by automatic navigation. The rover landed about 10 km (6.2 mi) from the base of Mount Sharp, (officially named Aeolis Mons) and it is expected to traverse a minimum of 19 km (12 mi) during its primary two-year mission. It can travel up to 90 m (300 ft) per hour but average speed is about 30 m (98 ft) per hour. The vehicle is 'driven' by several operators led by Vandi Verma, group leader of Autonomous Systems, Mobility and Robotic Systems at JPL, who also cowrote the PLEXIL language used to operate the rover.

=== Landing ===
Descent of Curiosity (video-02:26; August 6, 2012)

Curiosity landed in Quad 51 (nicknamed Yellowknife) of Aeolis Palus in the crater Gale. The landing site coordinates are: 4.5895°S 137.4417°E. The location was named Bradbury Landing on August 22, 2012, in honor of science fiction author Ray Bradbury. Gale, an estimated 3.5 to 3.8 billion-year-old impact crater, is hypothesized to have first been gradually filled in by sediments; first water-deposited, and then wind-deposited, possibly until it was completely covered. Wind erosion then scoured out the sediments, leaving an isolated 5.5 km (3.4 mi) mountain, Aeolis Mons ("Mount Sharp"), at the center of the 154 km (96 mi) wide crater. Thus, it is believed that the rover may have the opportunity to study two billion years of Martian history in the sediments exposed in the mountain. Additionally, its landing site is near an alluvial fan, which is hypothesized to be the result of a flow of ground water, either before the deposition of the eroded sediments or else in relatively recent geologic history.

According to NASA, an estimated 20,000 to 40,000 heat-resistant bacterial spores were on Curiosity at launch, and as many as 1,000 times that number may not have been counted.

=== Rover's landing system ===
NASA video describing the landing procedure. NASA dubbed the landing as "Seven Minutes of Terror"

Previous NASA Mars rovers became active only after the successful entry, descent and landing on the Martian surface. Curiosity, on the other hand, was active when it touched down on the surface of Mars, employing the rover suspension system for the final set-down.

Curiosity transformed from its stowed flight configuration to a landing configuration while the MSL spacecraft simultaneously lowered it beneath the spacecraft descent stage with a 20 m (66 ft) tether from the "sky crane" system to a soft landing – wheels down – on the surface of Mars. After the rover touched down it waited two seconds to confirm that it was on solid ground then fired several pyrotechnic fasteners activating cable cutters on the bridle to free itself from the spacecraft descent stage. The descent stage then flew away to a crash landing, and the rover prepared itself to begin the science portion of the mission.

==== Travel status ====
As of August 16, 2024, the rover had driven 35.5 km (22.1 mi) from its landing site. As of November 15, 2026 it has driven 36.86 km (22.90 mi) from its landing site over 5075 sols (Martian days), and as of January 2025, its elevation had changed over 740 m (2,430 ft) upward.

=== Duplicate testing rovers ===
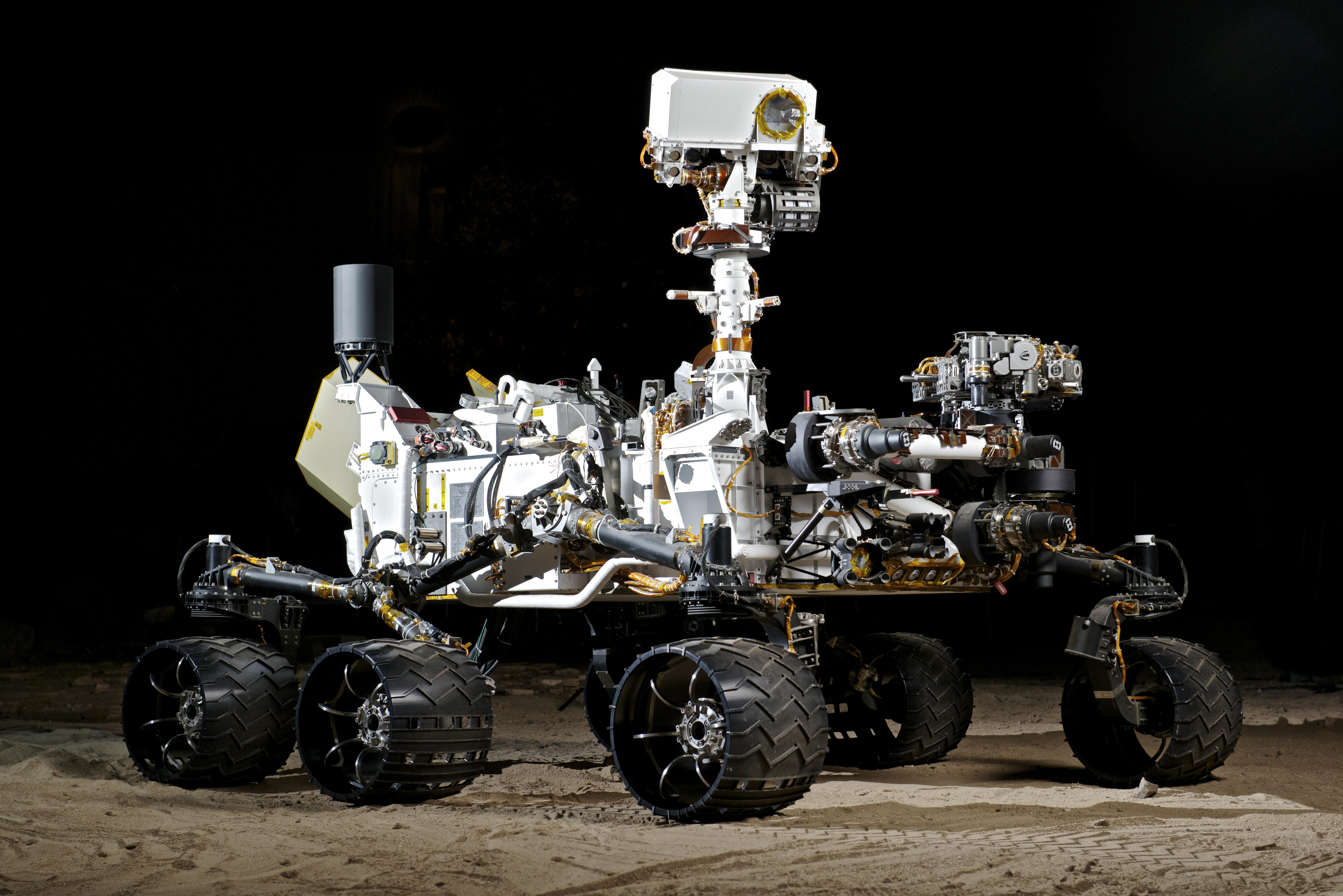
MAGGIE

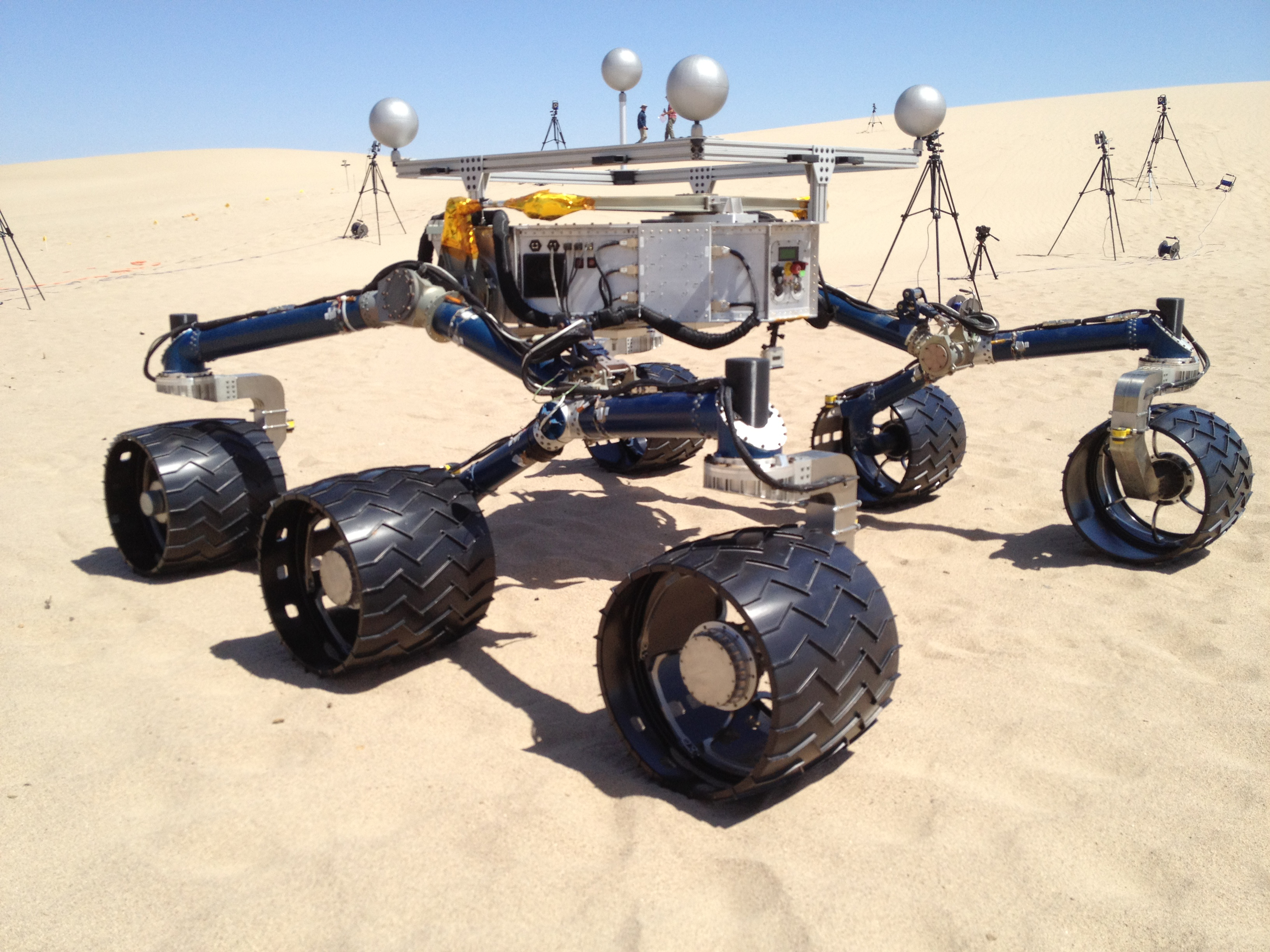
Scarecrow

Curiosity has two full sized vehicle system test beds (VSTBs), twin rovers used for testing and problem solving: MAGGIE (Mars Automated Giant Gizmo for Integrated Engineering), which has been renamed to PROMISE, with a computer brain, and Scarecrow, without a brain. They are housed at the JPL Mars Yard for problem solving on simulated Mars terrain.

== Scientific instruments ==
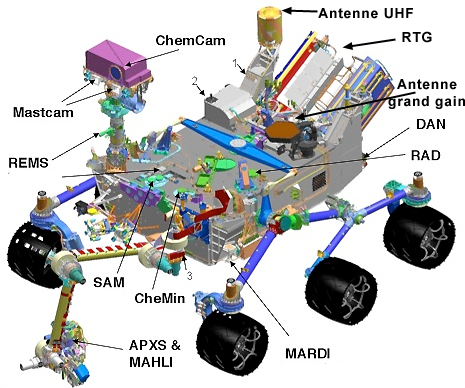
Instrument location diagram

The general sample analysis strategy begins with high-resolution cameras to look for features of interest. If a particular surface is of interest, Curiosity can vaporize a small portion of it with an infrared laser and examine the resulting spectra signature to query the rock's elemental composition. If that signature is intriguing, the rover uses its long arm to swing over a microscope and an X-ray spectrometer to take a closer look. If the specimen warrants further analysis, Curiosity can drill into the boulder and deliver a powdered sample to either the Sample Analysis at Mars (SAM) or the CheMin analytical laboratories inside the rover.

The MastCam, Mars Hand Lens Imager (MAHLI), and Mars Descent Imager (MARDI) cameras were developed by Malin Space Science Systems and they all share common design components, such as on-board digital image processing boxes, 1600 × 1200 charge-coupled device (CCDs), and an RGB Bayer pattern filter.

In total, the rover carries 17 cameras: HazCams (8), NavCams (4), MastCams (2), MAHLI (1), MARDI (1), and ChemCam (1).

=== Mast Camera (Mastcam) ===
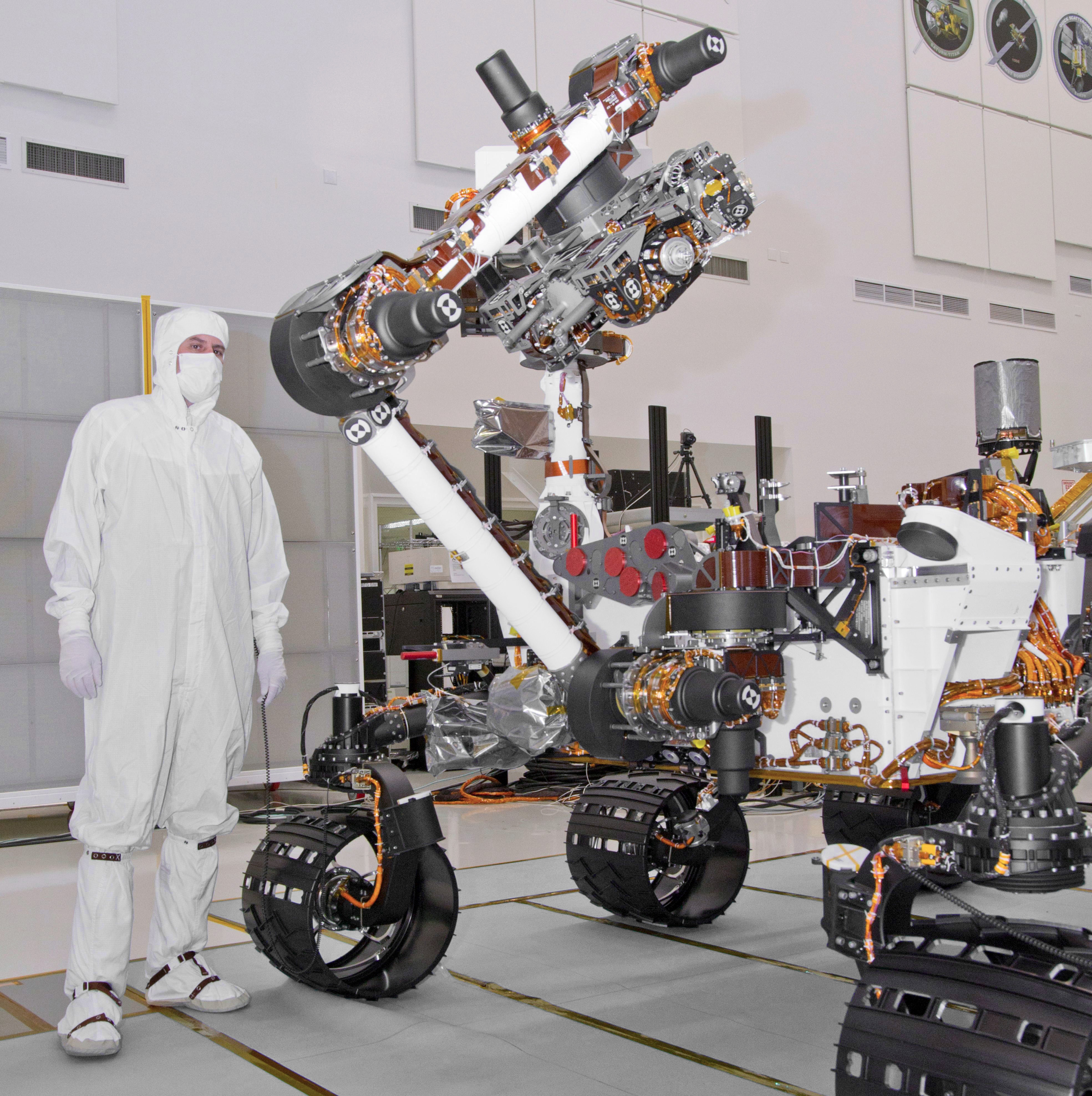
The turret at the end of the robotic arm holds five devices.

The Mastcam system provides multiple spectra and true-color imaging with two cameras. The cameras can take true-color images at 1600×1200 pixels and up to 10 frames per second hardware-compressed video at 720p (1280×720).

One Mastcam camera is the Medium Angle Camera (MAC; also referred to as Mastcam-34 and Mastcam-Left), which has a 34 mm (1.3 in) focal length, a 15° field of view, and can yield 22 cm/pixel (8.7 in/pixel) scale at 1 km (0.62 mi). The other camera in the Mastcam is the Narrow Angle Camera (NAC; also Mastcam-100 and Mastcam-Right), which has a 100 mm (3.9 in) focal length, a 5.1° field of view, and can yield 7.4 cm/pixel (2.9 in/pixel) scale at 1 km (0.62 mi). Malin also developed a pair of Mastcams with zoom lenses, but these were not included in the rover because of the time required to test the new hardware and the looming November 2011 launch date. However, the improved zoom version was selected to be incorporated on the Mars 2020 mission as Mastcam-Z.

Each camera has eight gigabytes of flash memory, which is capable of storing over 5,500 raw images, and can apply real time lossless data compression. The cameras have an autofocus capability that allows them to focus on objects from 2.1 m (6 ft 11 in) to infinity. In addition to the fixed RGBG Bayer pattern filter, each camera has an eight-position filter wheel. While the Bayer filter reduces visible light throughput, all three colors are mostly transparent at wavelengths longer than 700 nm, and have minimal effect on such infrared observations.

=== Chemistry and Camera complex (ChemCam) ===
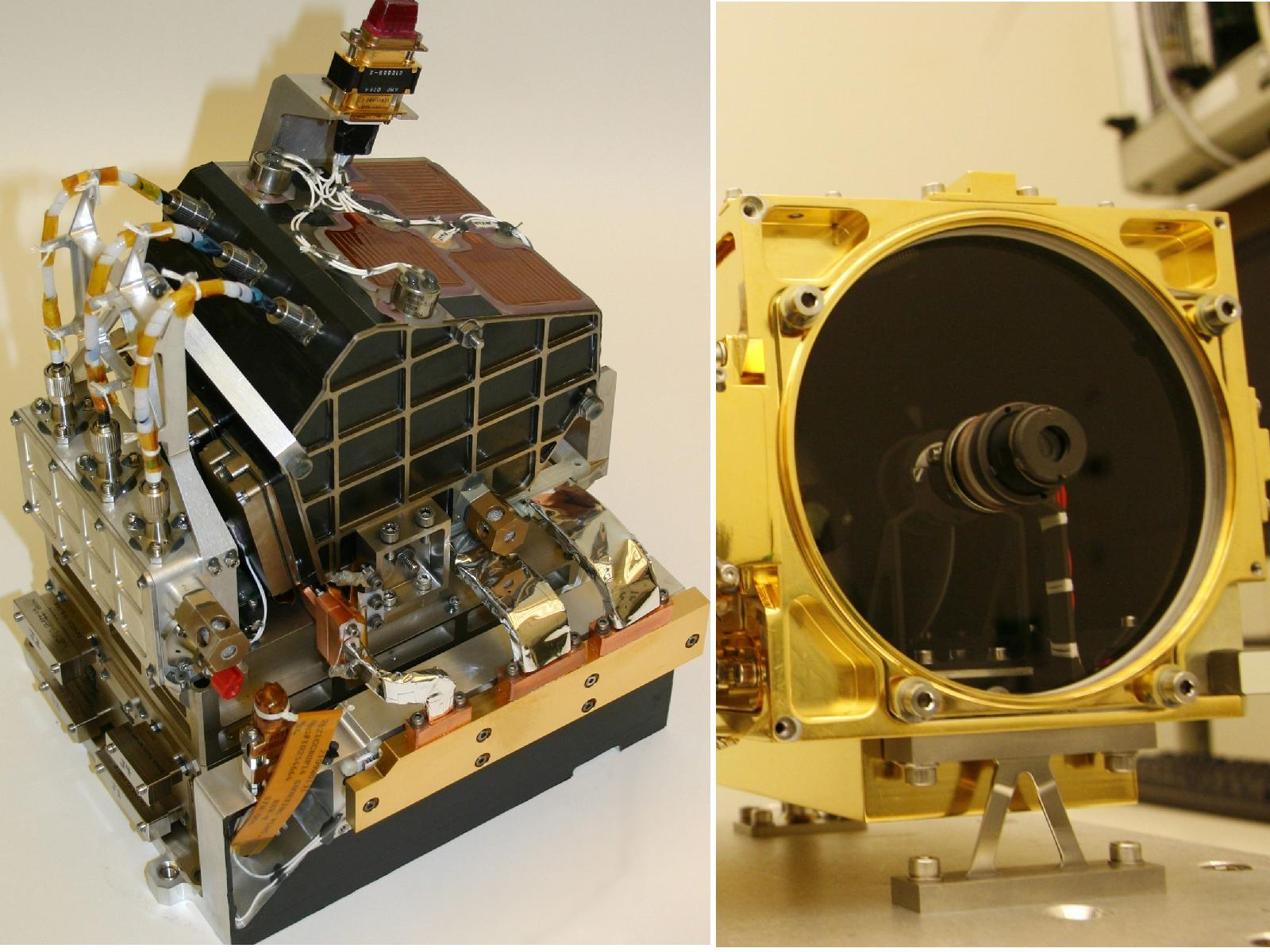
The internal spectrometer (left) and the laser telescope (right) for the mast

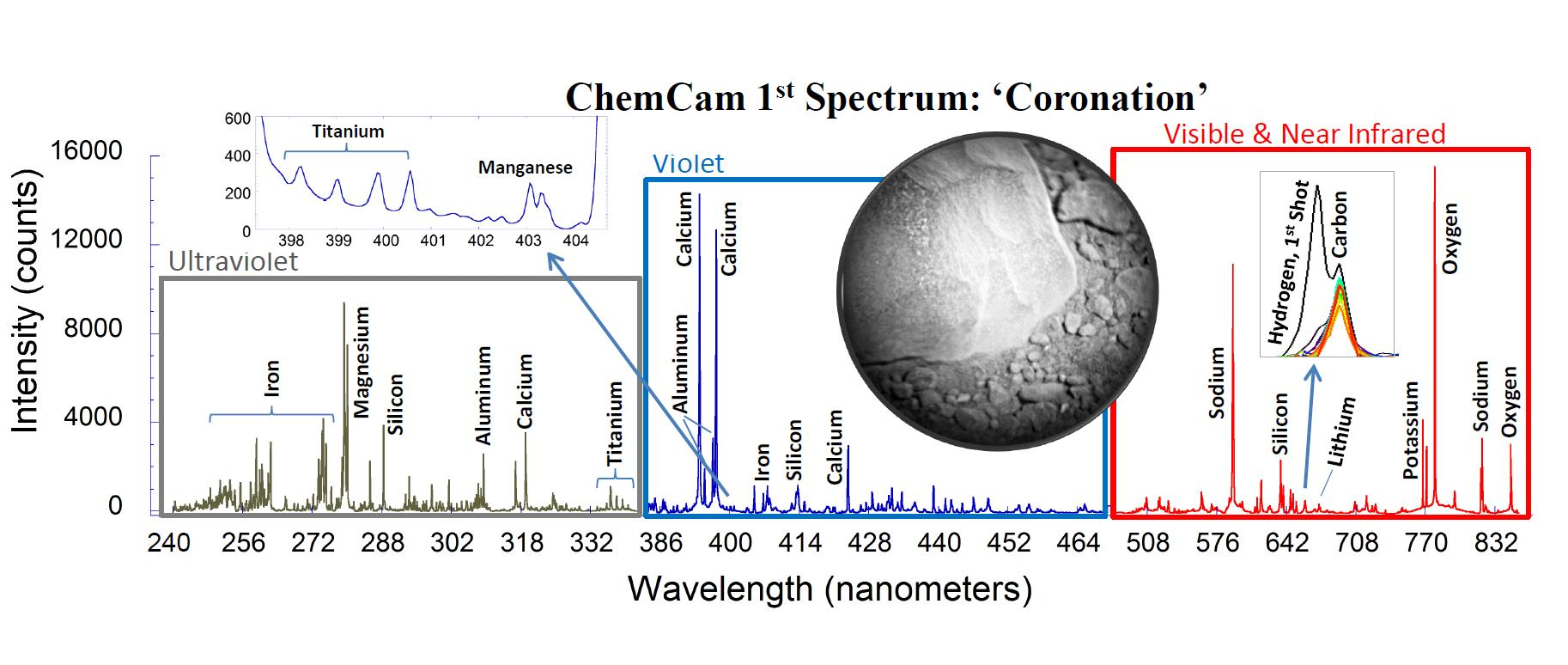
First laser spectrum of chemical elements from ChemCam on Curiosity ("Coronation" rock, August 19, 2012)

ChemCam is a suite of two remote sensing instruments combined as one: a laser-induced breakdown spectroscopy (LIBS) and a Remote Micro Imager (RMI) telescope. The ChemCam instrument suite was developed by the French CESR laboratory and the Los Alamos National Laboratory. The flight model of the mast unit was delivered from the French CNES to Los Alamos National Laboratory. The purpose of the LIBS instrument is to provide elemental compositions of rock and regolith, while the RMI gives ChemCam scientists high-resolution images of the sampling areas of the rocks and regolith that LIBS targets. The LIBS instrument can target a rock or regolith sample up to 7 m (23 ft) away, vaporizing a small amount of it with about 50 to 75 5-nanosecond pulses from a 1067 nm infrared laser and then observes the spectrum of the light emitted by the vaporized rock.

ChemCam has the ability to record up to 6,144 different wavelengths of ultraviolet, visible, and infrared light. Detection of the ball of luminous plasma is done in the visible, near-UV and near-infrared ranges, between 240 nm and 800 nm. The first initial laser testing of the ChemCam by Curiosity on Mars was performed on a rock, N165 ("Coronation" rock), near Bradbury Landing on August 19, 2012. The ChemCam team expects to take approximately one dozen compositional measurements of rocks per day. Using the same collection optics, the RMI provides context images of the LIBS analysis spots. The RMI resolves 1 mm (0.039 in) objects at 10 m (33 ft) distance, and has a field of view covering 20 cm (7.9 in) at that distance.

=== Navigation cameras (Navcams) ===
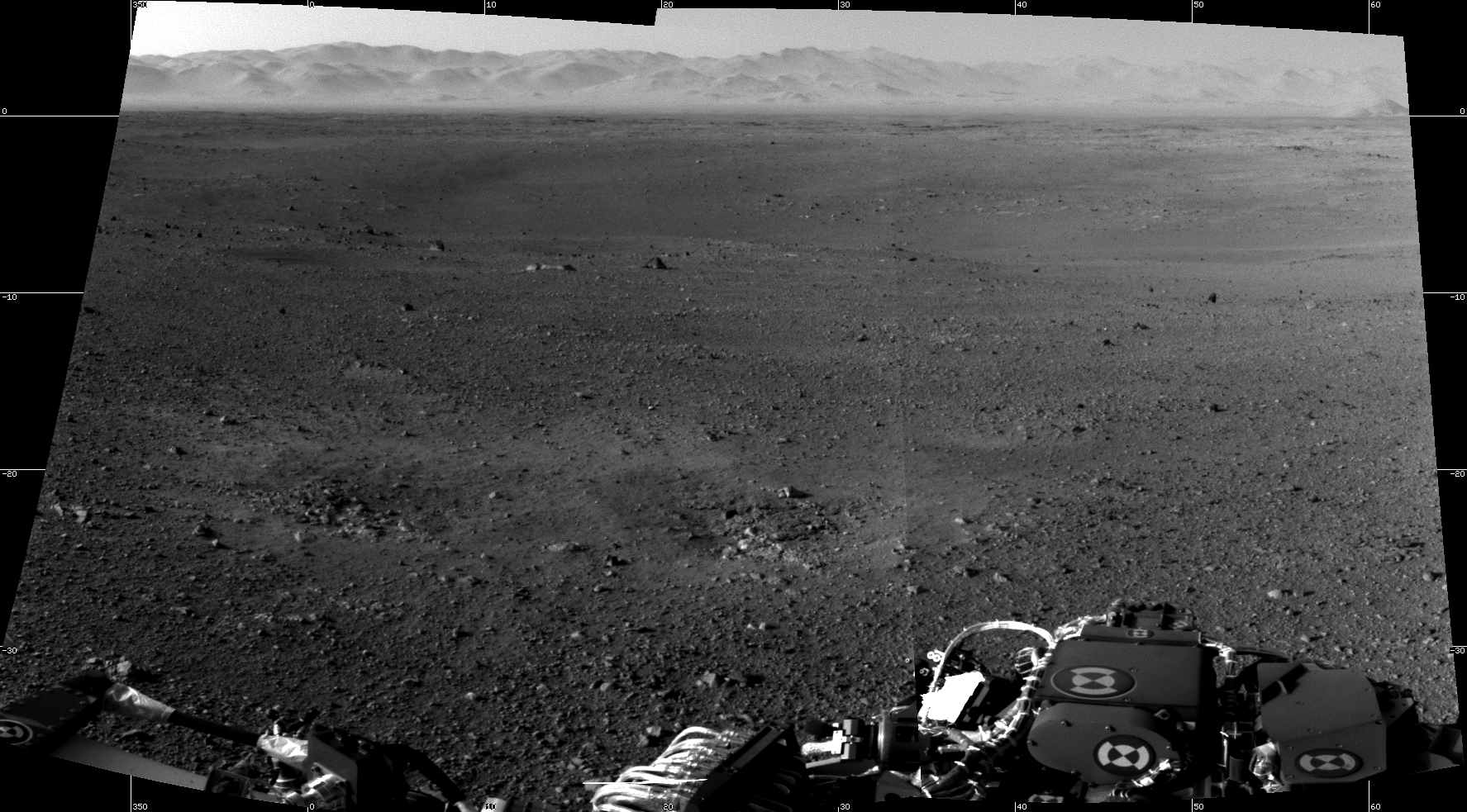
First full-resolution Navcam images

The rover has two pairs of black and white navigation cameras mounted on the mast to support ground navigation. The cameras have a 45° angle of view and use visible light to capture stereoscopic 3D imagery.

=== Rover Environmental Monitoring Station (REMS) ===
REMS comprises instruments to measure the Mars environment: humidity, pressure, temperatures, wind speeds, and ultraviolet radiation. It is a meteorological package that includes an ultraviolet sensor provided by the Spanish Ministry of Education and Science. The investigative team is led by Javier Gómez-Elvira of the Spanish Astrobiology Center and includes the Finnish Meteorological Institute as a partner. All sensors are located around three elements: two booms attached to the rover's mast, the Ultraviolet Sensor (UVS) assembly located on the rover top deck, and the Instrument Control Unit (ICU) inside the rover body. REMS provides new clues about the Martian general circulation, micro scale weather systems, local hydrological cycle, destructive potential of UV radiation, and subsurface habitability based on ground-atmosphere interaction.

=== Hazard avoidance cameras (Hazcams) ===
The rover has four pairs of black and white navigation cameras called hazcams, two pairs in the front and two pairs in the back. They are used for autonomous hazard avoidance during rover drives and for safe positioning of the robotic arm on rocks and regolith. Each camera in a pair is hardlinked to one of two identical main computers for redundancy; only four out of the eight cameras are in use at any one time. The cameras use visible light to capture stereoscopic three-dimensional imagery. The cameras have a 120° field of view and map the terrain at up to 3 m (9.8 ft) in front of the rover. This imagery safeguards against the rover crashing into unexpected obstacles, and works in tandem with software that allows the rover to make its own safety choices.

=== Mars Hand Lens Imager (MAHLI) ===
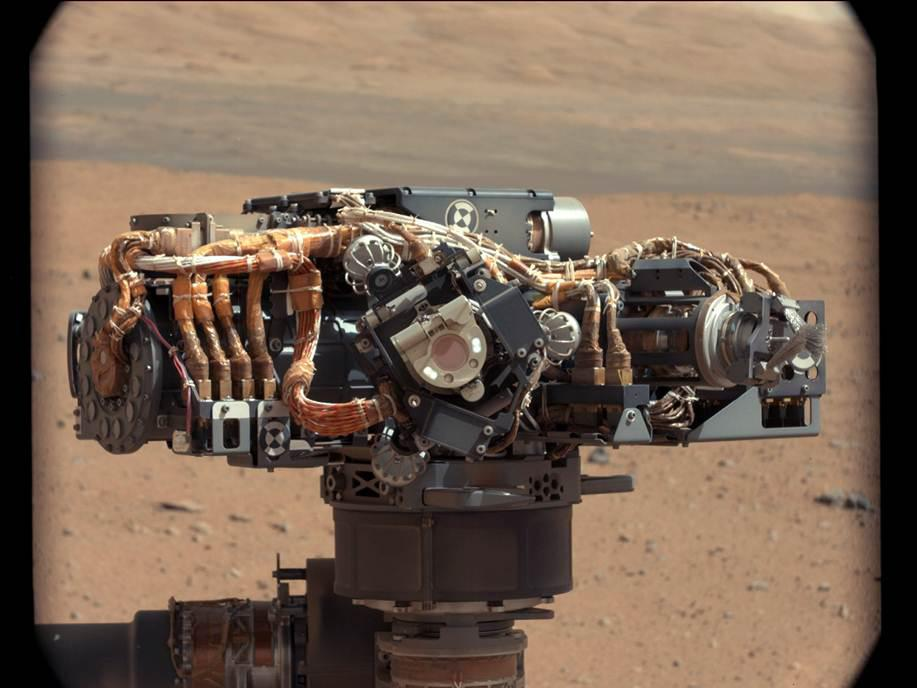
Mars Hand Lens Imager (MAHLI)

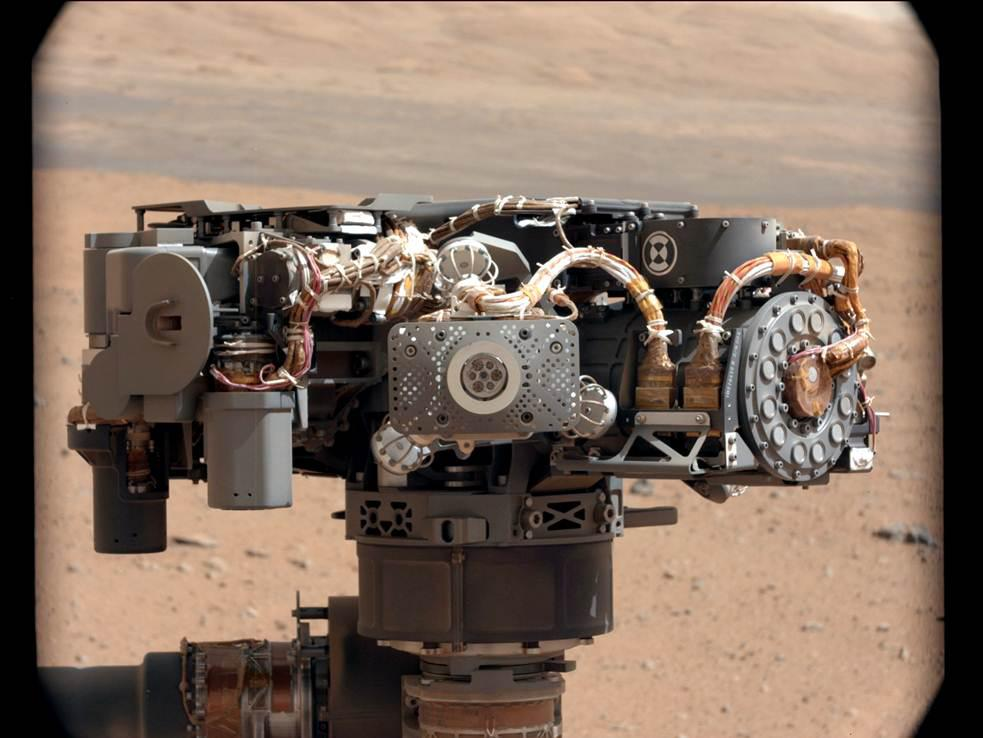
Alpha Particle X-Ray Spectrometer (APXS)

MAHLI is a camera on the rover's robotic arm, and acquires microscopic images of rock and regolith. MAHLI can take true-color images at 1600×1200 pixels with a resolution as high as 14.5 µm per pixel. MAHLI has an 18.3 to 21.3 mm (0.72 to 0.84 in) focal length and a 33.8–38.5° field of view. MAHLI has both white and ultraviolet Light-emitting diode (LED) illumination for imaging in darkness or fluorescence imaging. MAHLI also has mechanical focusing in a range from infinite to millimeter distances. This system can make some images with focus stacking processing. MAHLI can store either the raw images or do real time lossless predictive or JPEG compression. The calibration target for MAHLI includes color references, a metric bar graphic, a 1909 VDB Lincoln penny, and a stair-step pattern for depth calibration.

=== Alpha Particle X-ray Spectrometer (APXS) ===
The APXS instrument irradiates samples with alpha particles and maps the spectra of X-rays that are re-emitted for determining the elemental composition of samples. Curiosity's APXS was developed by the Canadian Space Agency (CSA). MacDonald Dettwiler (MDA), the Canadian aerospace company that built the Canadarm and RADARSAT, were responsible for the engineering design and building of the APXS. The APXS science team includes members from the University of Guelph, the University of New Brunswick, the University of Western Ontario, NASA, the University of California, San Diego and Cornell University. The APXS instrument takes advantage of particle-induced X-ray emission (PIXE) and X-ray fluorescence, previously exploited by the Mars Pathfinder and the two Mars Exploration Rovers.

=== Chemistry and Mineralogy (CheMin) ===
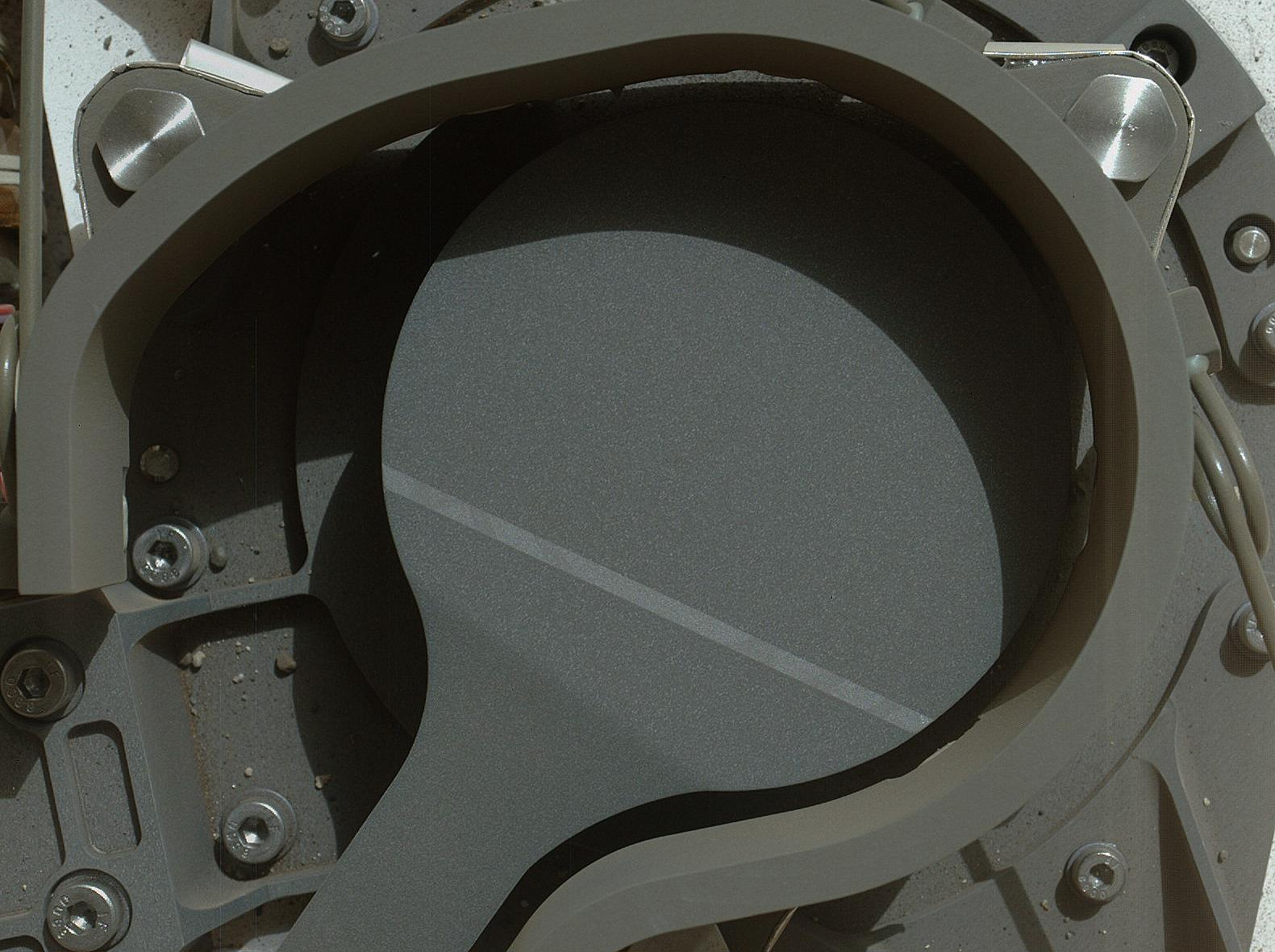
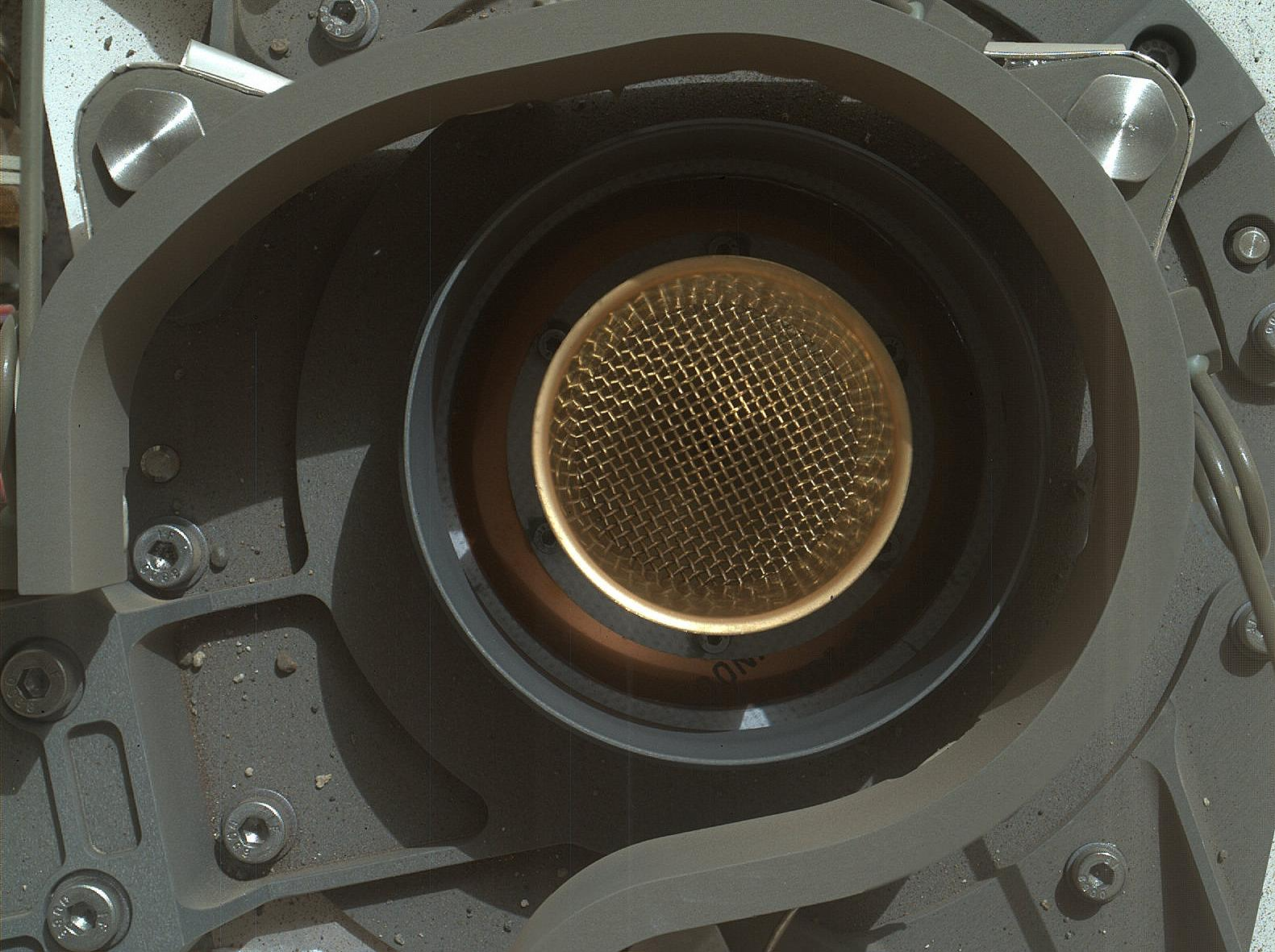
Curiosity's CheMin Spectrometer on Mars (September 11, 2012), with sample inlet seen closed and open

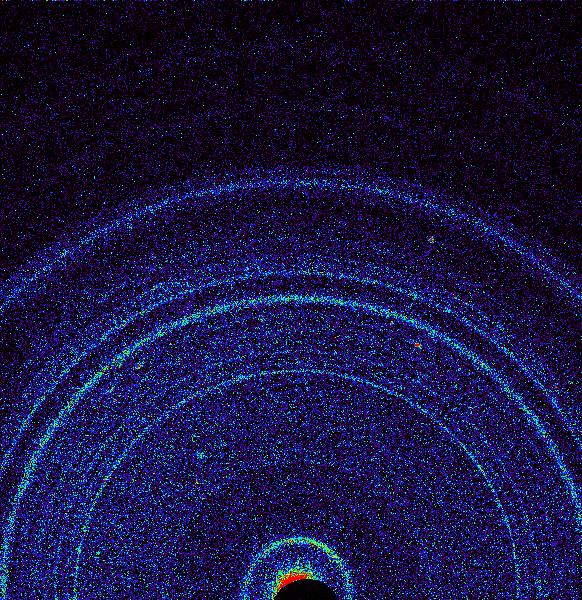
First X-ray diffraction view of Martian regolith (Curiosity at Rocknest, October 17, 2012)

CheMin is the Chemistry and Mineralogy X-ray powder diffraction and fluorescence instrument. CheMin is one of four spectrometers. It can identify and quantify the abundance of the minerals on Mars. It was developed by David Blake at NASA Ames Research Center and the Jet Propulsion Laboratory, and won the 2013 NASA Government Invention of the year award. The rover can drill samples from rocks and the resulting fine powder is poured into the instrument via a sample inlet tube on the top of the vehicle. A beam of X-rays is then directed at the powder and the crystal structure of the minerals deflects it at characteristic angles, allowing scientists to identify the minerals being analyzed.

On October 17, 2012, at "Rocknest", the first X-ray diffraction analysis of Martian regolith was performed. The results revealed the presence of several minerals, including feldspar, pyroxenes and olivine, and suggested that the Martian regolith in the sample was similar to the "weathered basaltic soils" of Hawaiian volcanoes. The paragonetic tephra from a Hawaiian cinder cone has been mined to create Martian regolith simulant for researchers to use since 1998.

CheMin eventually found carbonates in the form of crystalline siderite (FeCO_{3}). One rock contained over 10% of the mineral. Some rocks also were composed of plagioclase with the elements sodium (Na)–, Ca-, and aluminum (Al)–, as well as Ca- and Mg-bearing silicate mineral pyroxene. Other minerals found were calcium sulfates, magnesium sulfates, different amounts of iron oxyhydroxides, and an unidentified x-ray amorphous material. Rover's Chemistry and Mineralogy (CheMin) instrument uses x-ray diffraction to determine sample mineralogy. The names of the rock formations and drill sites are CA, Canaima; TC, Tapo Caparo; UB, Ubajara; and SQ, Sequoia. V

=== Sample Analysis at Mars (SAM) ===
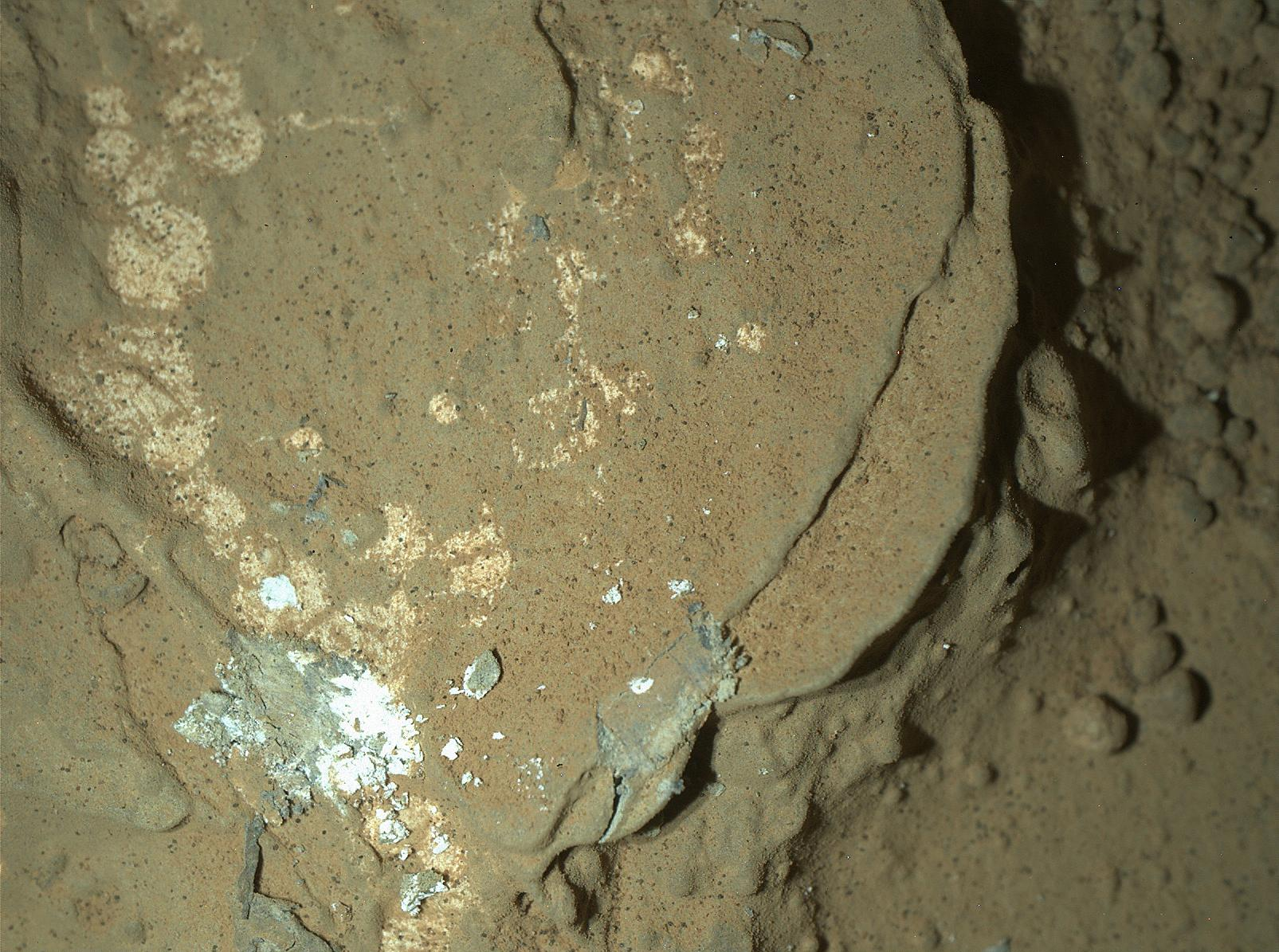
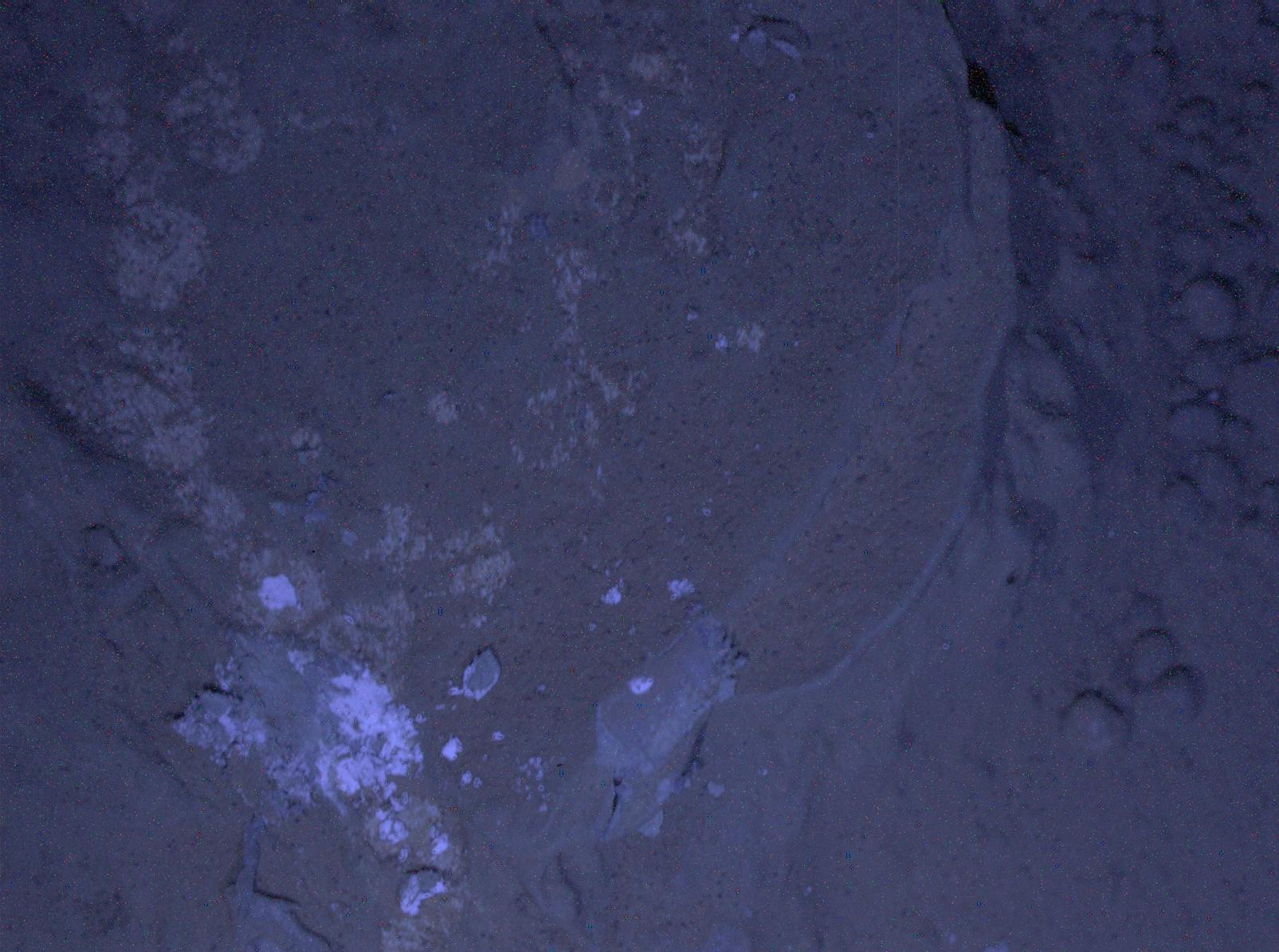
First night-time pictures on Mars (white-light left/UV right) (Curiosity viewing Sayunei rock, January 22, 2013)

The SAM instrument suite analyzes organics and gases from both atmospheric and solid samples. It consists of instruments developed by the NASA Goddard Space Flight Center, the NASA Jet Propulsion Laboratory the Laboratoire atmosphères, milieux, observations spatiales (LATMOS), the Laboratoire Inter-Universitaire des Systèmes Atmosphériques (LISA) (jointly operated by France's CNRS and Parisian universities), and Honeybee Robotics, along with many additional external partners. The three main instruments are a Quadrupole Mass Spectrometer (QMS), a gas chromatograph (GC) and a tunable laser spectrometer (TLS). These instruments perform precision measurements of oxygen and carbon isotope ratios in carbon dioxide (CO_{2}) and methane (CH_{4}) in the atmosphere in order to distinguish between their geochemical or biological origin.

Sample Analysis at Mars (SAM) discovered over 20 organic molecules from clay-bearing sandstones. The molecules were in the ~3.5-billion-year-old Knockfarrill Hill member of Glen Torridon, Gale crater. It cannot be determined how these molecules were made. They could be exogenous (e.g., meteoritic, cometary, or interplanetary dust particles) or endogenous (e.g., abiotically or biologically produced).

=== Dust Removal Tool (DRT) ===
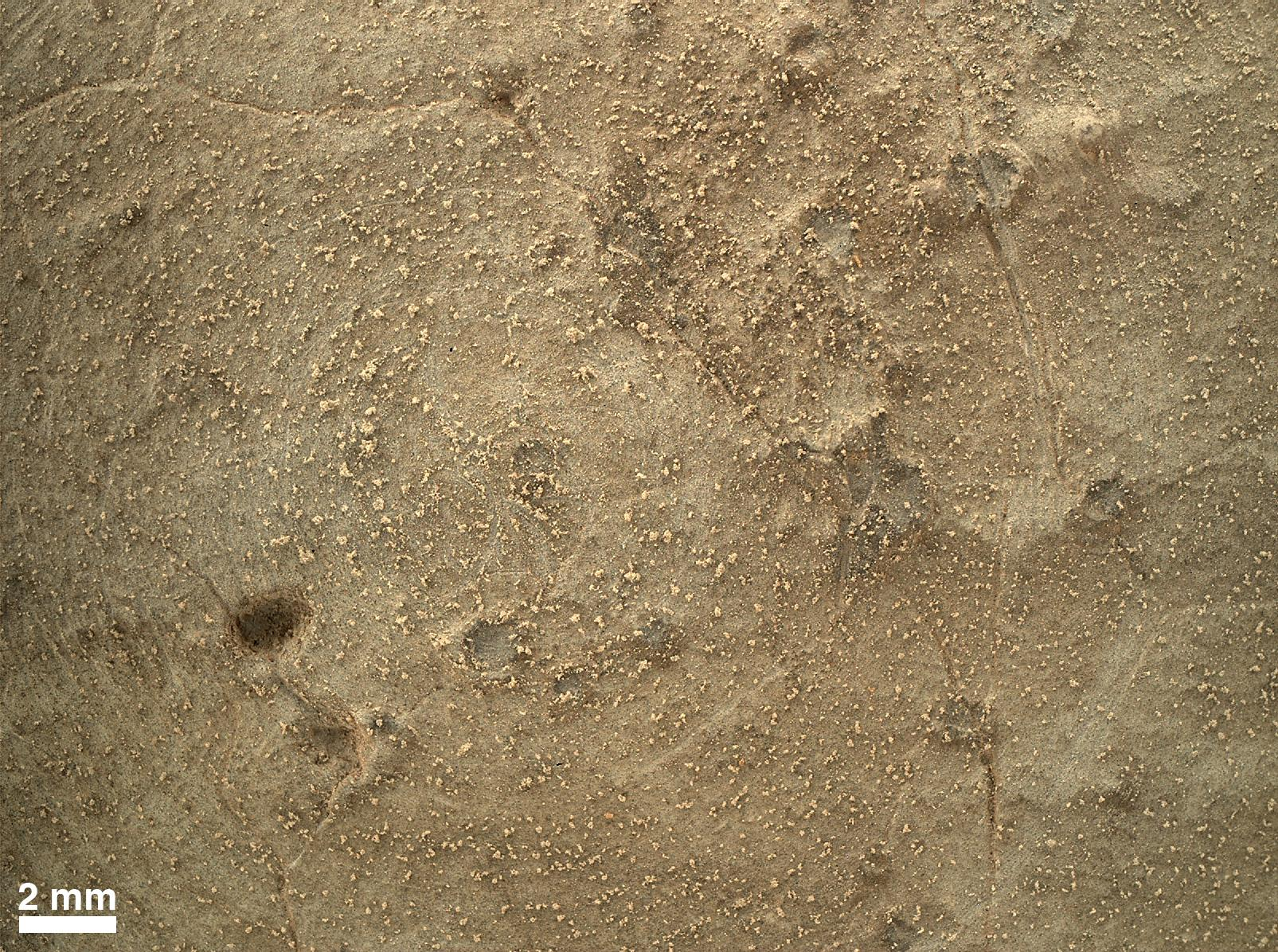
First use of Curiosity's Dust Removal Tool (DRT) (January 6, 2013); Ekwir_1 rock before/after cleaning (left) and closeup (right)

The Dust Removal Tool (DRT) is a motorized, wire-bristle brush on the turret at the end of Curiosity's arm. The DRT was first used on a rock target named Ekwir_1 on January 6, 2013. Honeybee Robotics built the DRT.

=== Radiation assessment detector (RAD) ===
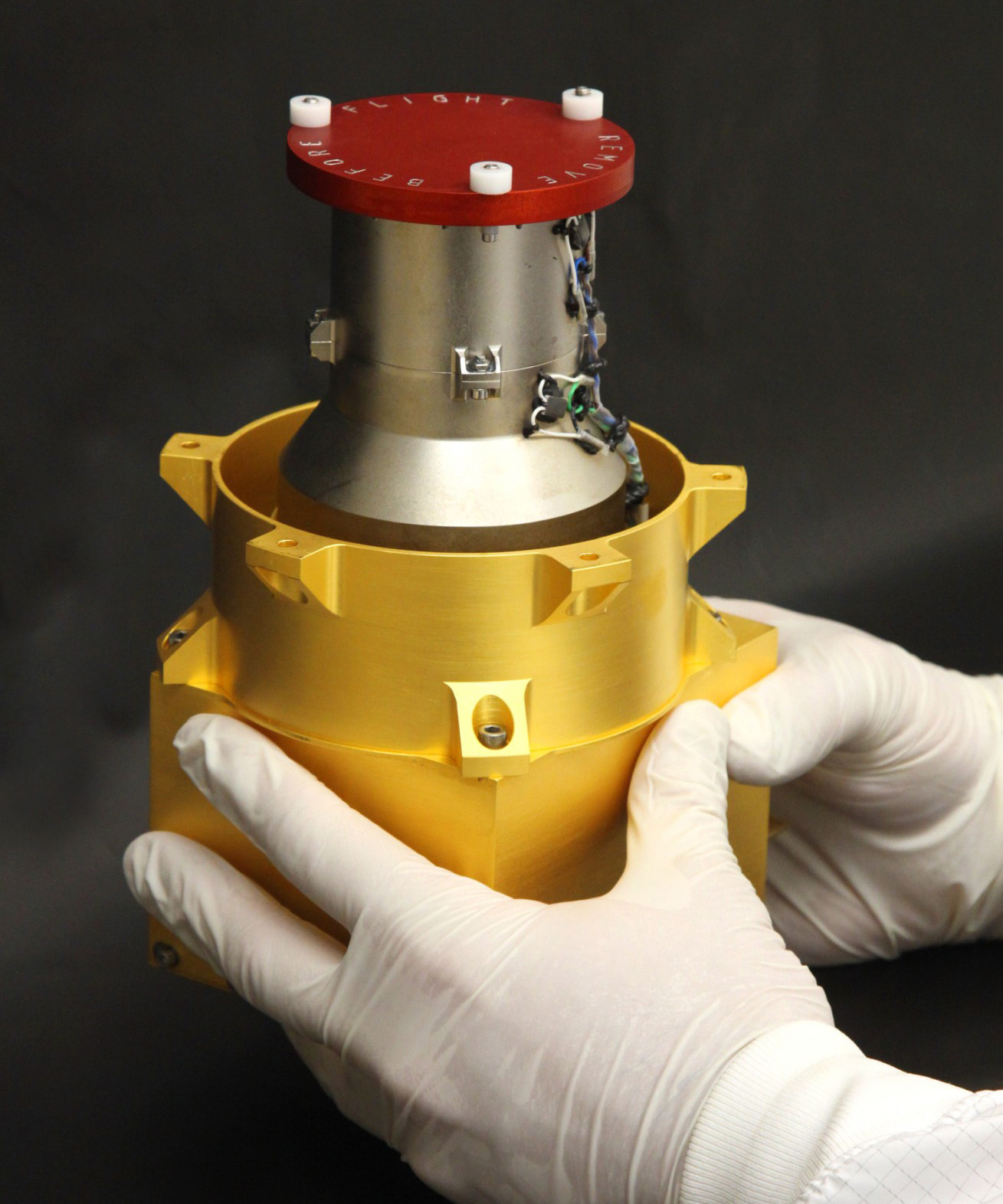
A lab tech holding the RAD, only the top rim of which is visible from outside the rover body

The role of the Radiation assessment detector (RAD) instrument is to characterize the broad spectrum of radiation environment found inside the spacecraft during the cruise phase and while on Mars. These measurements have never been done before from the inside of a spacecraft in interplanetary space. Its primary purpose is to determine the viability and shielding needs for potential human explorers, as well as to characterize the radiation environment on the surface of Mars, which it started doing immediately after MSL landed in August 2012. Funded by the Exploration Systems Mission Directorate at NASA Headquarters and Germany's Space Agency (DLR), RAD was developed by Southwest Research Institute (SwRI) and the extraterrestrial physics group at Christian-Albrechts-Universität zu Kiel, Germany.

=== Dynamic Albedo of Neutrons (DAN) ===
The DAN instrument employs a neutron source and detector for measuring the quantity and depth of hydrogen or ice and water at or near the Martian surface. The instrument consists of the detector element (DE) and a 14.1 MeV pulsing neutron generator (PNG). The die-away time of neutrons is measured by the DE after each neutron pulse from the PNG. DAN was provided by the Russian Federal Space Agency and funded by Russia.

=== Mars Descent Imager (MARDI) ===
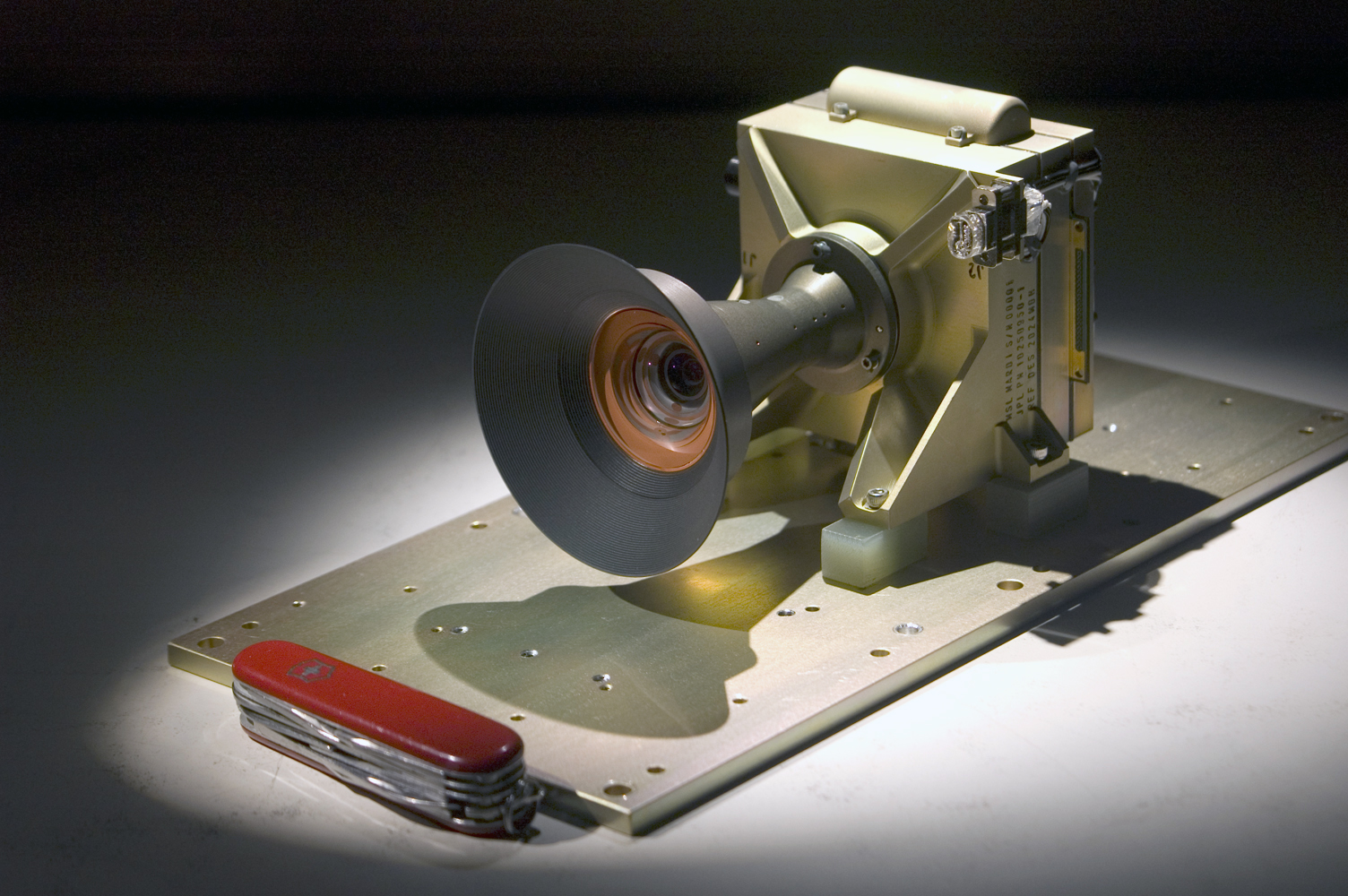
MARDI camera

MARDI is fixed to the lower front left corner of the body of Curiosity. During the descent to the Martian surface, MARDI took color images at 1600×1200 pixels with a 1.3-millisecond exposure time starting at distances of about 3.7 km (2.3 mi) to near 5 m (16 ft) from the ground, at a rate of four frames per second for about two minutes. MARDI has a pixel scale of 1.5 m (4 ft 11 in) at 2 km (1.2 mi) to 1.5 mm (0.059 in) at 2 m (6 ft 7 in) and has a 90° circular field of view. MARDI has eight gigabytes of internal buffer memory that is capable of storing over 4,000 raw images. MARDI imaging allowed the mapping of surrounding terrain and the location of landing. JunoCam, built for the Juno spacecraft, is based on MARDI.

=== Robotic arm ===
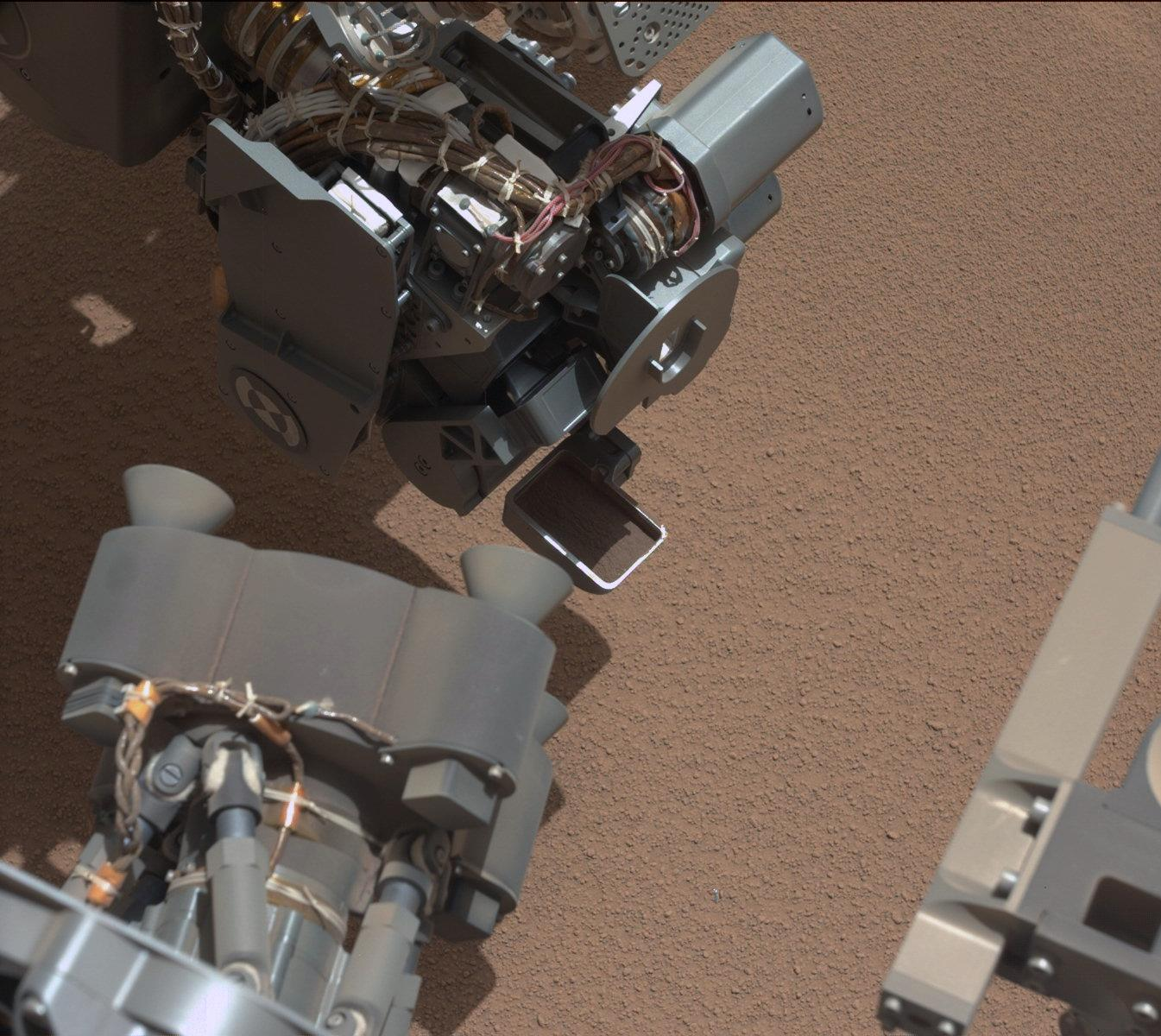
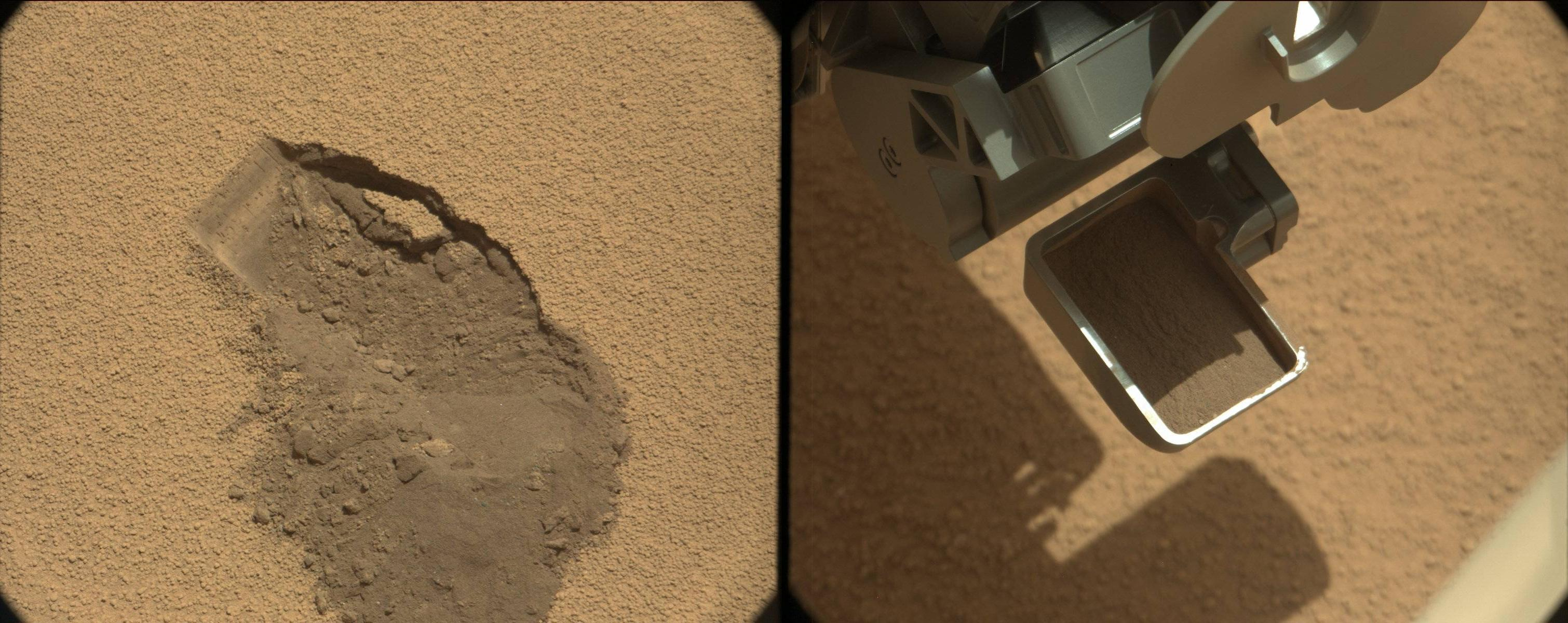
First use of Curiosity's scooper as it sifts a load of sand at Rocknest (October 7, 2012)

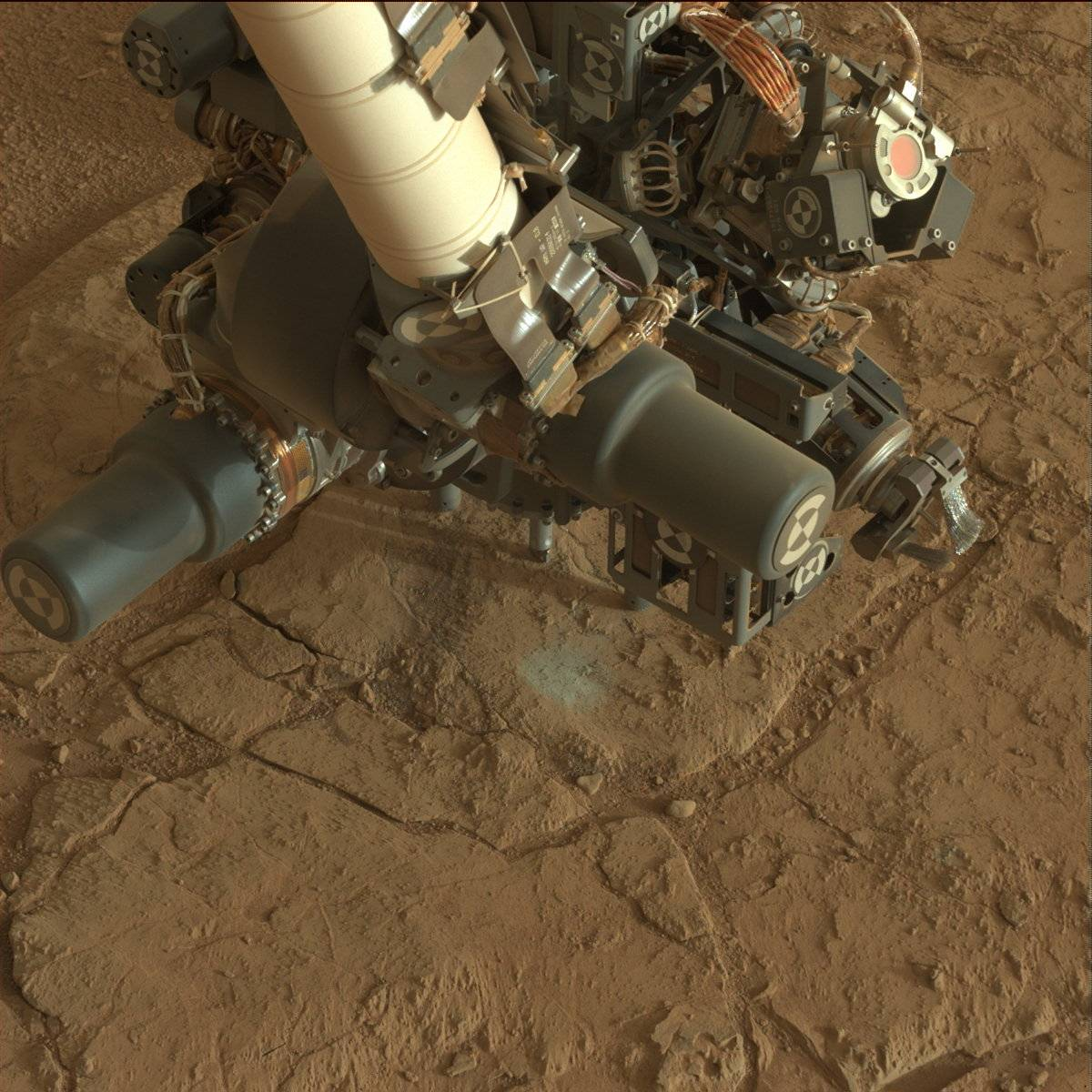
First drill tests (John Klein rock, Yellowknife Bay, February 2, 2013).

The rover has a 2.1 m (6 ft 11 in) long robotic arm with a cross-shaped turret holding five devices that can spin through a 350° turning range. The arm makes use of three joints to extend it forward and to stow it again while driving. It has a mass of 30 kg (66 lb) and its diameter, including the tools mounted on it, is about 60 cm (24 in). It was designed, built, and tested by MDA US Systems, building upon their prior robotic arm work on the Mars Surveyor 2001 Lander, the Phoenix lander, and the two Mars Exploration Rovers, Spirit and Opportunity.

Two of the five devices are in-situ or contact instruments known as the X-ray spectrometer (APXS), and the Mars Hand Lens Imager (MAHLI camera). The remaining three are associated with sample acquisition and sample preparation functions: a percussion drill; a brush; and mechanisms for scooping, sieving, and portioning samples of powdered rock and regolith. The diameter of the hole in a rock after drilling is 1.6 cm (0.63 in) and up to 5 cm (2.0 in) deep. The drill carries two spare bits. The rover's arm and turret system can place the APXS and MAHLI on their respective targets, and also obtain powdered sample from rock interiors, and deliver them to the SAM and CheMin analyzers inside the rover.

Since early 2015 the percussive mechanism in the drill that helps chisel into rock has had an intermittent electrical short. On December 1, 2016, the motor inside the drill caused a malfunction that prevented the rover from moving its robotic arm and driving to another location. The fault was isolated to the drill feed brake, and internal debris is suspected of causing the problem. By December 9, 2016, driving and robotic arm operations were cleared to continue, but drilling remained suspended indefinitely. The Curiosity team continued to perform diagnostics and testing on the drill mechanism throughout 2017, and resumed drilling operations on May 22, 2018.

In 2026 photos showed the percussive drill stuck in a rock, holding it in the air. A later image showed the drill bit dislodged from the rock and broken pieces of rock on the surface. The rover has two extra drill bits, if replacements are needed.

== Select geochemical discoveries ==
As reported in 2018, drill samples taken in 2015 uncovered organic molecules of benzene and propane in 3 billion year old rock samples in Gale.

In March 2024 it was published that Curiosity discovered long chain alkanes with up to 12 consecutive carbon atoms, in mudstone in Gale crater. The origin of these molecules is unknown. They could be derived from either abiotic or biological sources.

In April 2026, scientists announced the discovery of benzothiophene and of benzene rings with amine groups along with other DNA precursors, likely sourced from meteorites, in a sample collected in 2020.

== Media, cultural impact and legacy ==
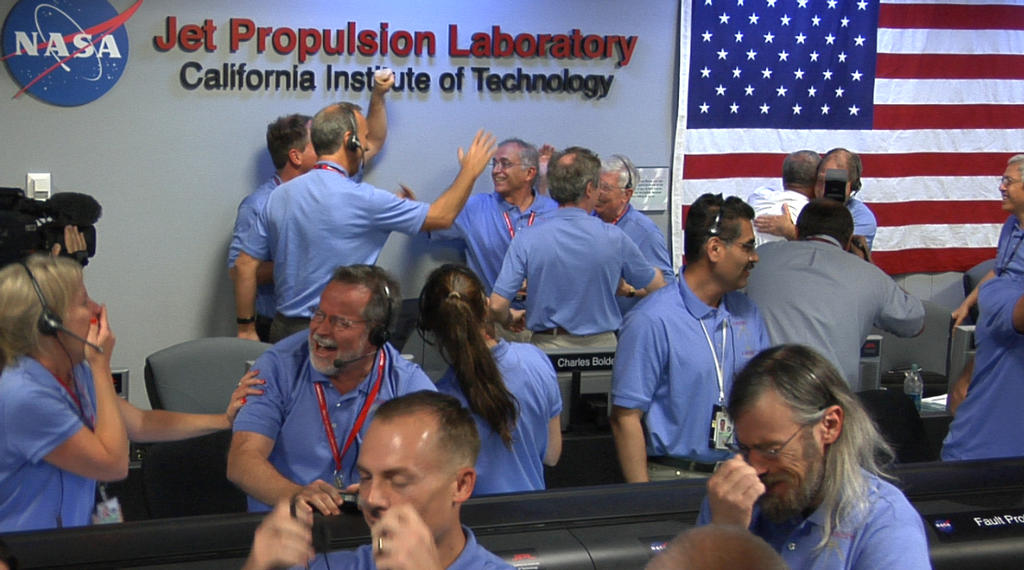
A celebration at NASA when the rover successfully landed on Mars (August 6, 2012).

Live video showing the first footage from the surface of Mars was available at NASA TV, during the late hours of August 6, 2012, PDT, including interviews with the mission team. The NASA website momentarily became unavailable from the overwhelming number of people visiting it, and a 13-minute NASA excerpt of the landings on its YouTube channel was halted an hour after the landing by an automated copyright takedown notice from Scripps Local News, which prevented access for several hours. Around 1,000 people gathered in New York City's Times Square, to watch NASA's live broadcast of Curiosity's landing, as footage was being shown on the giant screen. Bobak Ferdowsi, Flight Director for the landing, became an Internet meme and attained Twitter celebrity status, with 45,000 new followers subscribing to his Twitter account, due to his Mohawk hairstyle with yellow stars that he wore during the televised broadcast.

On August 13, 2012, U.S. President Barack Obama, calling from aboard Air Force One to congratulate the Curiosity team, said, "You guys are examples of American know-how and ingenuity. It's really an amazing accomplishment". (Video (07:20))

Scientists at the Getty Conservation Institute in Los Angeles, California, viewed the CheMin instrument aboard Curiosity as a potentially valuable means to examine ancient works of art without damaging them. Until recently, only a few instruments were available to determine the composition without cutting out physical samples large enough to potentially damage the artifacts. CheMin directs a beam of X-rays at particles as small as 400 μm (0.016 in) and reads the radiation scattered back to determine the composition of the artifact in minutes. Engineers created a smaller, portable version named the X-Duetto. Fitting into a few briefcase-sized boxes, it can examine objects on site, while preserving their physical integrity. It is now being used by Getty scientists to analyze a large collection of museum antiques and the Roman ruins of Herculaneum, Italy.

Prior to the landing, NASA and Microsoft released Mars Rover Landing, a free downloadable game on Xbox Live that uses Kinect to capture body motions, which allows users to simulate the landing sequence.

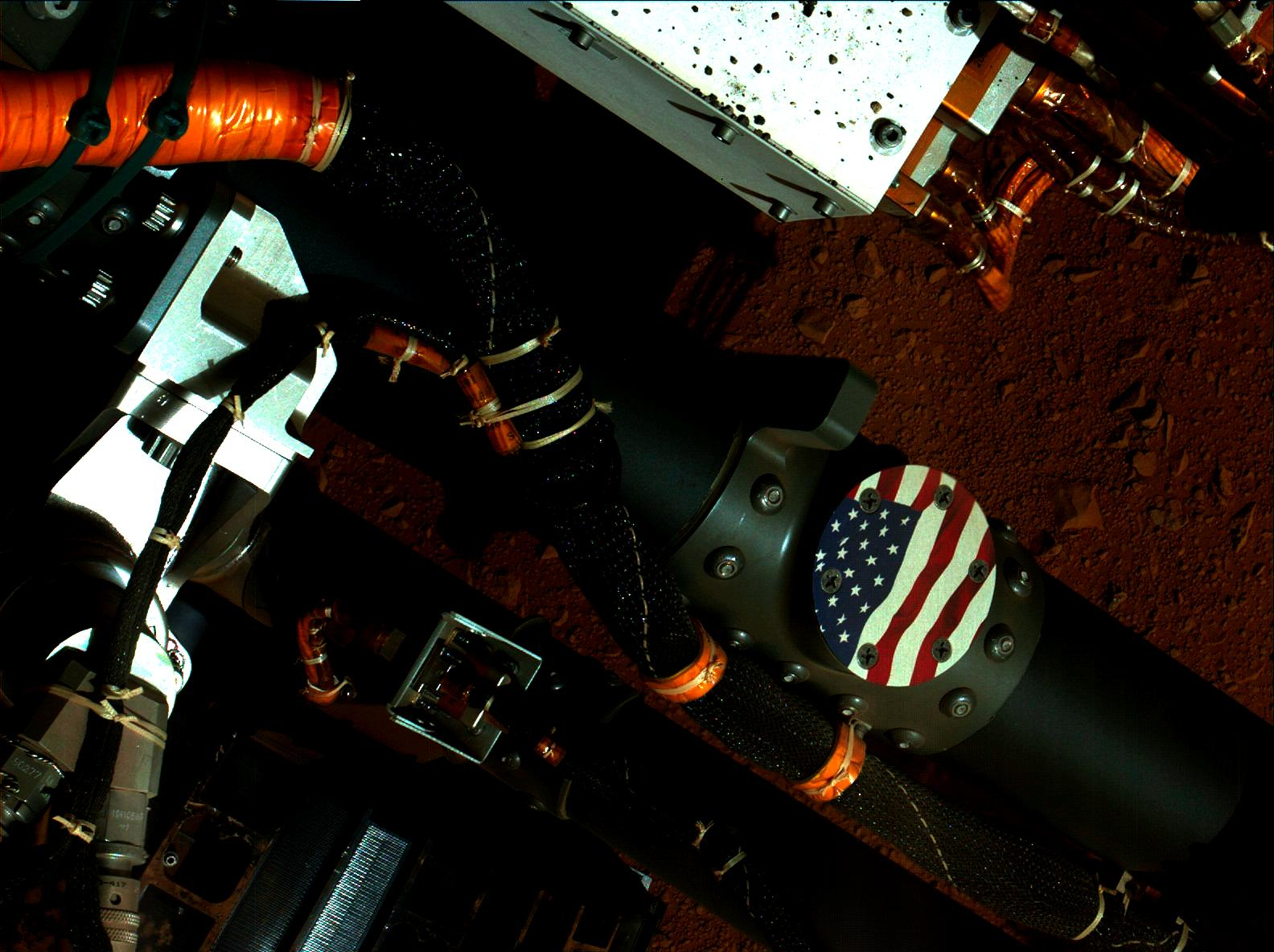
U.S. flag medallion

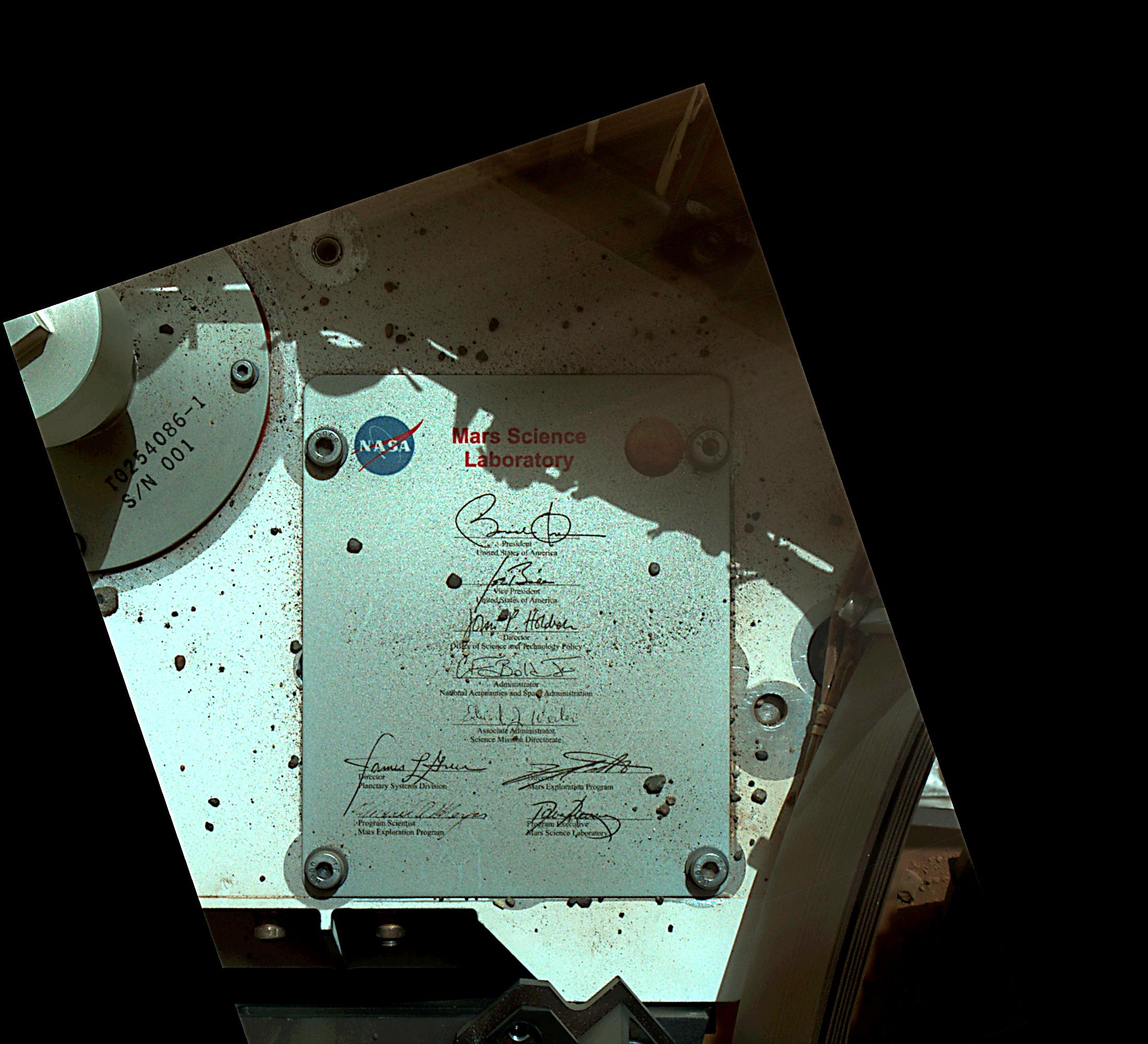
Plaque with President Obama and Vice President Biden's signatures

NASA gave the general public the opportunity from 2009 until 2011 to submit their names to be sent to Mars. More than 1.2 million people from the international community participated, and their names were etched into silicon using an electron-beam machine used for fabricating micro devices at JPL, and this plaque is now installed on the deck of Curiosity. In keeping with a 40-year tradition, a plaque with the signatures of President Barack Obama and Vice President Joe Biden was also installed. Elsewhere on the rover is the autograph of Clara Ma, the 12-year-old girl from Kansas who gave Curiosity its name in an essay contest, writing in part that "curiosity is the passion that drives us through our everyday lives".

On August 6, 2013, Curiosity audibly played "Happy Birthday to You" in honor of the one Earth year mark of its Martian landing.

On June 24, 2014, Curiosity completed a Martian year – 687 Earth days – after finding that Mars once had environmental conditions favorable for microbial life. Curiosity served as the basis for the design of the Perseverance rover for the Mars 2020 rover mission. Some spare parts from the build and ground test of Curiosity are being used in the new vehicle, but it will carry a different instrument payload.

In 2014, the project chief engineer Rob Manning wrote a book detailing the development and landing of the Curiosity rover, titled Mars Rover Curiosity: An Inside Account from Curiosity's Chief Engineer.

On August 5, 2017, NASA celebrated the fifth anniversary of the Curiosity rover mission landing, and related exploratory accomplishments, on the planet Mars. (Videos: Curiosity's First Five Years (02:07); Curiosity's POV: Five Years Driving (05:49); Curiosity's Discoveries About Gale Crater (02:54))

In popular culture, the launch of Curiosity is referenced in the music video for Harry Styles' 2023 song, "Satellite".

== Images ==
=== Components of Curiosity ===
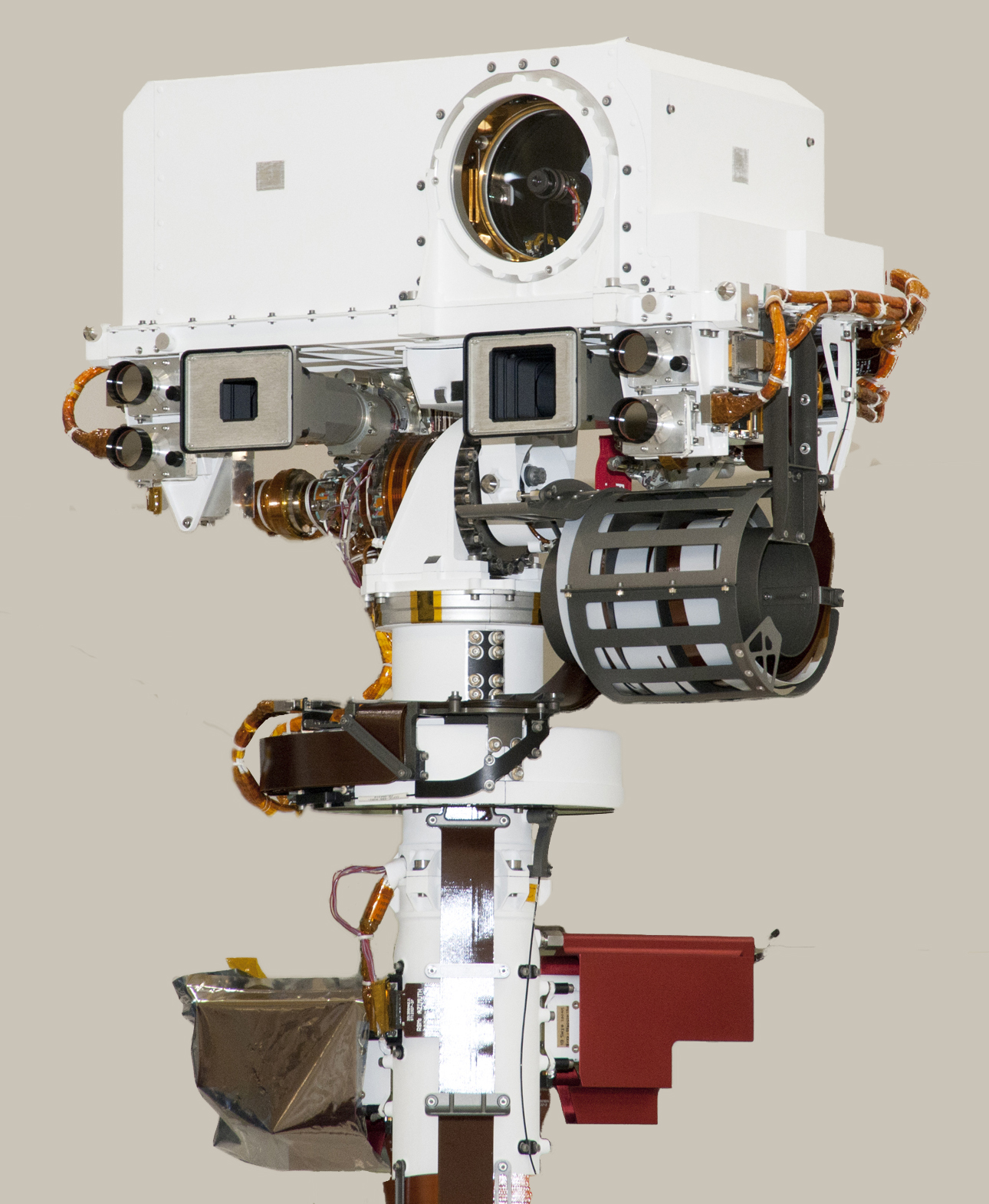
Mast head with ChemCam, MastCam-34, MastCam-100, NavCam

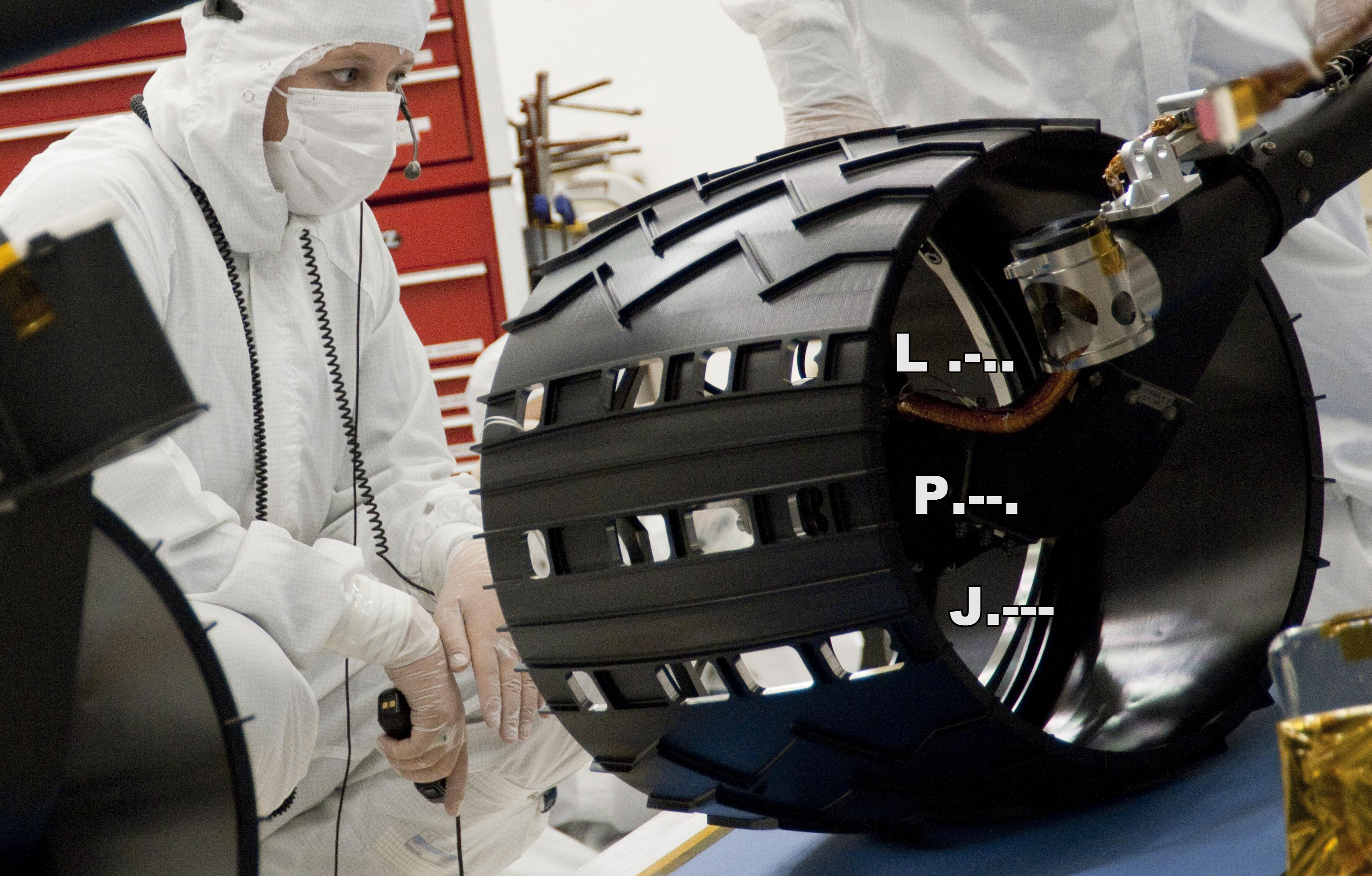
One of the six wheels on Curiosity

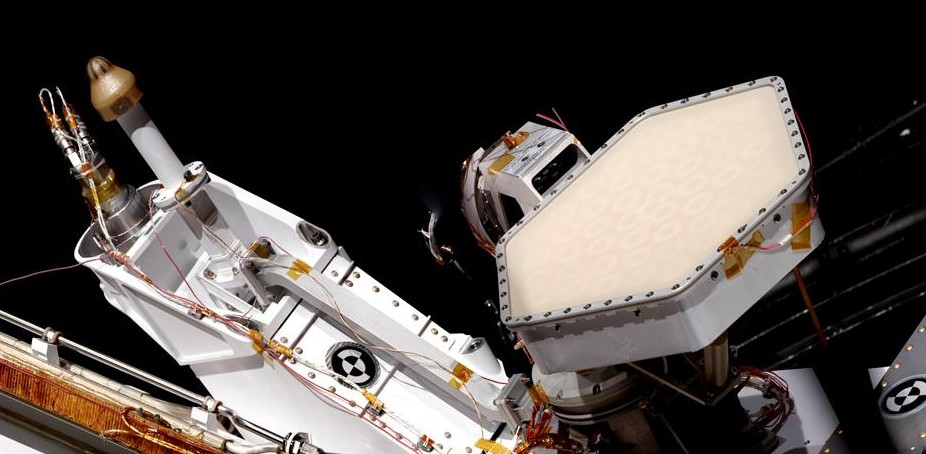
High-gain (right) and low-gain (left) antennas

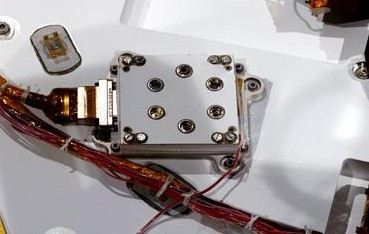
UV sensor

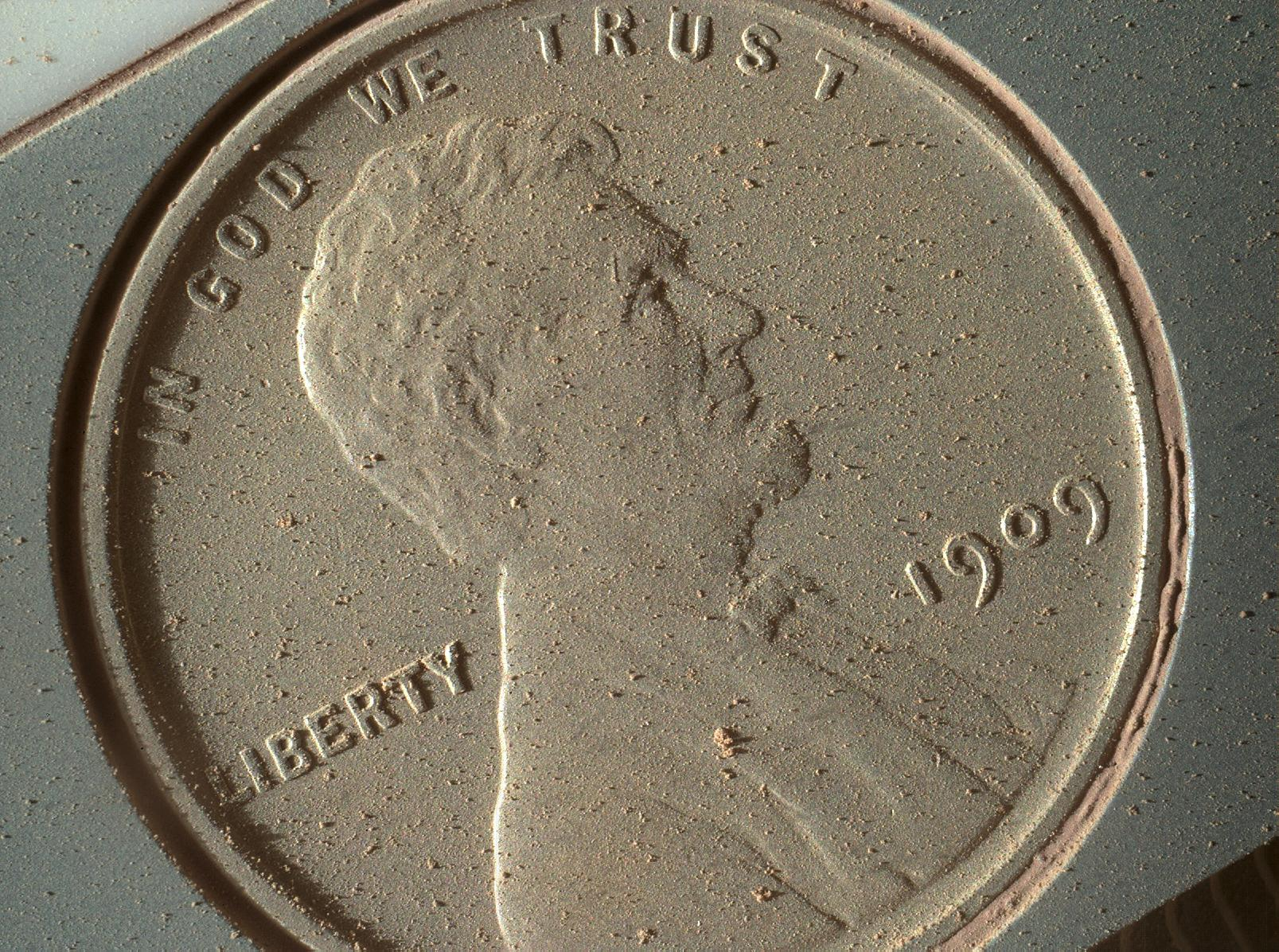
A 1909 Lincoln penny mounted on Curiosity as a calibration target

=== Example rover images ===
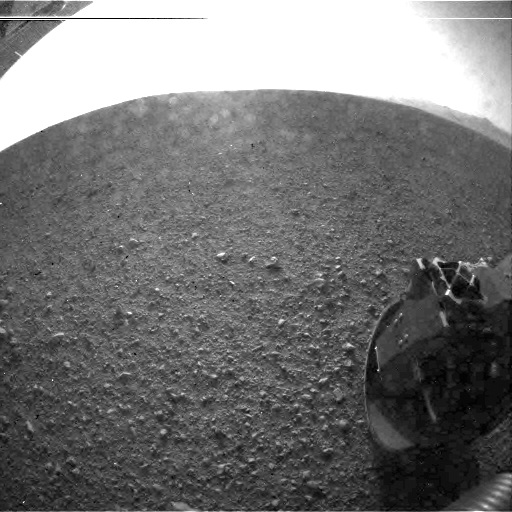
Curiosity's first image after landing (without clear dust cover, 6 August 2012)

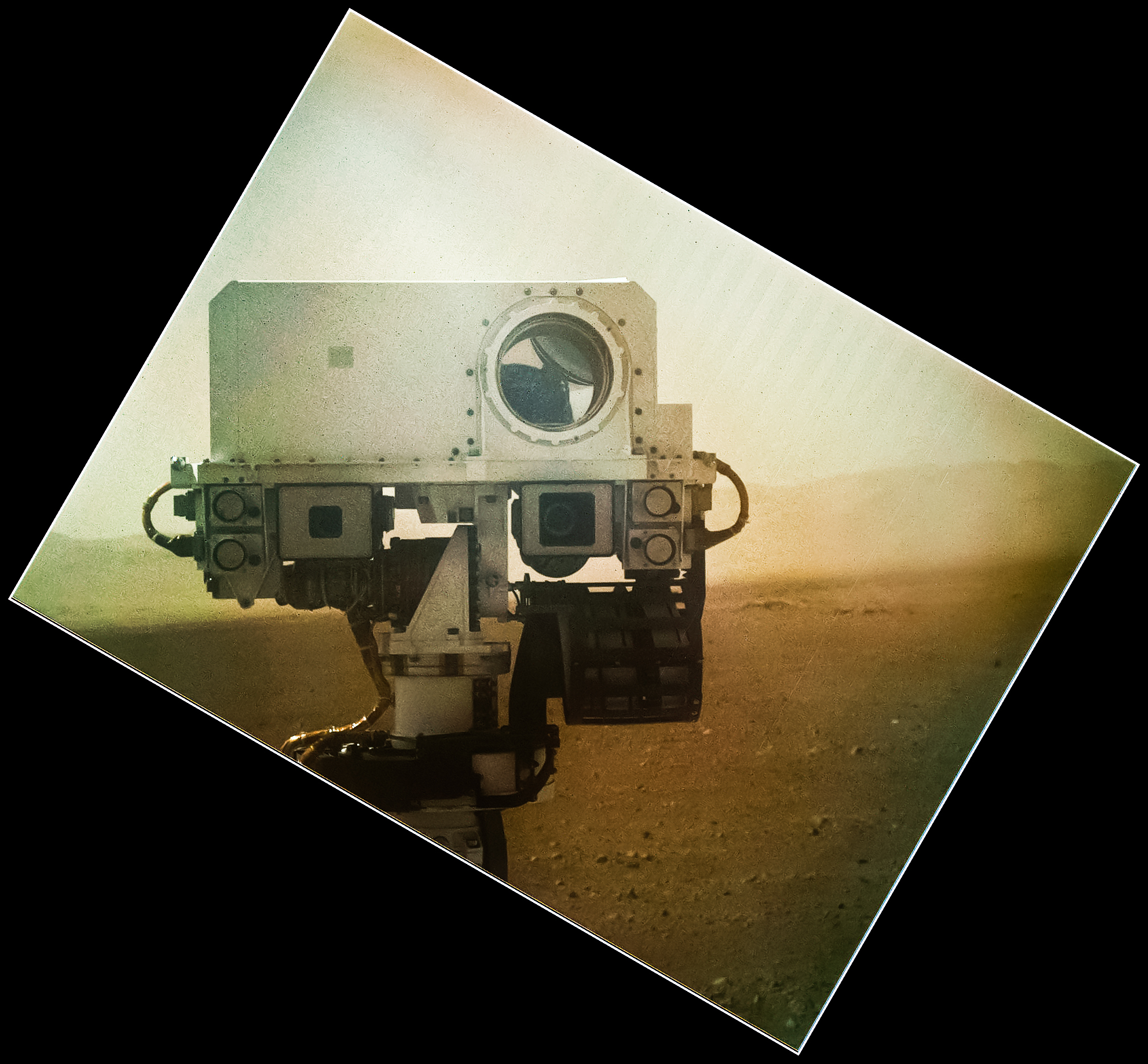
Curiosity's self-portrait (7 September 2012; rotated and color-corrected)

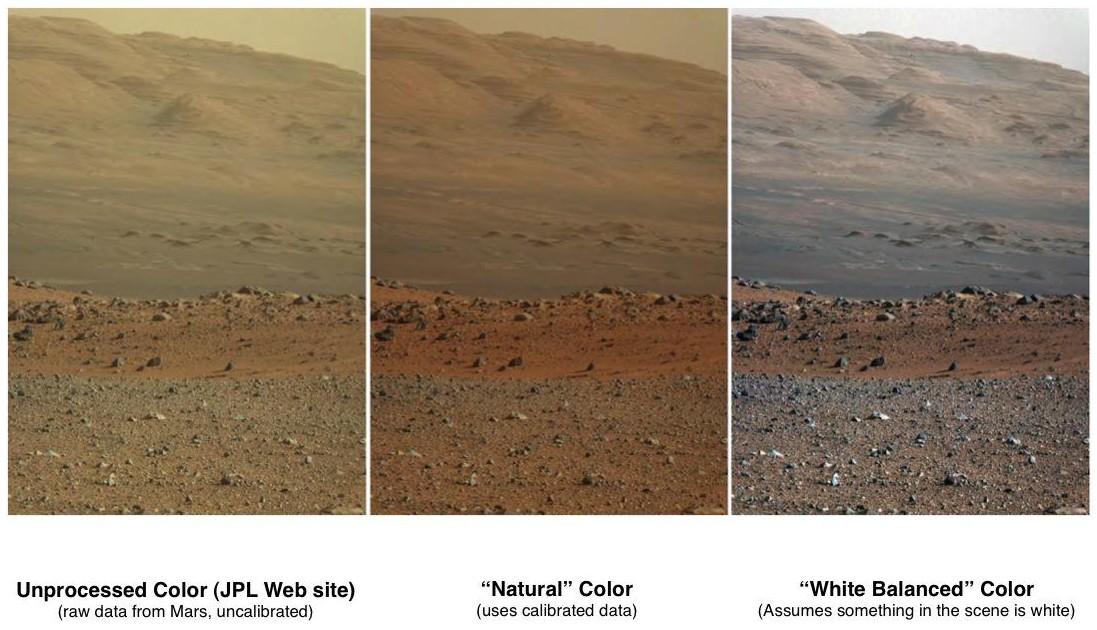
Comparison of color versions (raw, natural, white balance) of Aeolis Mons on Mars (23 August 2012)

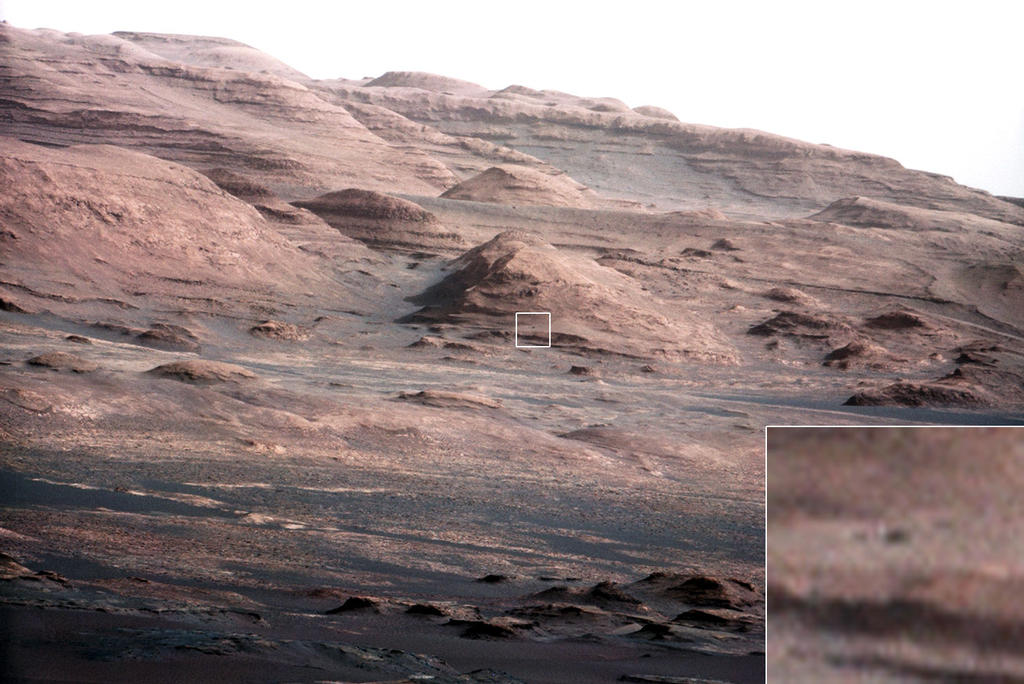
Layers at the base of Aeolis Mons. The dark rock in inset is the same size as Curiosity.
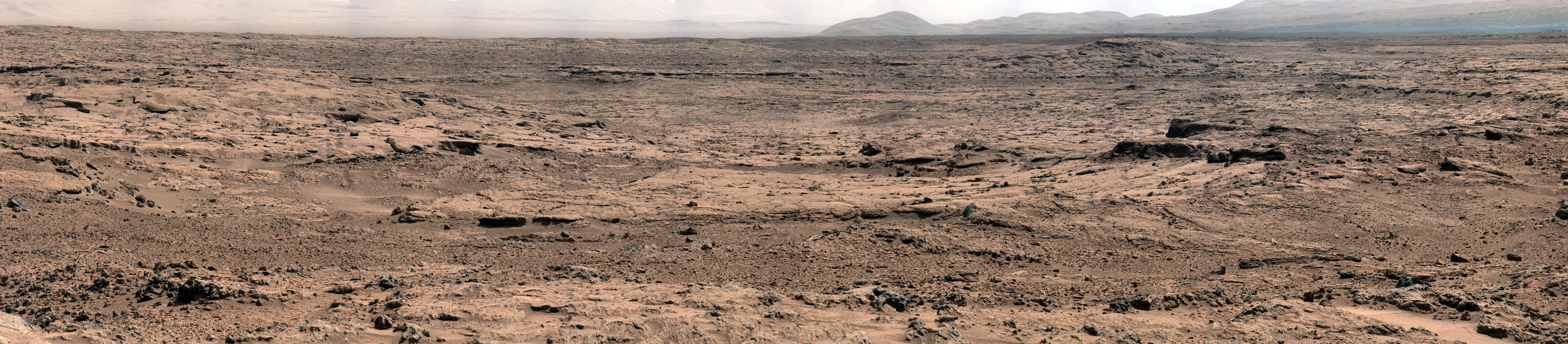
Curiosity's view from Rocknest looking east toward Point Lake (center) on the way to Glenelg (November 26, 2012; white balanced; raw color version)

== See also ==
- Experience Curiosity – Interactive web application
- InSight – NASA Mars lander (2018–2022)
- Life on Mars – Assessments of possible life on Mars
- Viking program – Pair of NASA landers and orbiters sent to Mars in 1976
- Timeline of Mars Science Laboratory – Event timeline of the NASA Mars Science Laboratory mission
- Mars Express
- 2001 Mars Odyssey
- Mars Orbiter Mission – Indian orbiter mission to Mars (2013–2022)
- Mars Reconnaissance Orbiter
- Mars 2020 – Astrobiology Mars rover mission by NASA
- Sojourner rover
- Spirit rover
- Opportunity rover
- Perseverance rover
- Rosalind Franklin rover
- Zhurong rover
- Comparison of embedded computer systems on board the Mars rovers
