= Rocker-bogie =

Suspension design common in space rovers

A rocker bogie

In motion – incorrectly shows chassis staying level; the chassis actually maintains the average of the two rockers due to the differential

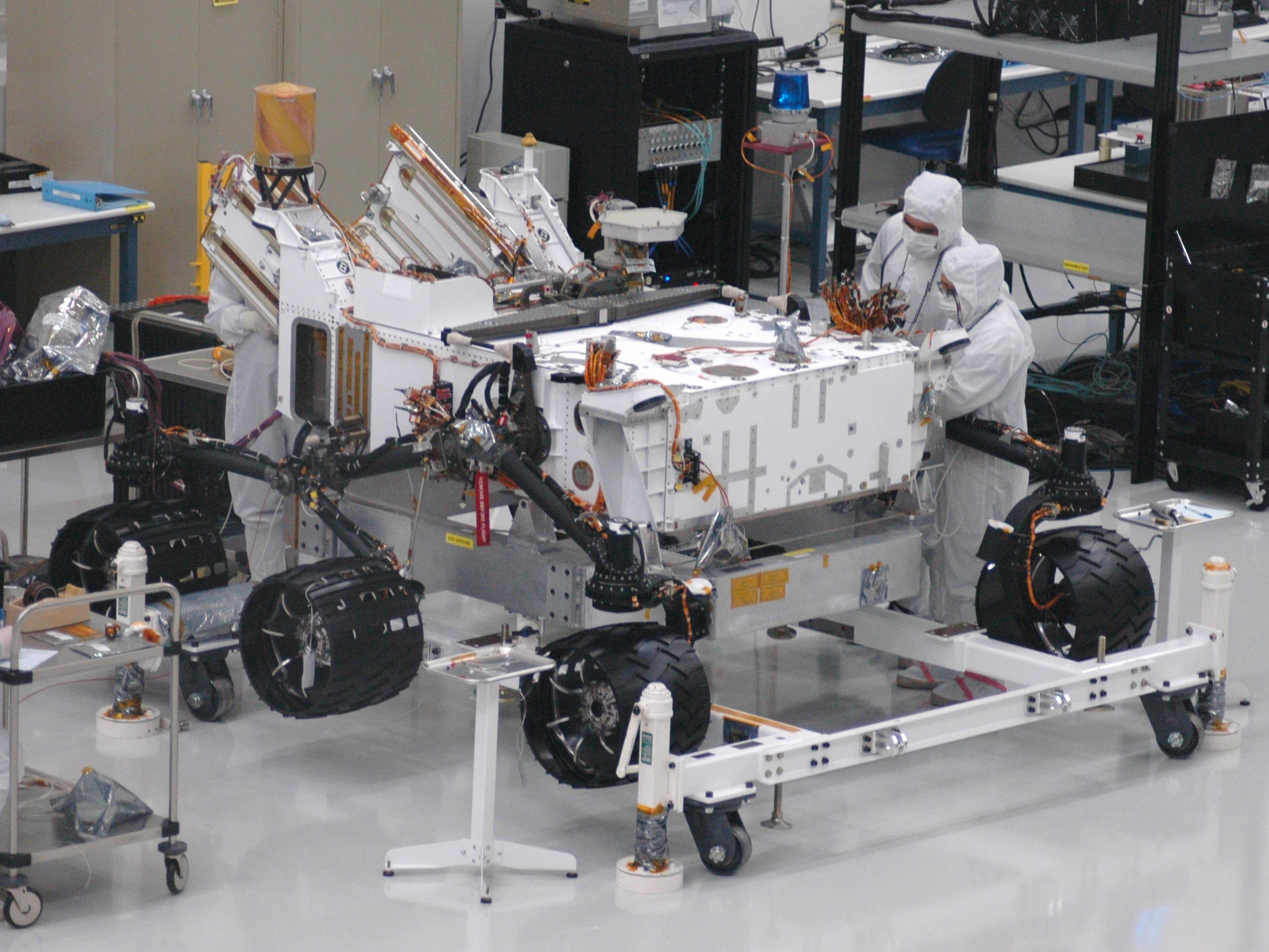
Rocker bogie on Curiosity

The rocker-bogie system is a suspension arrangement invented by NASA engineer Donald B. Bickler in 1988 for use in NASA's Mars rover Sojourner, and which has since become NASA's favored design for rovers. It has been used in the 2003 Mars Exploration Rover mission robots Spirit and Opportunity, on the 2012 Mars Science Laboratory (MSL) mission's rover Curiosity, the Mars 2020 rover Perseverance and ISRO's Chandrayaan-3 rover Pragyan in 2023.

The "rocker" part of the suspension comes from the rocking aspect of the larger, body-mounted linkage on each side of the rover. These rockers are connected to each other and the vehicle chassis through a differential. Relative to the chassis, the rockers will rotate in opposite directions to maintain approximately equal wheel contact. The chassis maintains the average pitch angle of both rockers. One end of a rocker is fitted with a drive wheel, and the other end is pivoted to the bogie.

The "bogie" part of the suspension refers to the smaller linkage that pivots to the rocker in the middle and which has a drive wheel at each end. Bogies were commonly used as load wheels in the tracks of army tanks as idlers distributing the load over the terrain, and were also quite commonly used in trailers of semi-trailer trucks. Both tanks and semi-trailers now prefer trailing arm suspensions.

On the Sojourner rover the front wheels attach to the bogies, while on the MER and MSL rovers the front wheels attach to the rockers.

== Design ==
The rocker-bogie design is an articulated, passively sprung (unsprung) suspension system that uses split rather than full-width axles. It is intended to maintain contact between all six wheels and uneven terrain while distributing wheel loads through mechanical articulation and load averaging.

The suspension geometry allows the rover to climb obstacles significantly larger than a wheel radius while limiting vehicle body motion. In rover applications such as the Mars Exploration Rover mission, the rocker-bogie system was designed with a kinematic range sufficient to traverse obstacles of approximately 20 cm height.

As with any suspension system, tilt stability is limited by the height and location of the vehicle's center of mass. Engineering requirements for the Mars Exploration Rover suspension included stability to at least 45 degrees in pitch and roll under static conditions. For the Curiosity rover, mission documentation states that the vehicle can withstand tilts of at least 45 degrees without overturning, although operational limits restrict allowable tilts to lower values.

Rocker-bogie suspensions are typically used at low speeds to reduce dynamic shock loads when traversing large obstacles. NASA engineering documentation for the Mars Exploration Rover suspension described design targets intended to limit translational impact loads to no more than 6 g during obstacle traversal.

Each of the Curiosity rover's six wheels has an independent drive motor. The front and rear wheels have independent steering motors, allowing the rover to turn in place. The wheels incorporate grousers for traction in soft soil and on rocky surfaces.

When climbing a near-vertical obstacle face, the front wheels are driven against the obstacle while the middle and rear wheels provide forward force. As the front wheel climbs, it lifts the forward part of the vehicle. The middle wheel then climbs the obstacle, followed by the rear wheel, with the suspension articulation maintaining contact and stability during the sequence.

Because forward progress can slow during obstacle traversal, rocker-bogie vehicles are generally optimized for rough terrain mobility rather than high-speed travel. Proposed future rover concepts for crewed surface operations have examined higher-speed mobility systems for use alongside astronauts and for long-range exploration missions.

== Development ==
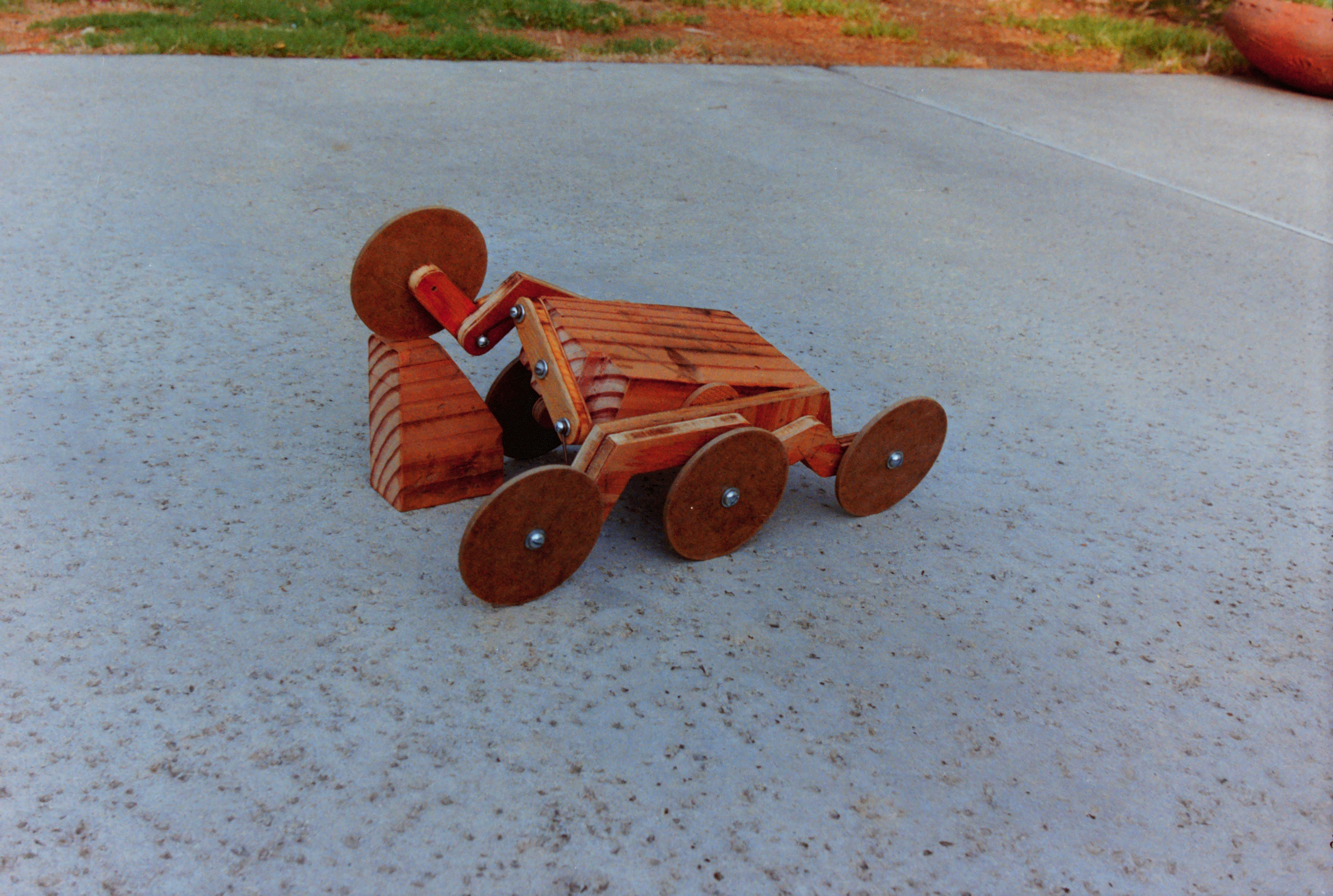
Early wooden model of Bickler's articulated suspension design.

The rocker-bogie suspension emerged from rover mobility studies carried out at NASA's Jet Propulsion Laboratory during the late 1980s. Early work on Mars rover concepts included experimental six-wheel vehicles designed to improve stability and obstacle-climbing ability on rough terrain.

According to accounts of the Mars Pathfinder program, Donald B. Bickler developed several early rover prototypes before the final suspension layout was adopted. These included an articulated wooden model used to demonstrate the behaviour of a springless six-wheel suspension, followed by a motorised prototype known as the "Bickler pantograph", which used parallel four-bar linkages to provide high ground clearance and improved obstacle traversal.

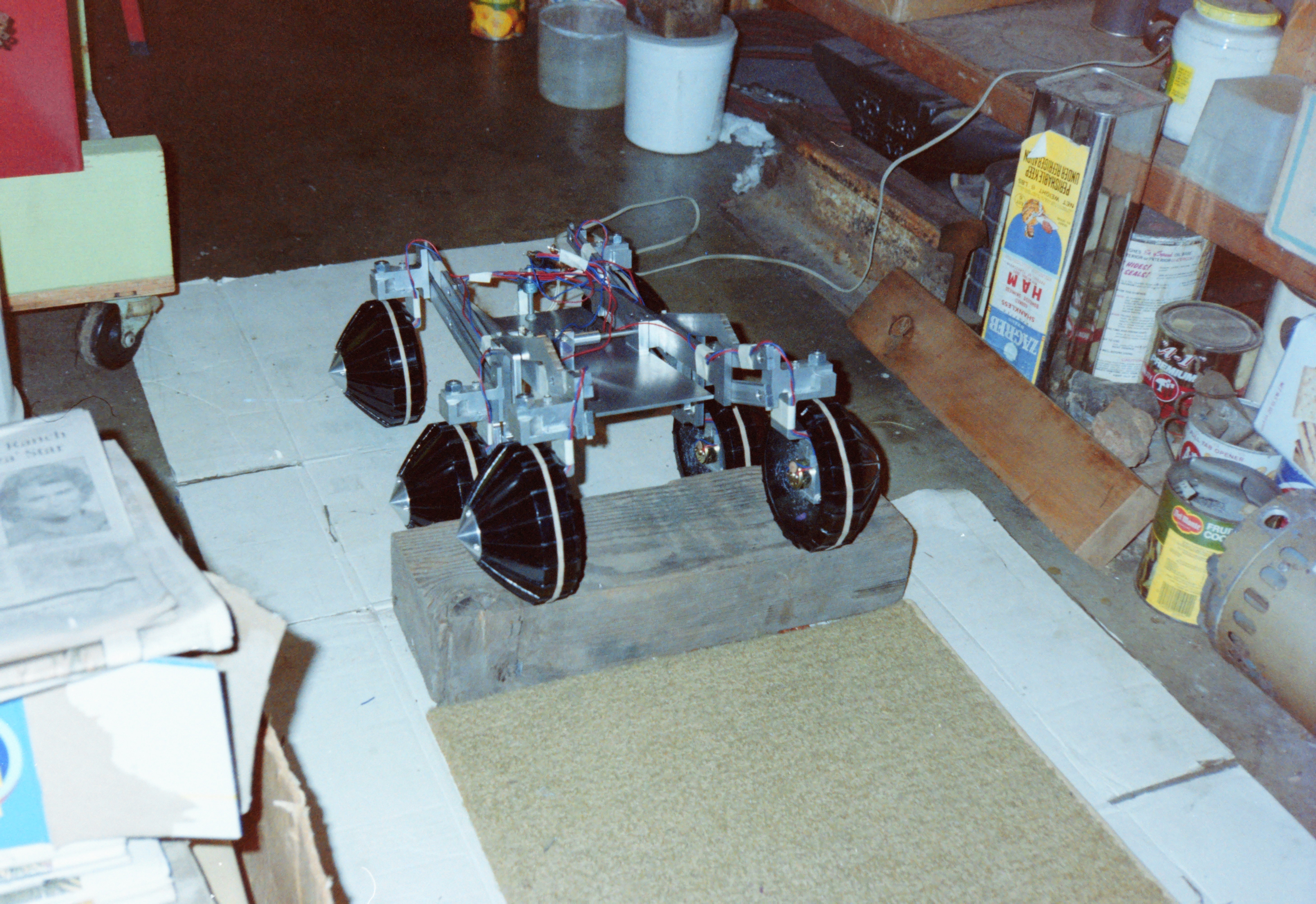
The “Bickler Pantograph”, an early rover prototype, pictured in Bickler's garage.

The pantograph design was incorporated into rover studies for the proposed Mars Rover/Sample Return mission in 1988, where it formed the basis of a six-wheel articulated rover design developed at JPL. Bickler later worked on experimental rovers in the Rocky series, which adopted a simplified rocker-bogie configuration that retained the mobility advantages of the earlier designs while improving climbing performance over previous six-wheel rover concepts.

The suspension concept was formalised in U.S. Patent 4,840,394, Articulated Suspension System, filed in 1987 and issued in 1989.

== See also ==
- iBOT
- Whippletree (mechanism)
