= Mars Exploration Rover =

NASA mission to explore Mars via two rovers

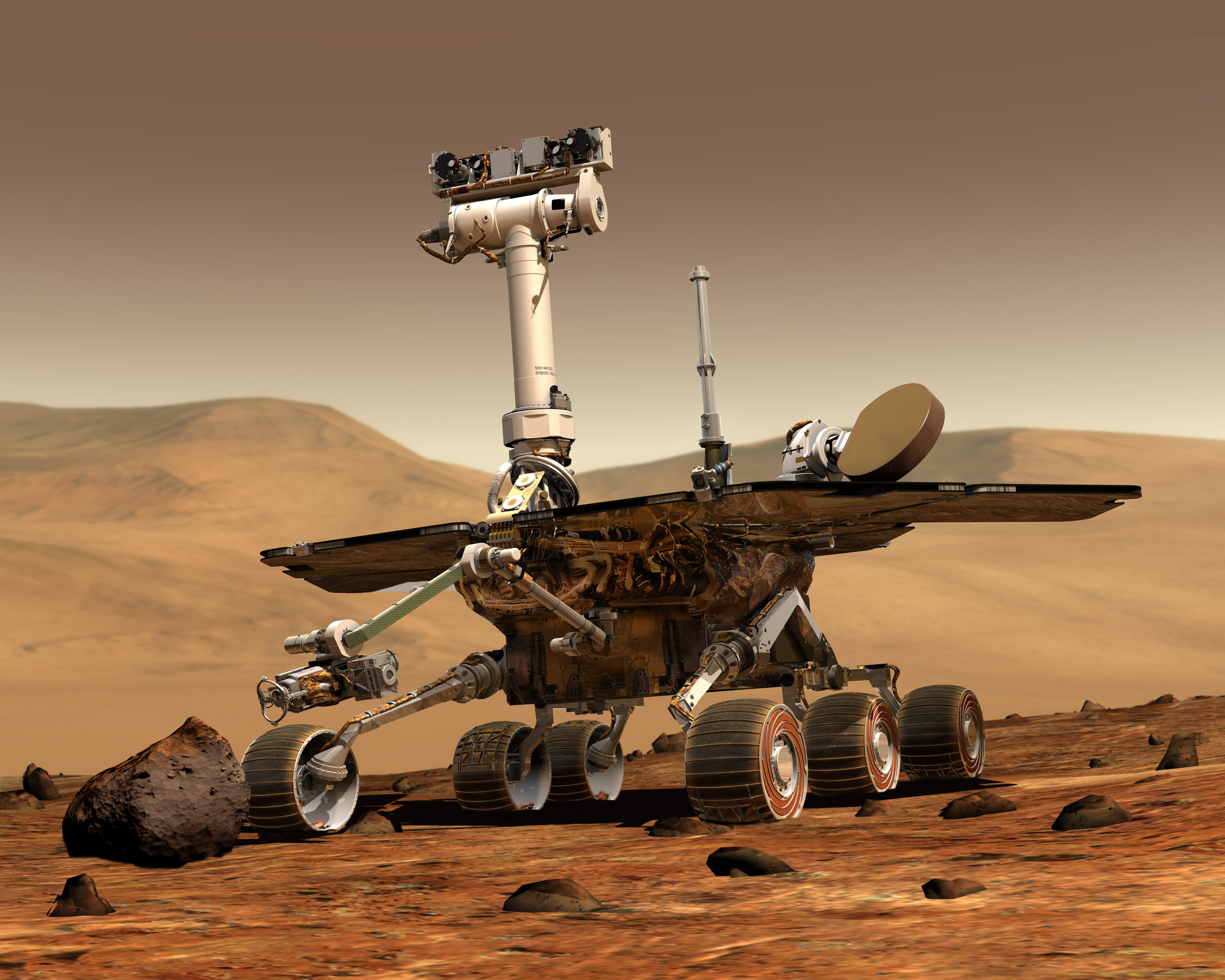
Artist's conception of MER rovers on Mars

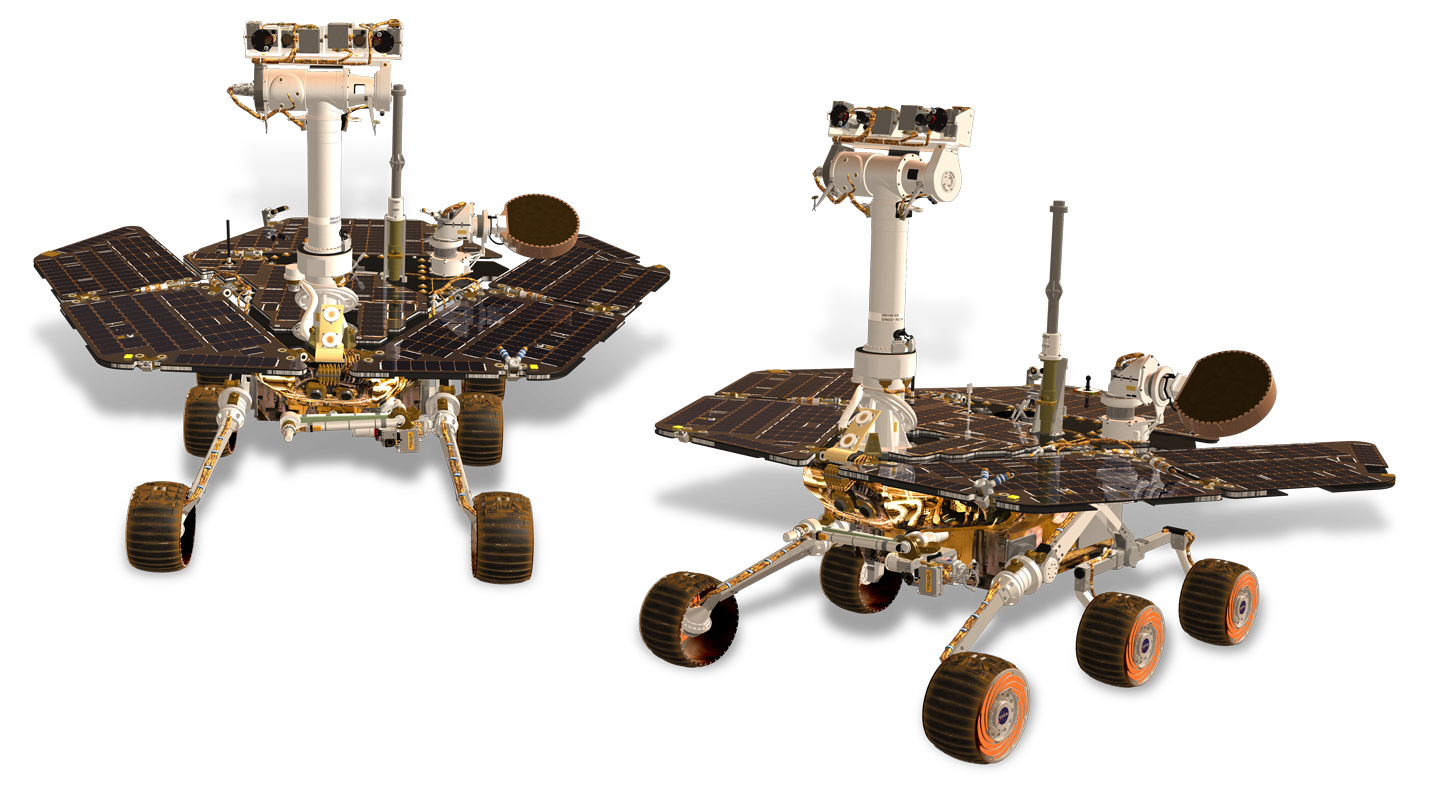
MER imaged from different angles

NASA's Mars Exploration Rover (MER) mission was a robotic space mission involving two Mars rovers, Spirit and Opportunity, exploring the planet Mars. It began in 2003 with the launch of the two rovers to explore the Martian surface and geology; both landed on Mars at separate locations in January 2004. Both rovers far outlived their planned missions of 90 Martian solar days: MER-A Spirit was active until March 22, 2010, while MER-B Opportunity was active until June 10, 2018.

== Objectives ==
The mission's scientific objective was to search for and characterize a wide range of rocks and soils that hold clues to past water activity on Mars. The mission is part of NASA's Mars Exploration Program, which includes three previous successful landers: the two Viking program landers in 1976 and Mars Pathfinder probe in 1997.

The scientific objectives of the Mars Exploration Rover mission were to:

- Search for and characterize a variety of rocks and soils that hold clues to past water activity. In particular, samples sought include those that have minerals deposited by water-related processes such as precipitation, evaporation, sedimentary cementation, or hydrothermal activity.
- Determine the distribution and composition of minerals, rocks, and soils surrounding the landing sites.
- Determine what geologic processes have shaped the local terrain and influenced the chemistry. Such processes could include water or wind erosion, sedimentation, hydrothermal mechanisms, volcanism, and cratering.
- Perform calibration and validation of surface observations made by Mars Reconnaissance Orbiter (MRO) instruments. This will help determine the accuracy and effectiveness of various instruments that survey Martian geology from orbit.
- Search for iron-containing minerals, and to identify and quantify relative amounts of specific mineral types that contain water or were formed in water, such as iron-bearing carbonates.
- Characterize the mineralogy and textures of rocks and soils to determine the processes that created them.
- Search for geological clues to the environmental conditions that existed when liquid water was present.
- Assess whether those environments were conducive to life.

The total cost of building, launching, landing and operating the rovers on the surface for the initial 90-sol primary mission was US$820 million. Each rover received five mission extensions, as they continued to function past their initially planned duration. The fifth mission extension was granted in October 2007, and ran to the end of 2009. The total cost of the first four mission extensions was $104 million, and the fifth mission extension cost at least $20 million. The mission was managed by the Jet Propulsion Laboratory (JPL), which designed, built, and operated the rovers.

In recognition of the vast amount of scientific information amassed by both rovers, two asteroids have been named in their honor: 37452 Spirit and 39382 Opportunity.

== Mission timeline ==
=== Launch and landing ===
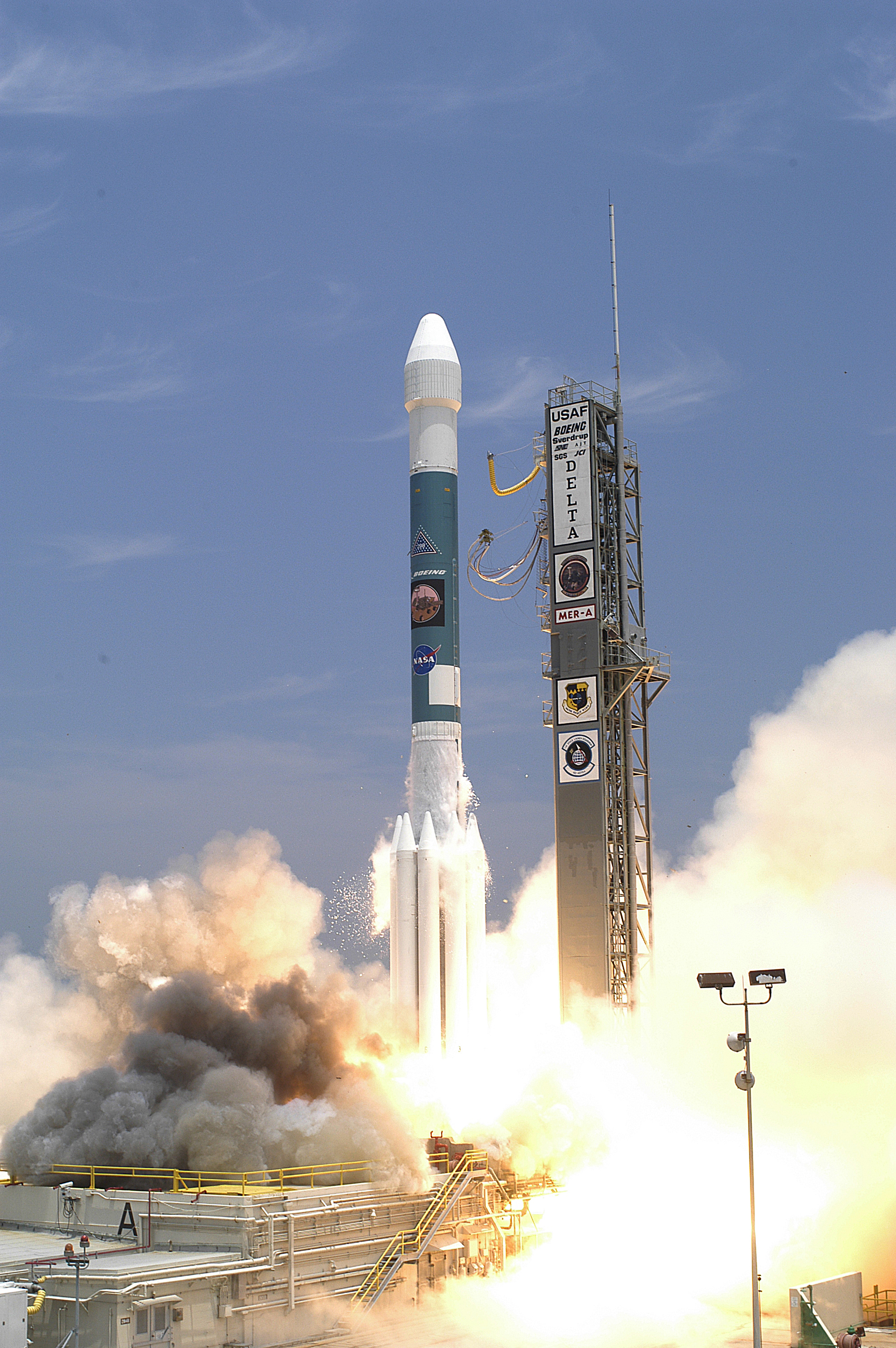
Launch of MER-A Spirit

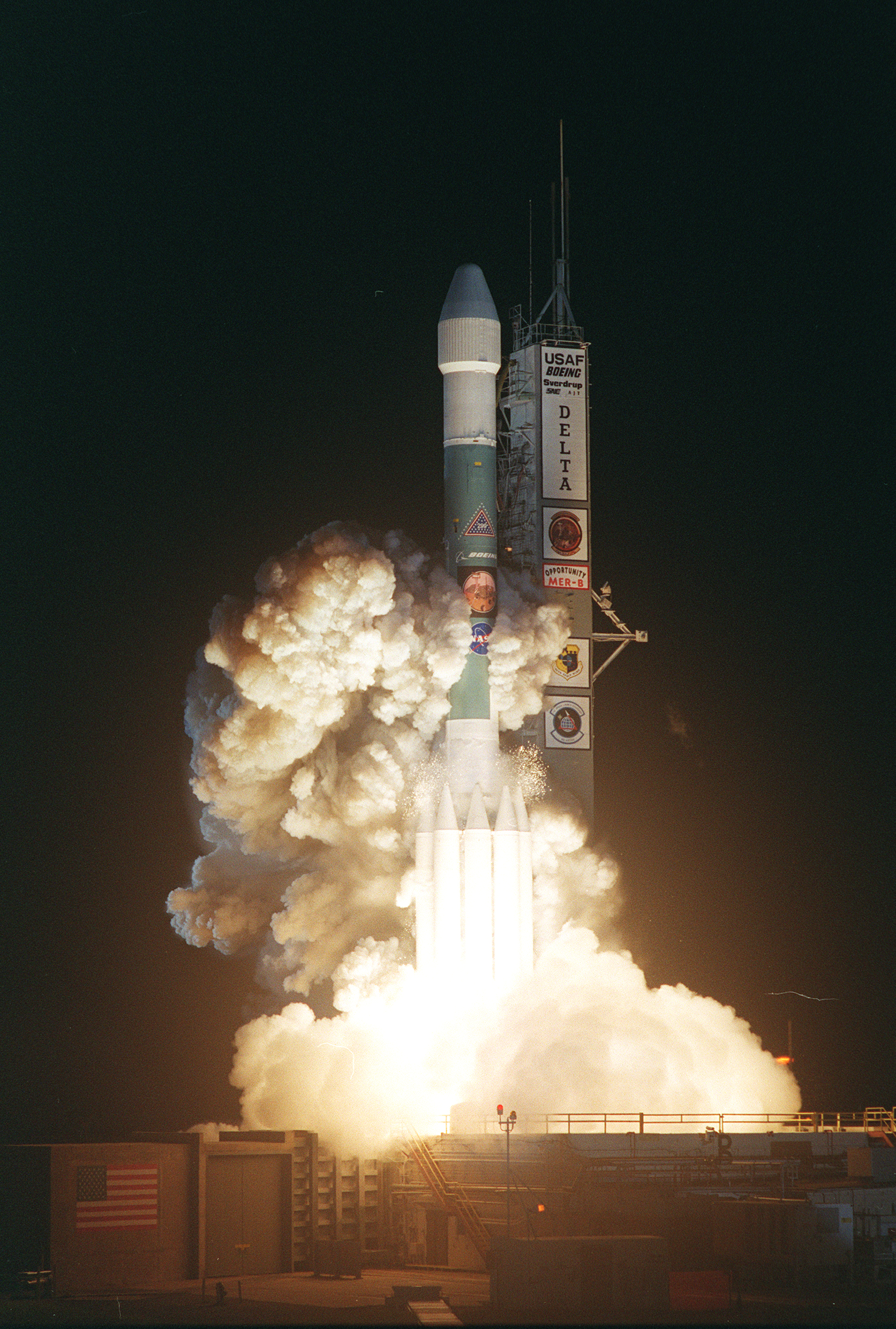
Launch of MER-B Opportunity

The MER-A (Spirit) and MER-B (Opportunity) were launched on June 10, 2003, and July 7, 2003, respectively. Though both probes launched on Boeing Delta II 7925-9.5 rockets from Cape Canaveral Space Launch Complex 17 (CCAFS SLC-17), MER-B was on the heavy version of that launch vehicle, needing the extra energy for Trans-Mars injection. The launch vehicles were integrated onto pads right next to each other, with MER-A on CCAFS SLC-17A and MER-B on CCAFS SLC-17B. The dual pads allowed for working the 15- and 21-day planetary launch periods close together; the last possible launch day for MER-A was June 19, 2003 and the first day for MER-B was June 25, 2003. NASA's Launch Services Program managed the launch of both spacecraft.

The probes landed in January 2004 in widely separated equatorial locations on Mars. On January 21, 2004, the Deep Space Network lost contact with Spirit, for reasons originally thought to be related to a flare shower over Australia. The rover transmitted a message with no data, but later that day missed another communications session with the Mars Global Surveyor. The next day, JPL received a beep from the rover, indicating that it was in fault mode. On January 23, the flight team succeeded in making the rover send. The fault was believed to have been caused by an error in the rover's flash memory subsystem. The rover did not perform any scientific activities for ten days, while engineers updated its software and ran tests. The problem was corrected by reformatting Spirit's flash memory and using a software patch to avoid memory overload; Opportunity was also upgraded with the patch as a precaution. Spirit returned to full scientific operations by February 5. Both rovers' missions were initially just 90-sol-long.

On March 23, 2004, a news conference was held announcing "major discoveries" of evidence of past liquid water on the Martian surface. A delegation of scientists showed pictures and data revealing a stratified pattern and cross bedding in the rocks of the outcrop inside a crater in Meridiani Planum, landing site of MER-B, Opportunity. This suggested that water once flowed in the region. The irregular distribution of chlorine and bromine also suggests that the place was once the shoreline of a salty sea, now evaporated.

Animations of Spirit (left) and Opportunity (right) orbits.
Sun · Earth · Mars · Rover

=== Mission extensions ===
On April 8, 2004, NASA announced that it was extending the mission life of the rovers from three to eight months. It immediately provided additional funding of US$15 million through September, and $2.8 million per month for continuing operations. Later that month, Opportunity arrived at Endurance crater, taking about five days to drive the 200 meters. NASA announced on September 22 that it was extending the mission life of the rovers for another six months. Opportunity was to leave Endurance crater, visit its discarded heat shield, and proceed to Victoria crater. Spirit was to attempt to climb to the top of the Columbia Hills.

With the two rovers still functioning well, NASA later announced another 18-month extension of the mission to September 2006. Opportunity was to visit the "Etched Terrain" and Spirit was to climb a rocky slope toward the top of Husband Hill. On August 21, 2005, Spirit reached the summit of Husband Hill after 581 sols and a journey of 4.81 kilometers (2.99 mi).

Spirit's front right wheel ceased working on March 13, 2006, while the rover was moving itself to McCool Hill. Its drivers attempted to drag the dead wheel behind Spirit, but this only worked until reaching an impassable sandy area on the lower slopes. Drivers directed Spirit to a smaller sloped feature, dubbed "Low Ridge Haven", where it spent the long Martian winter, waiting for spring and increased solar power levels suitable for driving. That September, Opportunity reached the rim of Victoria crater, and Spaceflight Now reported that NASA had extended mission for the two rovers through September 2007. On February 6, 2007, Opportunity became the first spacecraft to traverse ten kilometers (6.2 miles) on the surface of Mars.

In July 2007, during the fourth mission extension, Martian dust storms blocked sunlight to the rovers and threatened the ability of the craft to gather energy through their solar panels, causing engineers to fear that one or both of them might be permanently disabled. However, the dust storms lifted, allowing them to resume operations.

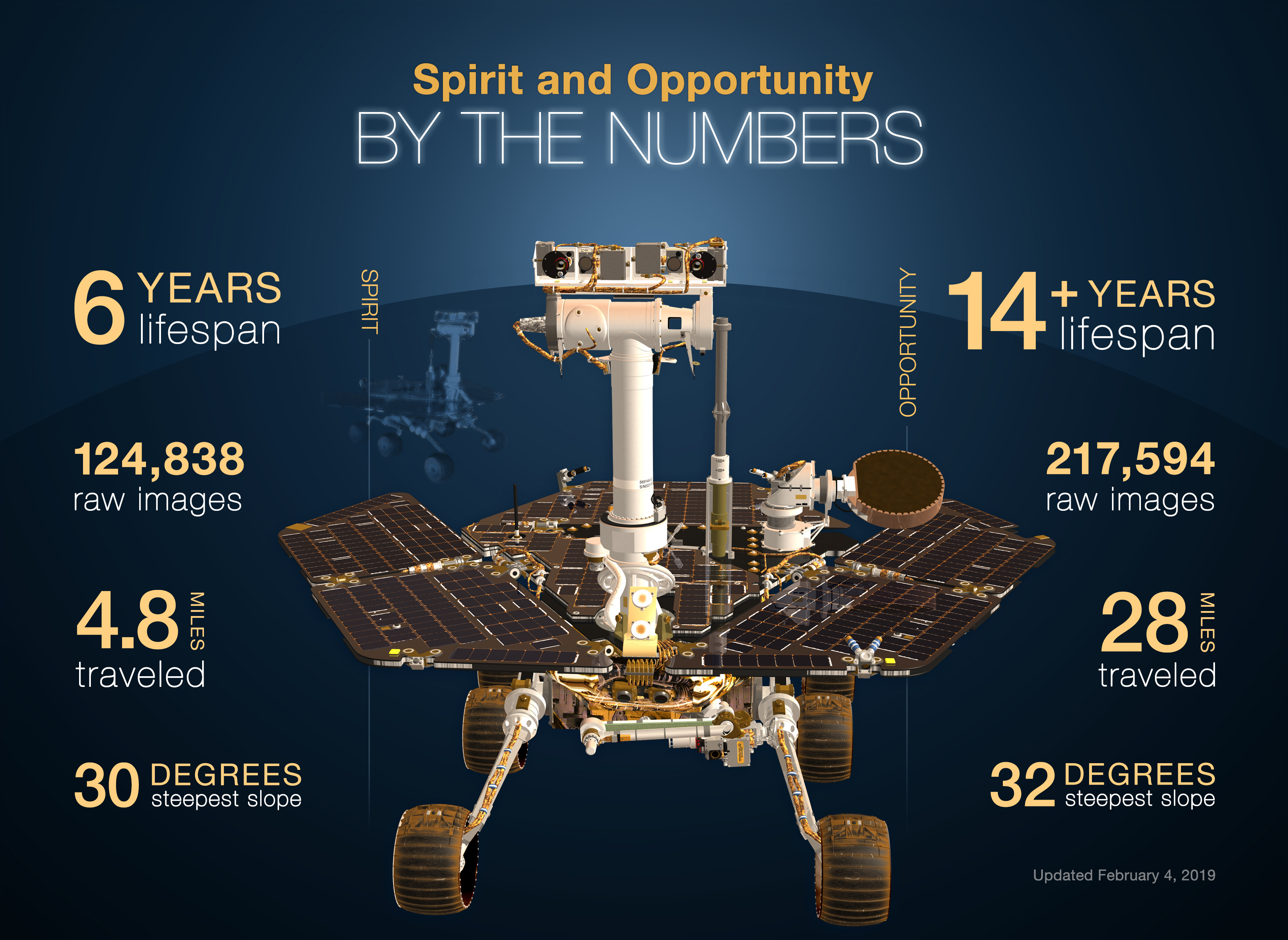
Spirit and Opportunity by the numbers

Opportunity was poised to enter Victoria Crater from its perch on the rim of Duck Bay on June 28, 2007, but due to extensive dust storms, it was delayed until the dust had cleared and power returned to safe levels. Two months later, Spirit and Opportunity resumed driving after hunkering down during raging dust storms that limited solar power to a level that nearly caused the permanent failure of both rovers.

On October 1, 2007, both Spirit and Opportunity entered their fifth mission extension that extended operations into 2009, allowing the rovers to have spent five years exploring the Martian surface, pending their continued survival.

On August 26, 2008, Opportunity began its three-day climb out of Victoria crater amidst concerns that power spikes, similar to those seen on Spirit before the failure of its right-front wheel, might prevent it from ever being able to leave the crater if a wheel failed. Project scientist Bruce Banerdt also said, "We've done everything we entered Victoria Crater to do and more." Opportunity would return to the plains in order to characterize Meridiani Planum's vast diversity of rocks—some of which may have been blasted out of craters such as Victoria. The rover had been exploring Victoria Crater since September 11, 2007. As of January 2009, the two rovers had collectively sent back 250,000 images and traveled over 21 kilometers (13 mi).

After driving about 3.2 kilometers (2.0 mi) since it left Victoria crater, Opportunity first saw the rim of Endeavour crater on March 7, 2009. It passed the 16 km (9.9 mi) mark along the way on sol 1897. Meanwhile, at Gusev crater, Spirit was dug in deep into the Martian sand, much as Opportunity was at Purgatory Dune in 2005.

On January 26, 2010, after six years on Mars, NASA announced that Spirit would be used as a stationary research platform, after several months of unsuccessful attempts to free the rover from soft sand.

NASA announced on March 24, 2010, that Opportunity, which had an estimated remaining drive distance of 12 km (7.5 mi) to Endeavour Crater, had traveled over 20 km (12.4 mi) since the start of its mission. Each rover was designed with a mission driving distance goal of just 600 meters.

In March 2010 it was announced that Spirit may have gone into hibernation for the Martian winter and might not wake up again for months. On May 22, 2011, NASA ceased attempts to contact with Spirit, which had been stuck in a sand trap for two years. The last successful communication with the rover was on March 22, 2010. The final transmission to Spirit was on May 25, 2011.

On May 16, 2013, NASA announced that Opportunity had driven further than any other NASA vehicle on a world other than Earth. After Opportunity's total odometry went over 35.744 km (22.210 mi), the rover surpassed the total distance driven by the Apollo 17 Lunar Roving Vehicle. And on July 28, 2014, Opportunity had driven further than any other vehicle on a world other than Earth. Opportunity covered over 40 km (25 mi), surpassing the total distance of 39 km (24 mi) driven by the Lunokhod 2 lunar rover, the previous record-holder. On March 23, 2015, Opportunity had driven the full 42.2 km (26.2 mi) distance of a marathon, with a finish time of roughly 11 years and 2 months.

On January 24, 2014, NASA reported that then-current studies by the remaining rover, Opportunity, as well as by the newer Mars Science Laboratory rover Curiosity would now be searching for evidence of ancient life, including a biosphere based on autotrophic, chemotrophic and/or chemolithoautotrophic microorganisms, as well as ancient water, including fluvio-lacustrine environments (plains related to ancient rivers or lakes) that may have been habitable. The search for evidence of habitability, taphonomy (related to fossils), and organic carbon on the planet Mars was then switched to a primary NASA objective.

In June 2018, Opportunity was caught in a global-scale dust storm and the rover's solar panels were not able to generate enough power, with the last contact on June 10, 2018. NASA resumed sending commands after the dust storm subsided but the rover remained silent, possibly due to a catastrophic failure or a layer of dust covering its solar panels. A press conference was held on February 13, 2019, announcing that after numerous attempts to contact Opportunity, with no response since June 2018, NASA declared the Opportunity mission over, which also drew the 16-year long Mars Exploration Rover mission to a close.

== Spacecraft design ==
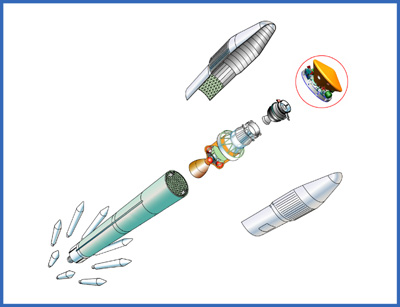
MER launch configuration, break apart illustration

The Mars Exploration Rover was designed to be stowed atop a Delta II rocket. Each spacecraft consists of several components:

- Rover: 185 kg (408 lb)
- Lander: 348 kg (767 lb)
- Backshell / Parachute: 209 kg (461 lb)
- Heat Shield: 78 kg (172 lb)
- Cruise Stage: 193 kg (425 lb)
- Propellant: 50 kg (110 lb)
- Instruments: 5 kg (11 lb)

Total mass is 1,063 kg (2,344 lb).

=== Cruise stage ===
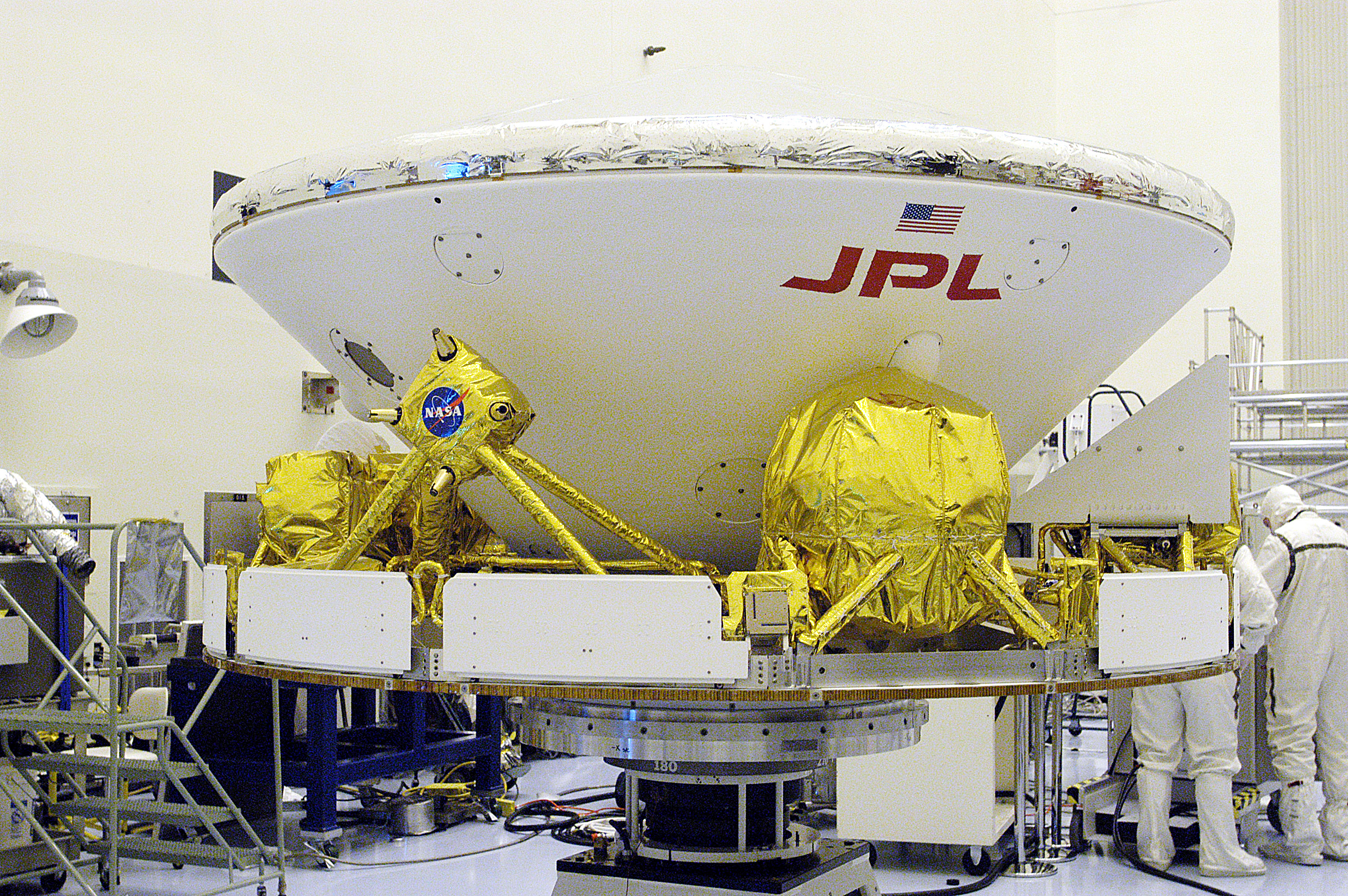
Cruise stage of Opportunity rover

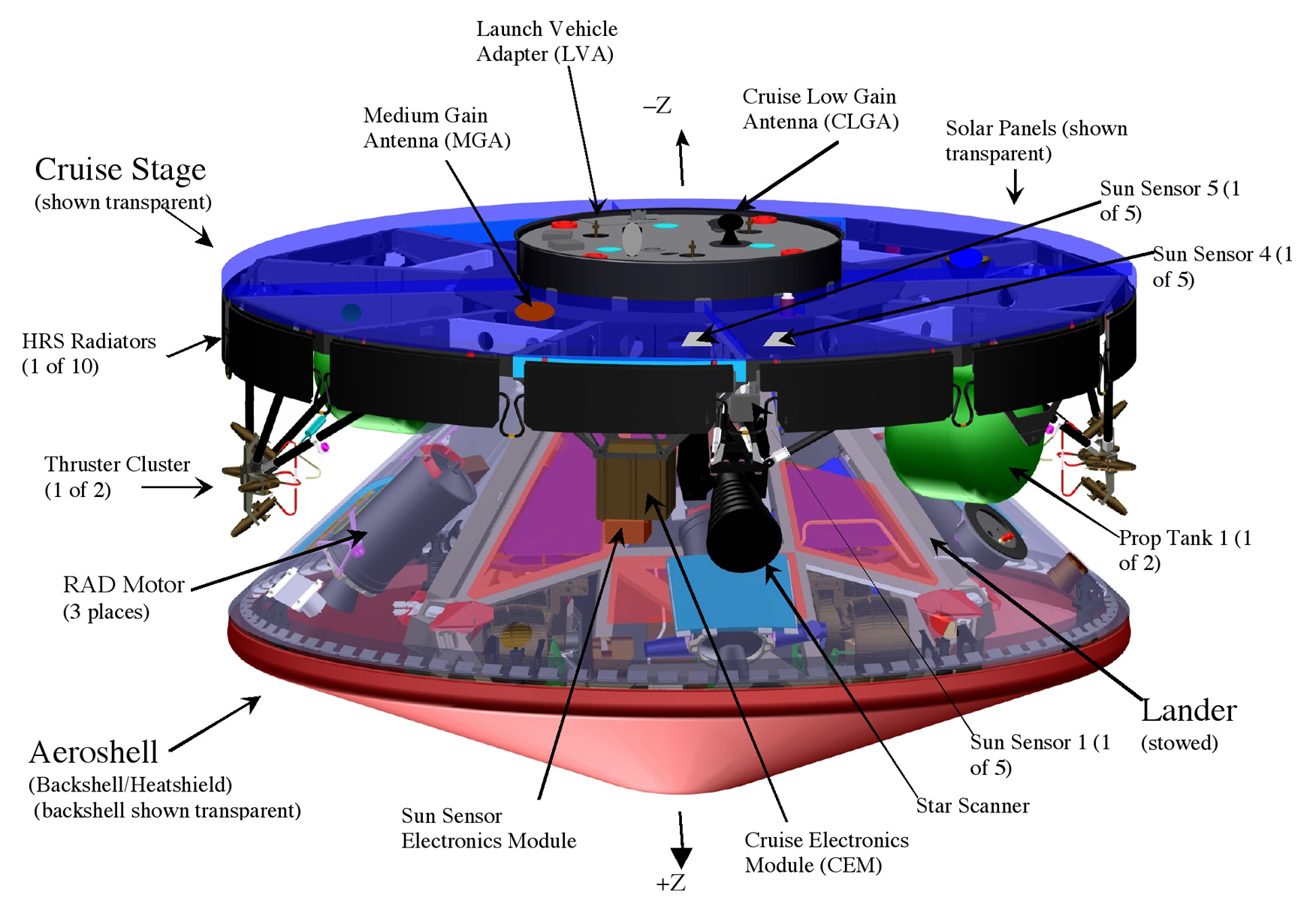
MER cruise stage diagram

The cruise stage is the component of the spacecraft that is used for travel from Earth to Mars. It is very similar to the Mars Pathfinder in design and is approximately 2.65 meters (8.7 feet) in diameter and 1.6 m (5.2 ft) tall, including the entry vehicle (see below).

The primary structure is aluminium with an outer ring of ribs covered by the solar panels, which are about 2.65 m (8.7 ft) in diameter. Divided into five sections, the solar arrays can provide up to 600 watts of power near Earth and 300 W at Mars.

Heaters and multi-layer insulation keep the electronics "warm". A freon system removes heat from the flight computer and communications hardware inside the rover so they do not overheat. Cruise avionics systems allow the flight computer to interface with other electronics, such as the Sun sensors, star scanner and heaters.

==== Navigation ====
The star scanner (without a backup system) and Sun sensor allowed the spacecraft to know its orientation in space by analyzing the position of the Sun and other stars in relation to itself. Sometimes the craft could be slightly off course; this was expected, given the 500-million-kilometer (320 million mile) journey. Thus navigators planned up to six trajectory correction maneuvers, along with health checks.

To ensure the spacecraft arrived at Mars in the right place for its landing, two light-weight, aluminium-lined tanks carried about 31 kg (about 68 lb) of hydrazine propellant. Along with cruise guidance and control systems, the propellant allowed navigators to keep the spacecraft on course. Burns and pulse firings of the propellant allowed three types of maneuvers:

- An axial burn uses pairs of thrusters to change spacecraft velocity;
- A lateral burn uses two "thruster clusters" (four thrusters per cluster) to move the spacecraft "sideways" through seconds-long pulses;
- Pulse mode firing uses coupled thruster pairs for spacecraft precession maneuvers (turns).

==== Communication ====
The spacecraft used a high-frequency X band radio wavelength to communicate, which allowed for less power and smaller antennas than many older craft, which used S band.

Navigators sent commands through two antennas on the cruise stage: a cruise low-gain antenna mounted inside the inner ring, and a cruise medium-gain antenna in the outer ring. The low-gain antenna was used close to Earth. It is omni-directional, so the transmission power that reached Earth fell faster with increasing distance. As the craft moved closer to Mars, the Sun and Earth moved closer in the sky as viewed from the craft, so less energy reached Earth. The spacecraft then switched to the medium-gain antenna, which directed the same amount of transmission power into a tighter beam toward Earth.

During flight, the spacecraft was spin-stabilized with a spin rate of two revolutions per minute (rpm). Periodic updates kept antennas pointed toward Earth and solar panels toward the Sun.

=== Aeroshell ===
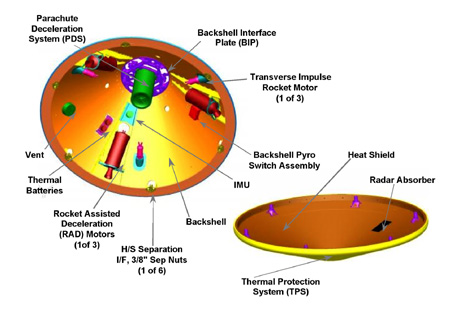
Overview of the Mars Exploration Rover aeroshell

The aeroshell maintained a protective covering for the lander during the seven-month voyage to Mars. Together with the lander and the rover, it constituted the "entry vehicle". Its main purpose was to protect the lander and the rover inside it from the intense heat of entry into the thin Martian atmosphere. It was based on the Mars Pathfinder and Mars Viking designs.

Parts

The aeroshell was made of two main parts: a heat shield and a backshell. The heat shield was flat and brownish, and protected the lander and rover during entry into the Martian atmosphere and acted as the first aerobrake for the spacecraft. The backshell was large, cone-shaped and painted white. It carried the parachute and several components used in later stages of entry, descent, and landing, including:

- A parachute (stowed at the bottom of the backshell);
- The backshell electronics and batteries that fire off pyrotechnic devices like separation nuts, rockets and the parachute mortar;
- A Litton LN-200 Inertial Measurement Unit (IMU), which monitors and reports the orientation of the backshell as it swings under the parachute;
- Three large solid rocket motors called RAD rockets (Rocket Assisted Descent), each providing about a ton of force (10 kilonewtons) for nearly 4 seconds;
- Three small solid rockets called TIRS (mounted so that they aim horizontally out the sides of the backshell) that provide a small horizontal kick to the backshell to help orient the backshell more vertically during the main RAD rocket burn.

Composition

Built by Lockheed Martin Space in Denver, Colorado, the aeroshell is made of an aluminium honeycomb structure sandwiched between graphite-epoxy face sheets. The outside of the aeroshell is covered with a layer of phenolic honeycomb. This honeycomb is filled with an ablative material (also called an "ablator"), that dissipates heat generated by atmospheric friction.

The ablator itself is a blend of cork wood, binder and many tiny silica glass spheres. It was invented for the heat shields flown on the Viking Mars lander missions. A similar technology was used in the first US crewed space missions Mercury, Gemini and Apollo. It was specially formulated to react chemically with the Martian atmosphere during entry and carry heat away, leaving a hot wake of gas behind the vehicle. The vehicle slowed from 19,000 to 1,600 km/h (5,300 to 440 m/s) in about a minute, producing about 60 m/s^{2} (6 g) of acceleration on the lander and rover.

The backshell and heat shield are made of the same materials, but the heat shield has a thicker, 13 mm (1/2 in), layer of the ablator. Instead of being painted, the backshell was covered with a very thin aluminized PET film blanket to protect it from the cold of deep space. The blanket vaporized during entry into the Martian atmosphere.

=== Parachute ===
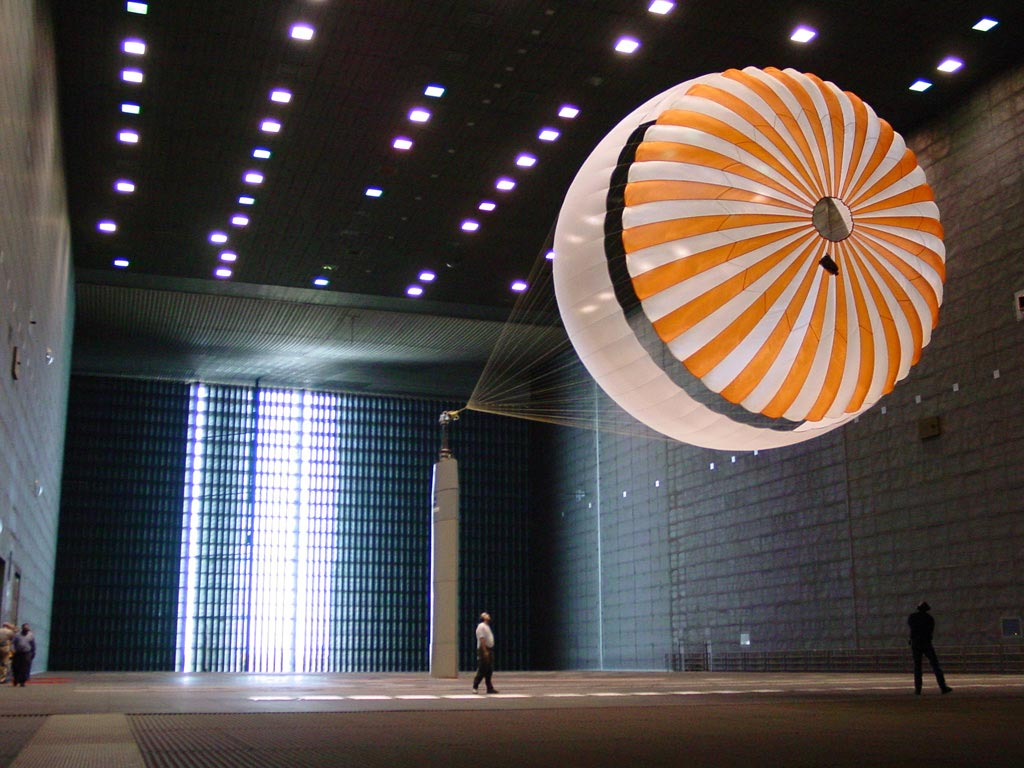
Mars Exploration Rover's parachute test

The parachute helped slow the spacecraft during entry, descent, and landing. It is located in the backshell.

Design

The 2003 parachute design was part of a long-term Mars parachute technology development effort and is based on the designs and experience of the Viking and Pathfinder missions. The parachute for this mission is 40% larger than Pathfinder's because the largest load for the Mars Exploration Rover is 80 to 85 kilonewtons (kN) or 80 to 85 kN (18,000 to 19,000 lbf) when the parachute fully inflates. By comparison, Pathfinder's inflation loads were approximately 35 kN (about 8,000 lbf). The parachute was designed and constructed in South Windsor, Connecticut by Pioneer Aerospace, who also designed the parachute for the Stardust mission.

Composition

The parachute is made of two durable, lightweight fabrics: polyester and nylon. A triple bridle made of Kevlar connects the parachute to the backshell.

The amount of space available on the spacecraft for the parachute was so small that the parachute had to be pressure-packed. Before launch, a team tightly folded the 48 suspension lines, three bridle lines, and the parachute. The parachute was loaded in a special structure that then applied a heavy weight to the parachute package several times. Before placing the parachute into the backshell, the parachute was heat set to sterilize it.

Connected systems

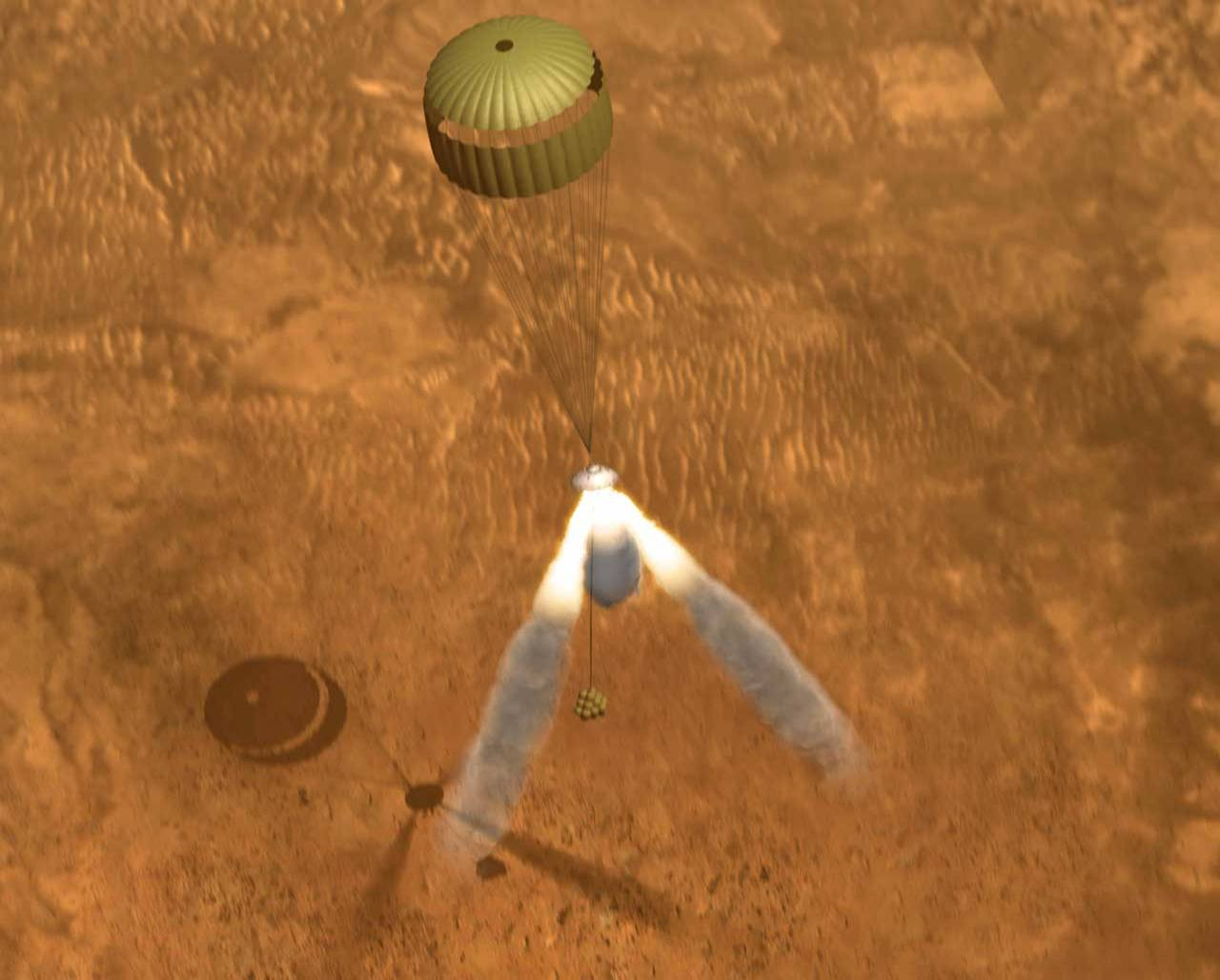
Descent is halted by retrorockets and lander is dropped 10 m (33 ft) to the surface in this computer generated impression.

After the parachute was deployed at an altitude of about 10 km (6.2 mi) above the surface, the heatshield was released using 6 separation nuts and push-off springs. The lander then separated from the backshell and "rappelled" down a metal tape on a centrifugal braking system built into one of the lander petals. The slow descent down the metal tape placed the lander in position at the end of another bridle (tether), made of a nearly 20 m (66 ft) long braided Zylon. Zylon is a fiber material, similar to Kevlar, that is sewn in a webbing pattern (like shoelace material) to make it stronger. The Zylon bridle provides space for airbag deployment, distance from the solid rocket motor exhaust stream, and increased stability. The bridle incorporates an electrical harness that allows the firing of the solid rockets from the backshell as well as provides data from the backshell inertial measurement unit (which measures rate and tilt of the spacecraft) to the flight computer in the rover.

Because the atmospheric density of Mars is less than 1% of Earth's, the parachute alone could not slow down the Mars Exploration Rover enough to ensure a safe, low landing speed. The spacecraft descent was assisted by rockets that brought the spacecraft to a dead stop 10–15 m (33–49 ft) above the Martian surface.

A radar altimeter unit was used to determine the distance to the Martian surface. The radar's antenna was mounted at one of the lower corners of the lander tetrahedron. When the radar measurement showed the lander was the correct distance above the surface, the Zylon bridle was cut, releasing the lander from the parachute and backshell so that it was free and clear for landing. The radar data also enabled the timing sequence on airbag inflation and backshell RAD rocket firing.

=== Airbags ===
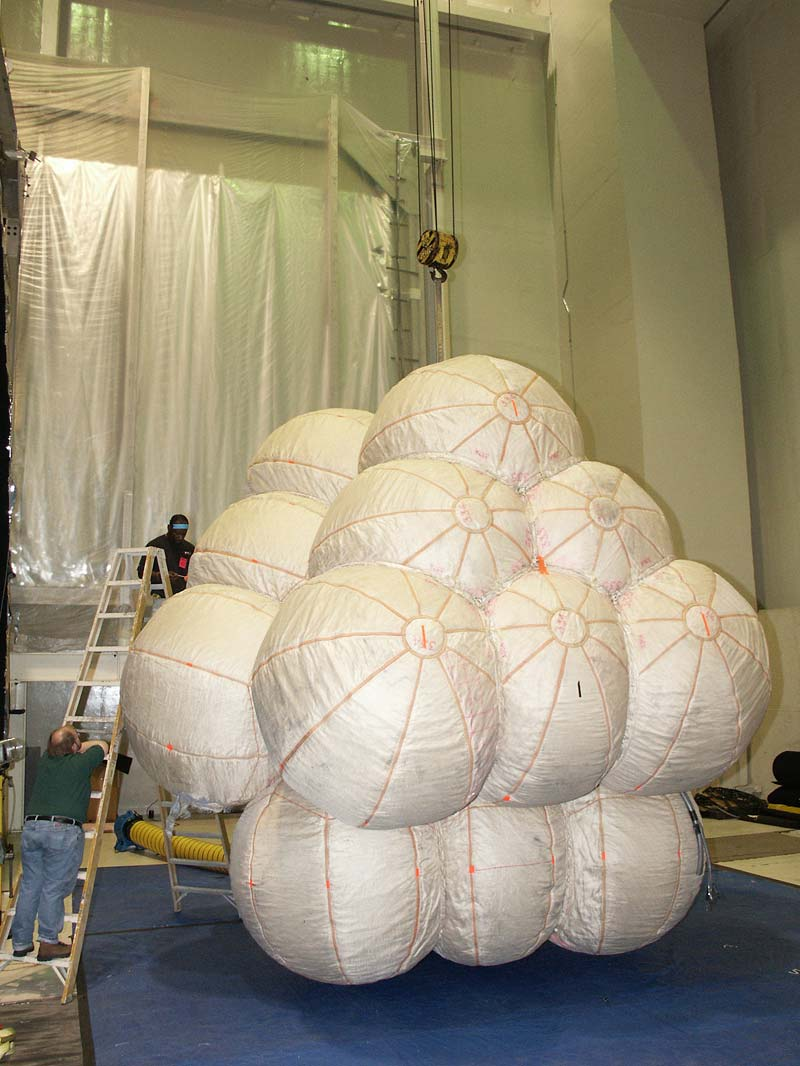
Inflated airbag in the lab

Airbags used in the Mars Exploration Rover mission are the same type that Mars Pathfinder used in 1997. They had to be strong enough to cushion the spacecraft if it landed on rocks or rough terrain and allow it to bounce across Mars's surface at highway speeds (about 100 km/h) after landing. The airbags had to be inflated seconds before touchdown and deflated once safely on the ground.

The airbags were made of Vectran, like those on Pathfinder. Vectran has almost twice the strength of other synthetic materials, such as Kevlar, and performs better in cold temperatures. Six 100 denier (10 mg/m) layers of Vectran protected one or two inner bladders of Vectran in 200 denier (20 mg/m). Using 100 denier (10 mg/m) leaves more fabric in the outer layers where it is needed, because there are more threads in the weave.

Each rover used four airbags with six lobes each, all of which were connected. Connection was important, since it helped abate some of the landing forces by keeping the bag system flexible and responsive to ground pressure. The airbags were not attached directly to the rover, but were held to it by ropes crisscrossing the bag structure. The ropes gave the bags shape, making inflation easier. While in flight, the bags were stowed along with three gas generators that are used for inflation.

=== Lander ===
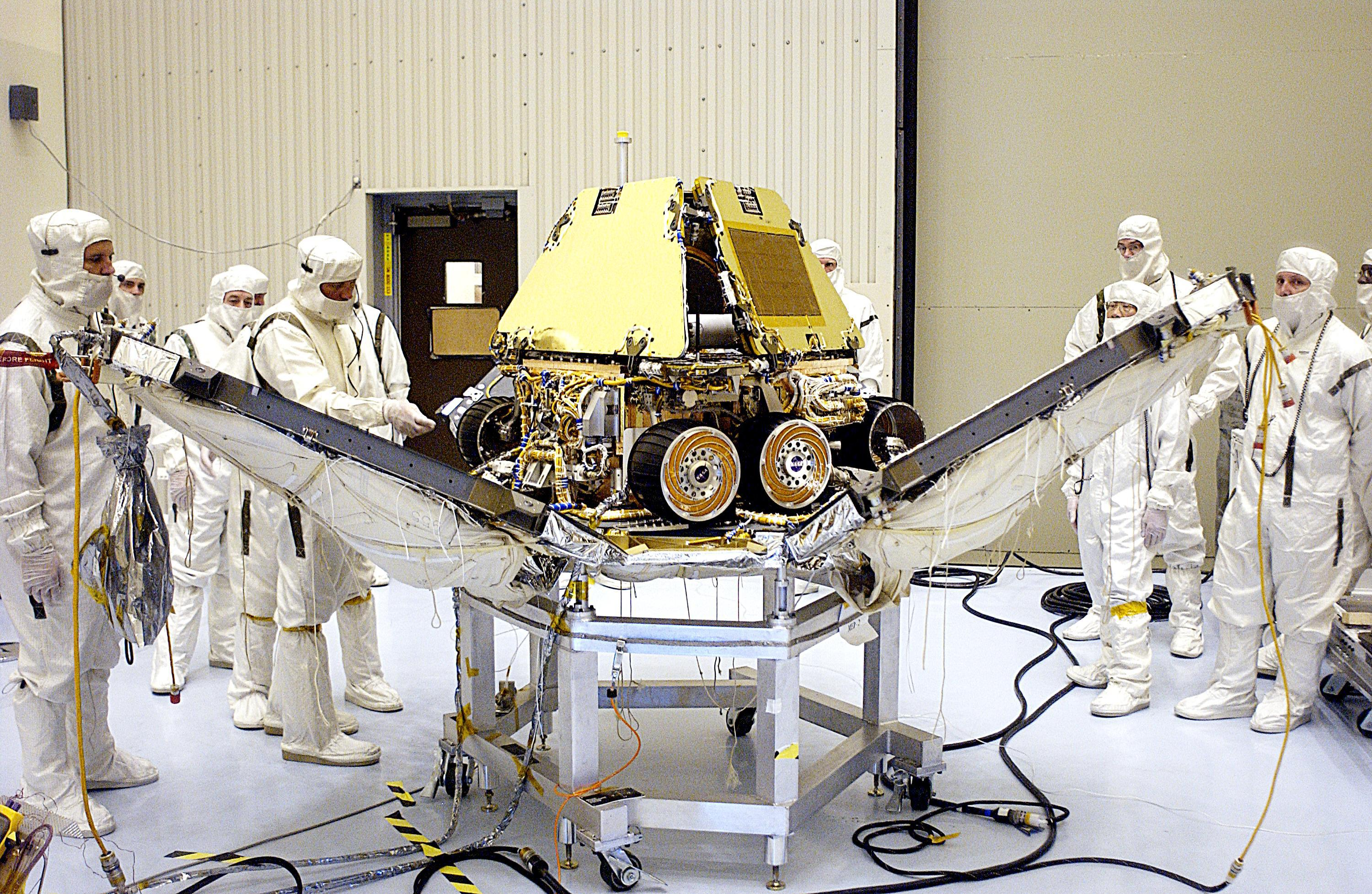
MER lander petals opening

The spacecraft lander is a protective shell that houses the rover, and together with the airbags, protects it from the forces of impact.

The lander is a tetrahedron shape, whose sides open like petals. It is strong and light, and made of beams and sheets. The beams consist of layers of graphite fiber woven into a fabric that is lighter than aluminium and more rigid than steel. Titanium fittings are glued and fitted onto the beams to allow it to be bolted together. The rover was held inside the lander by bolts and special nuts that were released after landing with small explosives.

==== Uprighting ====
After the lander stopped bouncing and rolling on the ground, it came to rest on the base of the tetrahedron or one of its sides. The sides then opened to make the base horizontal and the rover upright. The sides are connected to the base by hinges, each of which has a motor strong enough to lift the lander. The rover plus lander has a mass of about 533 kilograms (1,175 lb). The rover alone has a mass of about 185 kg (408 lb). The gravity on Mars is about 38% of Earth's, so the motor does not need to be as powerful as it would on Earth.

The rover contains accelerometers to detect which way is down (toward the surface of Mars) by measuring the pull of gravity. The rover computer then commanded the correct lander petal to open to place the rover upright. Once the base petal was down and the rover was upright, the other two petals were opened.

The petals initially opened to an equally flat position, so all sides of the lander were straight and level. The petal motors are strong enough so that if two of the petals come to rest on rocks, the base with the rover would be held in place like a bridge above the ground. The base will hold at a level even with the height of the petals resting on rocks, making a straight flat surface throughout the length of the open, flattened lander. The flight team on Earth could then send commands to the rover to adjust the petals and create a safe path for the rover to drive off the lander and onto the Martian surface without dropping off a steep rock.

==== Moving the payload onto Mars ====
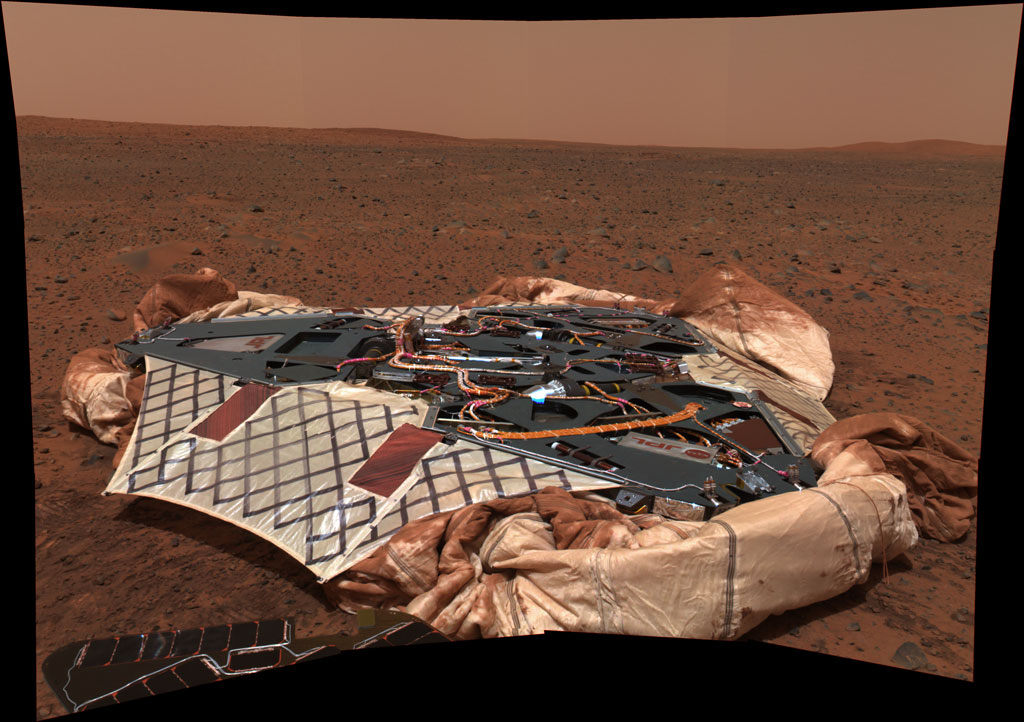
Spirit's lander on Mars

The moving of the rover off the lander is called the egress phase of the mission. The rover must avoid having its wheels caught in the airbag material or falling off a sharp incline. To help this, a retraction system on the petals slowly drags the airbags toward the lander before the petals open. Small ramps on the petals fan out to fill spaces between the petals. They cover uneven terrain, rock obstacles, and airbag material, and form a circular area from which the rover can drive off in more directions. They also lower the step that the rover must climb down. They are nicknamed "batwings", and are made of Vectran cloth.

About three hours were allotted to retract the airbags and deploy the lander petals.

== Rover design ==
Interactive 3D model of the MER

Schematic drawing of the MER

The rovers are six-wheeled, solar-powered robots that stand 1.5 m (4.9 ft) high, 2.3 m (7.5 ft) wide and 1.6 m (5.2 ft) long. They weigh 180 kg (400 lb), 35 kg (77 lb) of which is the wheel and suspension system.

The main box-like chassis forms the Warm Electronics Box (WEB).

=== Drive system ===
Each rover has six aluminium wheels mounted on a rocker-bogie suspension system, similar to that on Sojourner, that ensures wheels remain on the ground while driving over rough terrain. The design reduces the range of motion of the rover body by half, and allows the rover to go over obstacles or through holes (depressions) that are more than a wheel diameter (250 millimeters (9.8 in)) in size. The rover wheels are designed with integral compliant flexures which provide shock absorption during movement. Additionally, the wheels have cleats which provide grip for climbing in soft sand and scrambling over rocks.

Each wheel has its own drive motor. The two front and two rear wheels each have individual steering motors. This allows the vehicle to turn in place, a full revolution, and to swerve and curve, making arcing turns. The motors for the rovers have been designed by the Swiss company Maxon Motor. The rover is designed to withstand a tilt of 45 degrees in any direction without overturning. However, the rover is programmed through its "fault protection limits" in its hazard avoidance software to avoid exceeding tilts of 30 degrees.

Each rover can spin one of its front wheels in place to grind deep into the terrain. It is to remain motionless while the digging wheel is spinning. The rovers have a top speed on flat hard ground of 50 mm/s (2 in/s). The average speed is 10 mm/s, because its hazard avoidance software causes it to stop every 10 seconds for 20 seconds to observe and understand the terrain into which it has driven.

=== Power and electronic systems ===
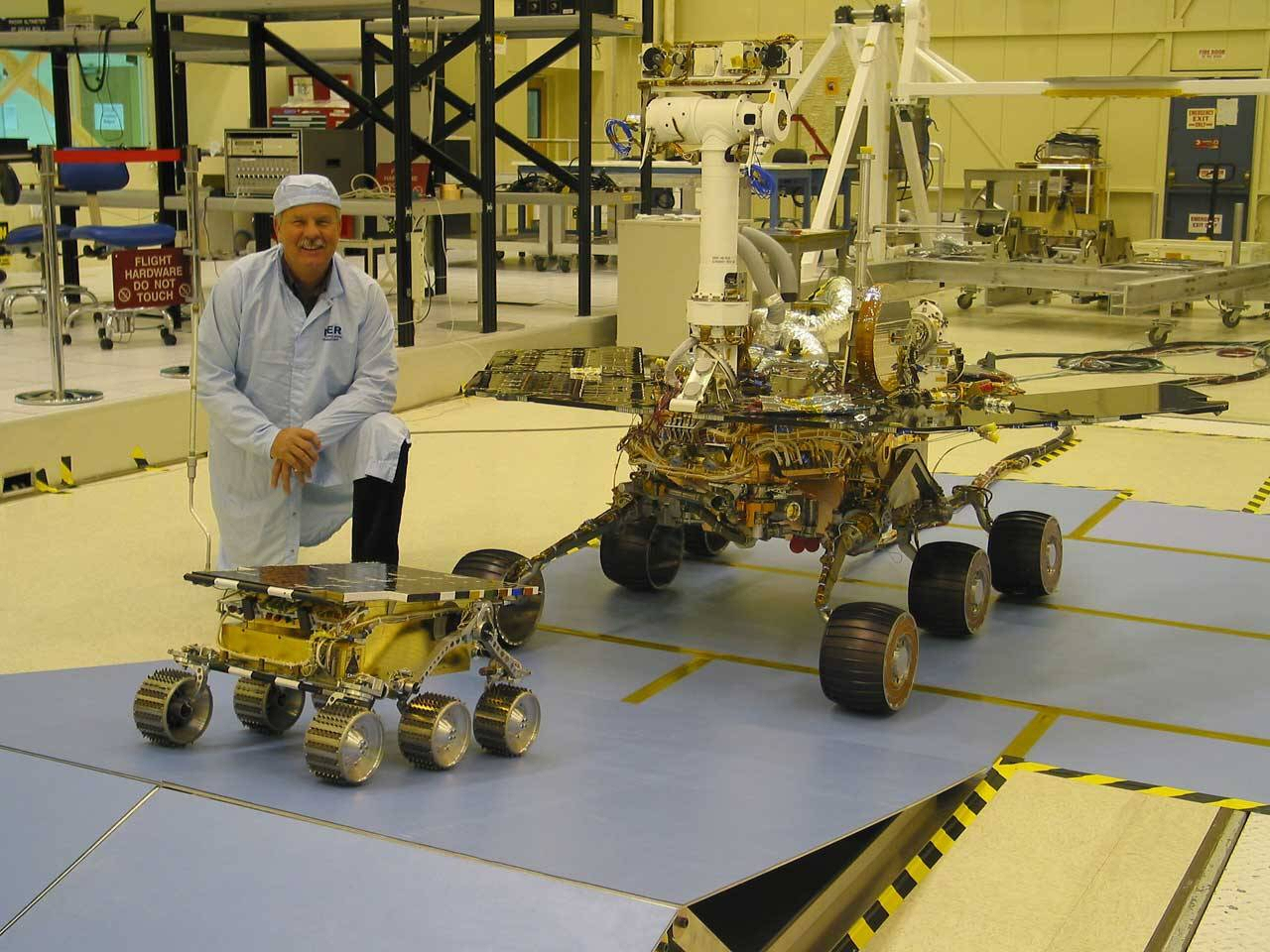
Mars Exploration Rover (rear) and Sojourner rover

When fully illuminated, the rover triplejunction solar arrays generate about 140 watts for up to four hours per Martian day (sol). The rover needs about 100 watts to drive. Its power system includes two rechargeable lithium ion batteries weighing 7.15 kg (15.8 lb) each, that provide energy when the sun is not shining, especially at night. Over time, the batteries will degrade and will not be able to recharge to full capacity.

It was thought that by the end of the 90-sol mission, the capability of the solar arrays to generate power would likely be reduced to about 50 watts. This was due to anticipated dust coverage on the solar arrays, and the change in season. Over three Earth years later, however, the rovers' power supplies hovered between 300 watt-hours and 900 watt-hours per day, depending on dust coverage. Cleaning events (dust removal by wind) have occurred more often than NASA expected, keeping the arrays relatively free of dust and extending the life of the mission. During a 2007 global dust storm on Mars, both rovers experienced some of the lowest power of the mission; Opportunity dipped to 128 watt-hours. In November 2008, Spirit had overtaken this low-energy record with a production of 89 watt-hours, due to dust storms in the region of Gusev crater.

The rovers run a VxWorks embedded operating system on a radiation-hardened 20 MHz RAD6000 CPU with 128 MB of DRAM with error detection and correction and 3 MB of EEPROM. Each rover also has 256 MB of flash memory. To survive during the various mission phases, the rover's vital instruments must stay within a temperature of −40 °C to +40 °C (−40 °F to 104 °F). At night, the rovers are heated by eight radioisotope heater units (RHU), which each continuously generate 1 W of thermal energy from the decay of radioisotopes, along with electrical heaters that operate only when necessary. A sputtered gold film and a layer of silica aerogel are used for insulation.

=== Communication ===
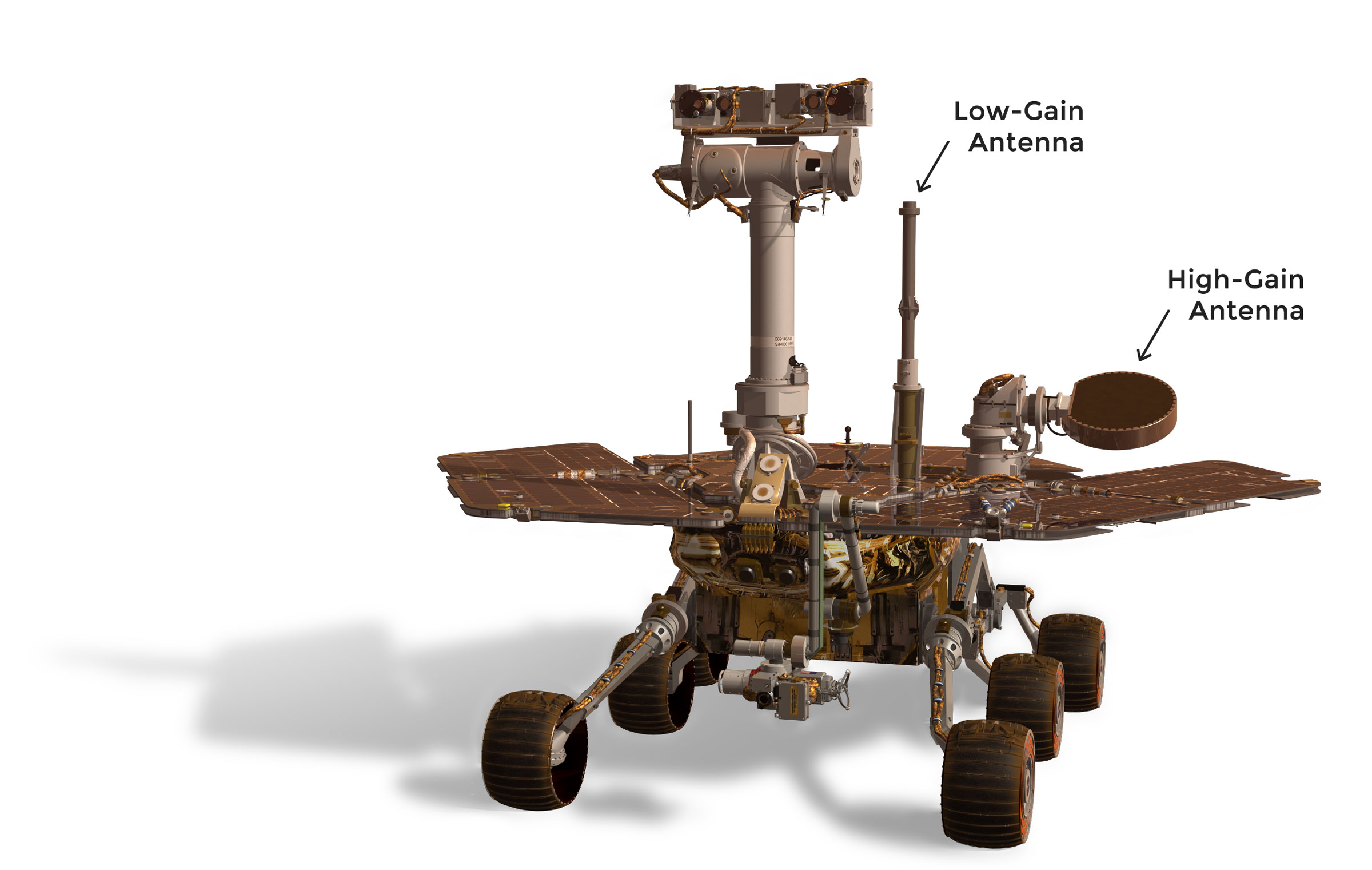
MER antennas

The rover has an X band low-gain and an X band high-gain antenna for communications to and from the Earth, as well as an ultra high frequency monopole antenna for relay communications. The low-gain antenna is omnidirectional, and transmits data at a low rate to Deep Space Network antennas on Earth. The high-gain antenna is directional and steerable, and can transmit data to Earth at a higher rate. The rovers use the UHF monopole and its CE505 radio to communicate with spacecraft orbiting Mars, the Mars Odyssey and (before its failure) the Mars Global Surveyor (already more than 7.6 terabits of data were transferred using its Mars Relay antenna and Mars Orbiter Camera's memory buffer of 12 MB). Since MRO went into orbit around Mars, the landers have also used it as a relay asset. Most of the lander data is relayed to Earth through Odyssey and MRO. The orbiters can receive rover signals at a much higher data rate than the Deep Space Network can, due to the much shorter distances from rover to orbiter. The orbiters then quickly relay the rover data to the Earth using their large and high-powered antennas.

=== Scientific instrumentation ===
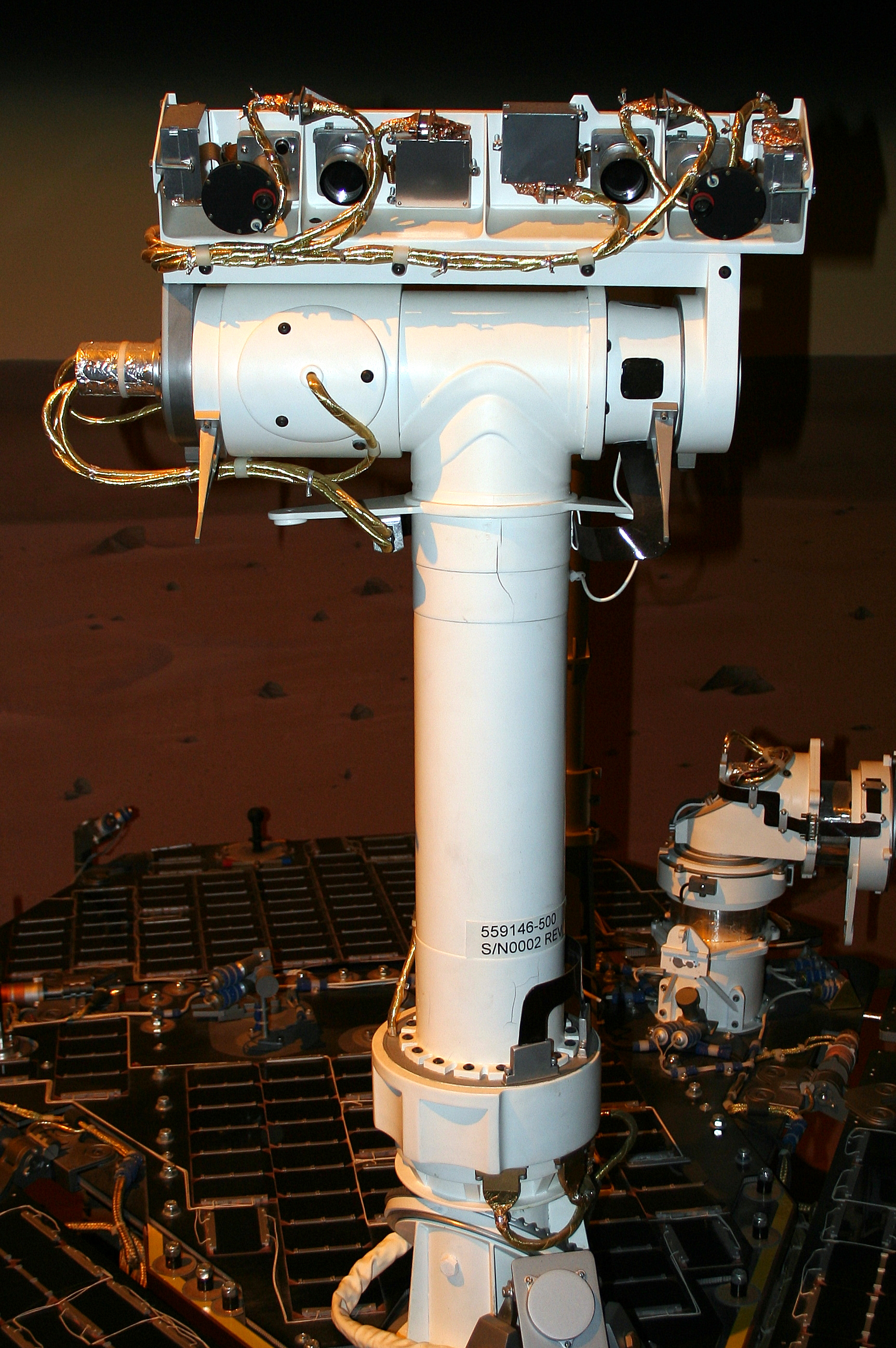
Pancam Mast Assembly (PMA)

Each rover has nine cameras, which produce 1024-pixel by 1024-pixel images at 12 bits per pixel, but most navigation camera images and image thumbnails are truncated to 8 bits per pixel to conserve memory and transmission time. All images are then compressed using ICER before being stored and sent to Earth. Navigation, thumbnail, and many other image types are compressed to approximately 0.8 to 1.1 bits/pixel. Lower bit rates (less than 0.5-bit/pixel) are used for certain wavelengths of multi-color panoramic images. ICER is based on wavelets, and was designed specifically for deep-space applications. It produces progressive compression, both lossless and lossy, and incorporates an error-containment scheme to limit the effects of data loss on the deep-space channel. It outperforms the lossy JPEG image compressor and the lossless Rice compressor used by the Mars Pathfinder mission.

Several cameras and instruments were mounted on the Pancam Mast Assembly (PMA):

- Panoramic Cameras (Pancam), two cameras with color filter wheels for determining the texture, color, mineralogy, and structure of the local terrain. Two cameras work in combination to take detailed, multi-wavelength, 3-D panoramic pictures of the Martian landscape surrounding the rover, sky and the Sun. There are 30 cm between two cameras. Each camera had filters for 400-1100 nm (near-UV to near-IR), with maximum image resolution of 1024 x 1024 pixels.
- Navigation Cameras (Navcam), two cameras that have larger fields of view but lower resolution and are monochromatic, for navigation and driving.
- A periscope assembly for the Miniature Thermal Emission Spectrometer (Mini-TES), an infrared spectrometer used to determine the mineralogy of rocks and soils from a distance by detecting their patterns of thermal radiation. It was specially tuned to look for minerals formed in water, like carbonates and clays. The periscope assembly features two beryllium fold mirrors, a shroud that closes to minimize dust contamination in the assembly, and stray-light rejection baffles that are strategically placed within the graphite epoxy tubes. The Mini-TES was built by Arizona State University.

The cameras were mounted 1.5 meters high on the Pancam Mast Assembly, which allows 360-degree rotation. The PMA is deployed via the Mast Deployment Drive (MDD). The Azimuth Drive, mounted directly above the MDD, turned the assembly horizontally a whole revolution with signals transmitted through a rolling tape configuration. The camera drive points the cameras in elevation, almost straight up or down. A third motor points the Mini-TES fold mirrors and protective shroud, up to 30° above the horizon and 50° below.

Four monochromatic Hazard Avoidance Cameras (Hazcams) were mounted on the rover's body, two in front and two behind. The rover used pairs of Hazcam images to map out the shape of the terrain as far as 3 meters (10 feet) in front of it, in a "wedge" shape that is over 4 meters wide at the farthest distance.

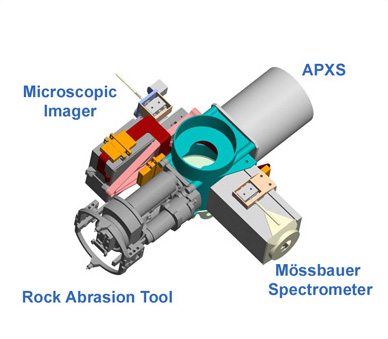
Instruments on the rover's arm

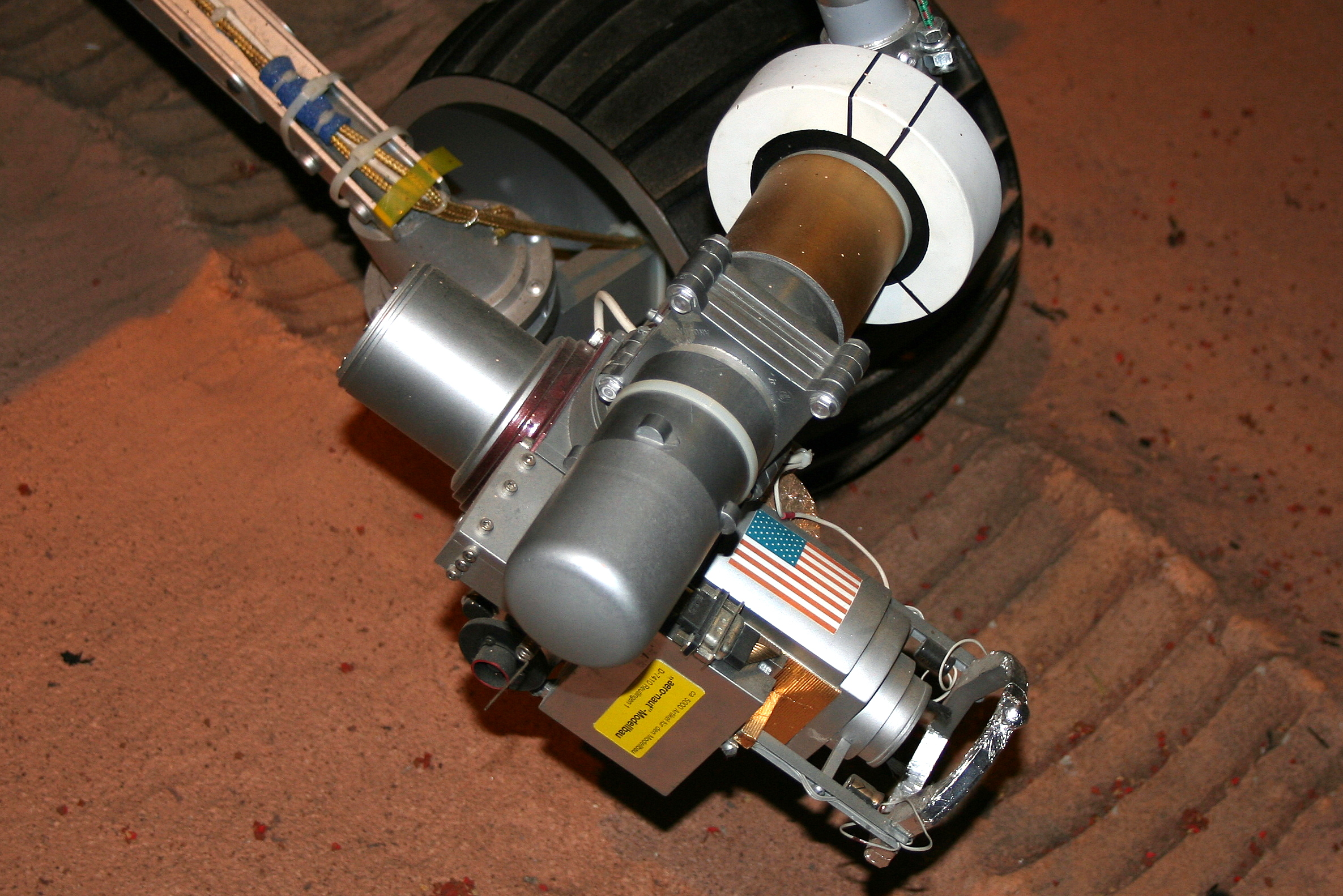
Rock Abrasion Tool (RAT)

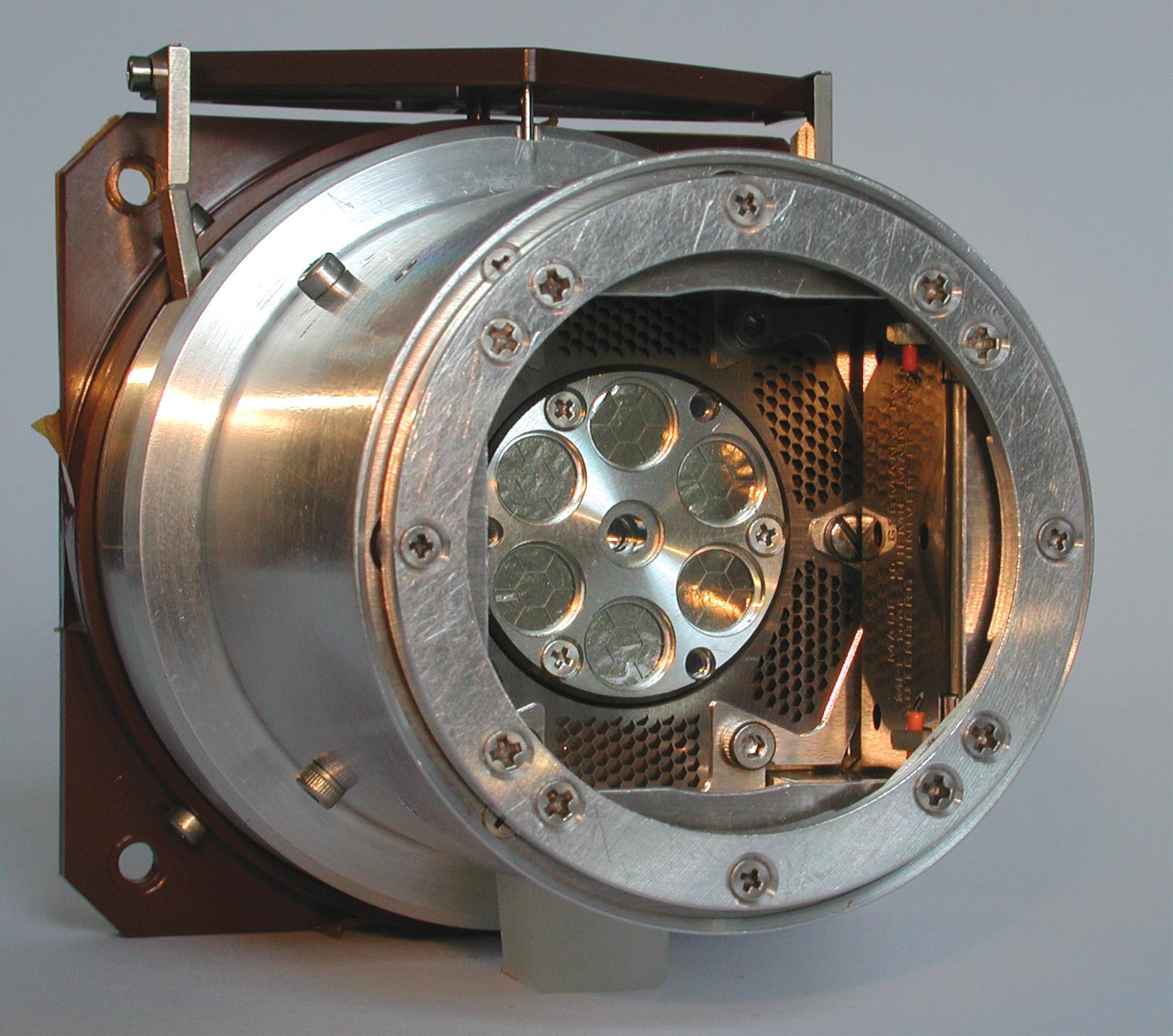
Alpha particle X-ray spectrometer (APXS)

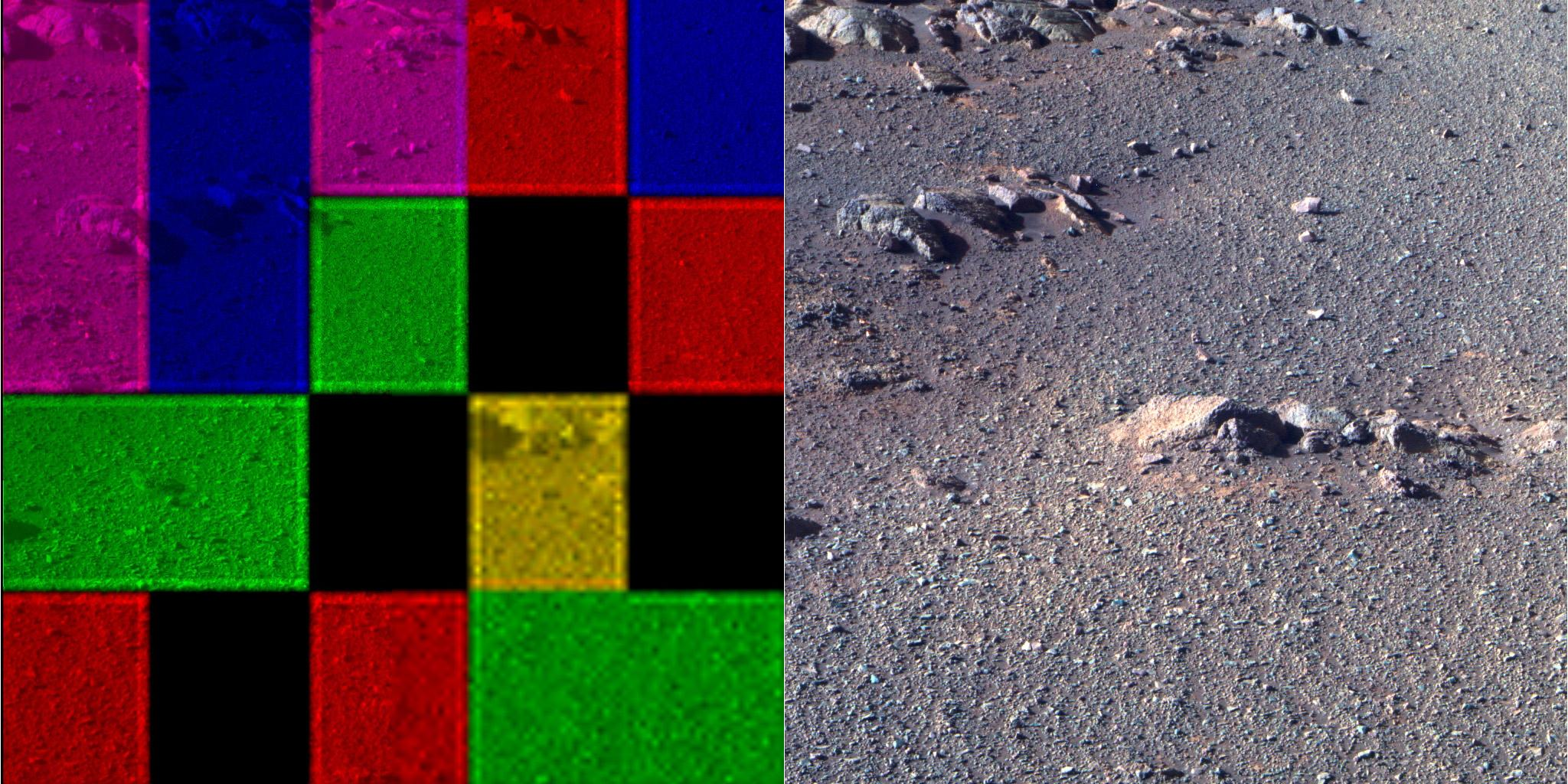
MER photo before and after processing

The instrument deployment device (IDD), also called the rover arm. The arm has a turret shaped like a cross that holds several instruments. The arm can spin through a 350-degree turning range and rotate vertically through 340-degree range. The arm has three joint and a maximum reach of 90 centimeters.

- Mössbauer spectrometer (MB) MIMOS II, developed by Göstar Klingelhöfer at the Johannes Gutenberg University in Mainz, Germany, was used for close-up investigations of the mineralogy of iron-bearing rocks and soils. One Mössbauer measurement took about 12 hours.
- Alpha particle X-ray spectrometer (APXS), developed by the Max Planck Institute for Chemistry in Mainz, Germany, was used to determines the elemental chemistry of rocks and soils using alpha particles and X-rays. Most APXS measurements were taken at night and required at least 10 hours of accumulation time.
- Magnet array were used for collecting magnetic dust particles. There were seven magnets on each rover: four magnets were carried by the Rock Abrasion Tool (RAT); two magnets (one capture magnet and one filter magnet) were mounted on the front of the rover; another magnet (sweep magnet) was mounted on the top of the rover deck in view of the Pancam. The particles were analyzed by the Mössbauer Spectrometer and X-ray Spectrometer to help determine the ratio of magnetic particles to non-magnetic particles and the composition of magnetic minerals in airborne dust and rocks that have been ground by the Rock Abrasion Tool.
- Microscopic Imager (MI) for obtaining close-up, black-and-white high-resolution images of rocks and soils, with maximum resolution of 1024 x 1024 pixels. Development was led by Ken Herkenhoff's team at the U.S. Geological Survey Astrogeology Research Program. The Microscopic Imager is a combination of a microscope and a CCD camera.
- Rock Abrasion Tool (RAT), developed by Honeybee Robotics, for removing dusty and weathered rock surfaces and exposing fresh material for examination by instruments on board. It was able to create a hole around 2 inches (45 millimeters) in diameter and 0.2 inch (5 millimeters) deep in a rock, and able to grind through hard volcanic rock in about two hours. RAT used three electric motors to drive rotating grinding teeth into the surface of a rock. Two grinding wheels rotate at high speeds. These wheels also rotate around each other at a much slower speed so that the two grinding wheels sweep the entire cutting area.

The robotic arm was able to place instruments directly up against rock and soil targets of interest.

== Naming of Spirit and Opportunity ==
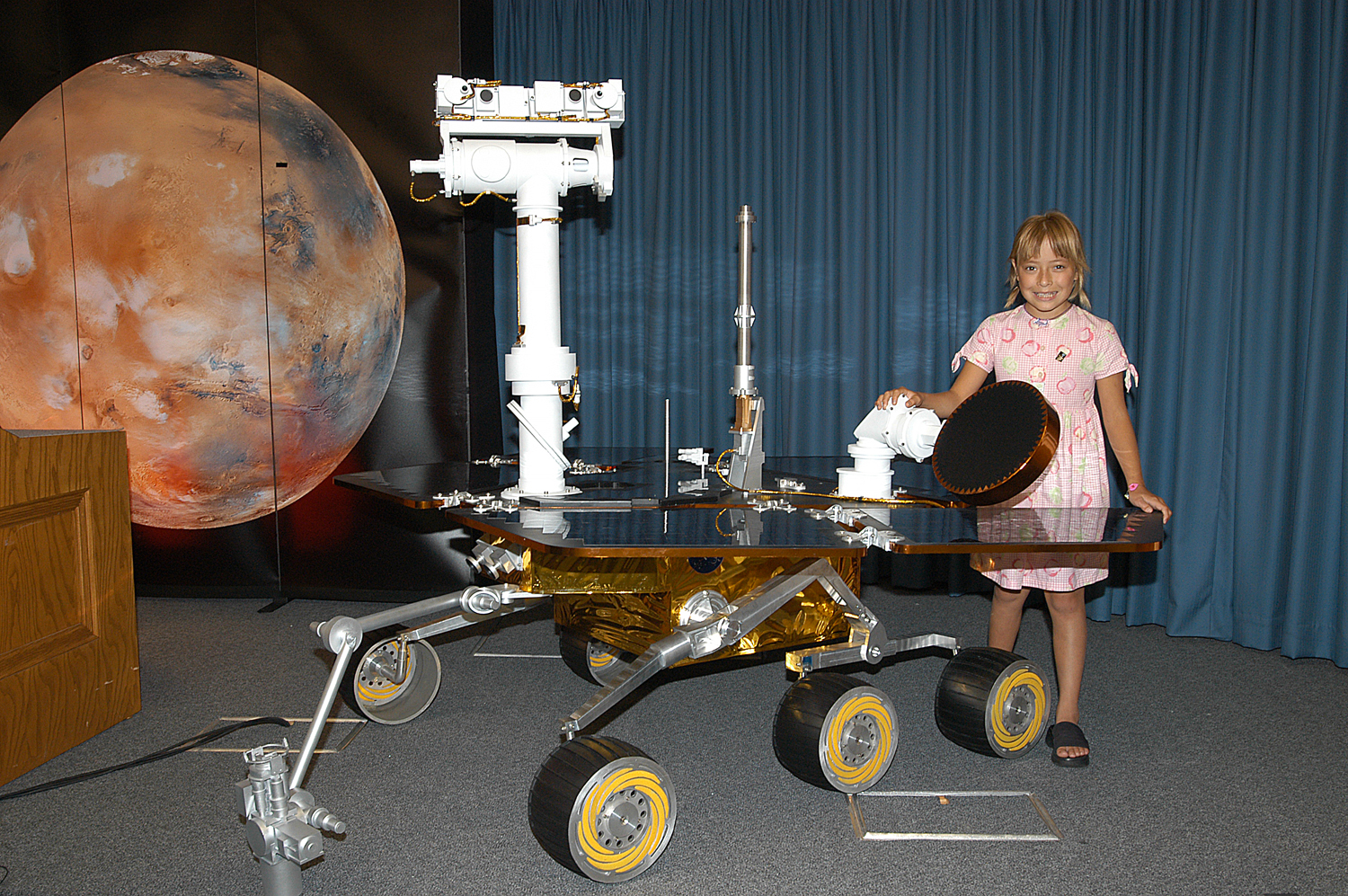
Sofi Collis with a model of Mars Exploration Rover

The Spirit and Opportunity rovers were named through a student essay competition. The winning entry was by Sofi Collis, a third-grade Russian-American student from Arizona.

I used to live in an orphanage. It was dark and cold and lonely. At night, I looked up at the sparkly sky and felt better. I dreamed I could fly there. In America, I can make all my dreams come true. Thank you for the 'Spirit' and the 'Opportunity.'
— Sofi Collis, age 9

Prior to this, during the development and building of the rovers, they were known as MER-1 Rover 1 (Opportunity) and MER-2 Rover 2 (Spirit). Internally, NASA also uses the mission designations MER-A (Spirit) and MER-B (Opportunity) based on the order of landing on Mars.

== Test rovers ==
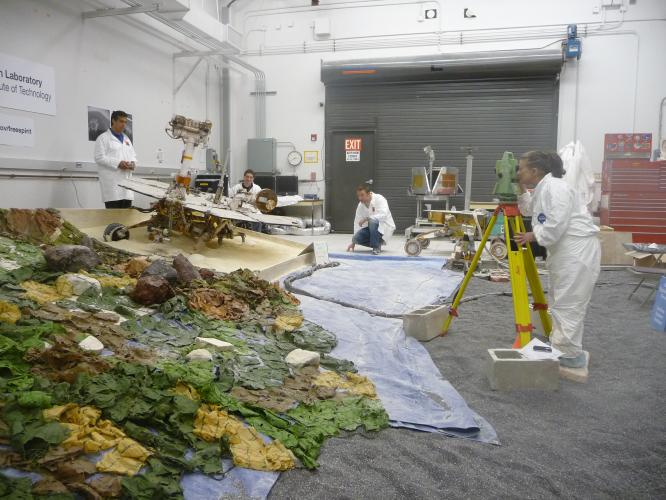
Rover team members simulate Spirit in a Martian sandtrap.

The Jet Propulsion Laboratory maintains a pair of rovers, the Surface System Test-Beds (SSTB) at its location in Pasadena for testing and modeling of situations on Mars. One test rover, SSTB1, weighing approximately 180 kg (400 lb), is fully instrumented and nearly identical to Spirit and Opportunity. Another test version, SSTB-Lite, is identical in size and drive characteristics but does not include all instruments. It weighs 80 kg (180 lb), much closer to the weight of Spirit and Opportunity in the reduced gravity of Mars. These rovers were used in 2009 for a simulation of the incident in which Spirit became trapped in soft soil.

== Planetary science findings ==
=== Spirit Landing Site, Gusev Crater ===
==== Plains ====
Although the Gusev crater appears from orbital images to be a dry lakebed, the observations from the surface show the interior plains mostly filled with debris. The rocks on the plains of Gusev are a type of basalt. They contain the minerals olivine, pyroxene, plagioclase, and magnetite, and they look like volcanic basalt as they are fine-grained with irregular holes (geologists would say they have vesicles and vugs). Much of the soil on the plains came from the breakdown of the local rocks. Fairly high levels of nickel were found in some soils, probably from meteorites. Analysis shows that the rocks have been slightly altered by tiny amounts of water. Outside coatings and cracks inside the rocks suggest water deposited minerals, maybe bromine compounds. All the rocks contain a fine coating of dust and one or more harder rinds of material. One type can be brushed off, while another needed to be ground off by the Rock Abrasion Tool (RAT).

==== Dust ====
The dust in Gusev Crater is the same as dust all around the planet. All the dust was found to be magnetic. Moreover, Spirit found the magnetism was caused by the mineral magnetite, especially magnetite that contained the element titanium. One magnet was able to completely divert all dust hence all Martian dust is thought to be magnetic. The spectra of the dust was similar to spectra of bright, low thermal inertia regions like Tharsis and Arabia that have been detected by orbiting satellites. A thin layer of dust, maybe less than one millimeter thick covers all surfaces. Something in it contains a small amount of chemically bound water.

==== Columbia Hills ====
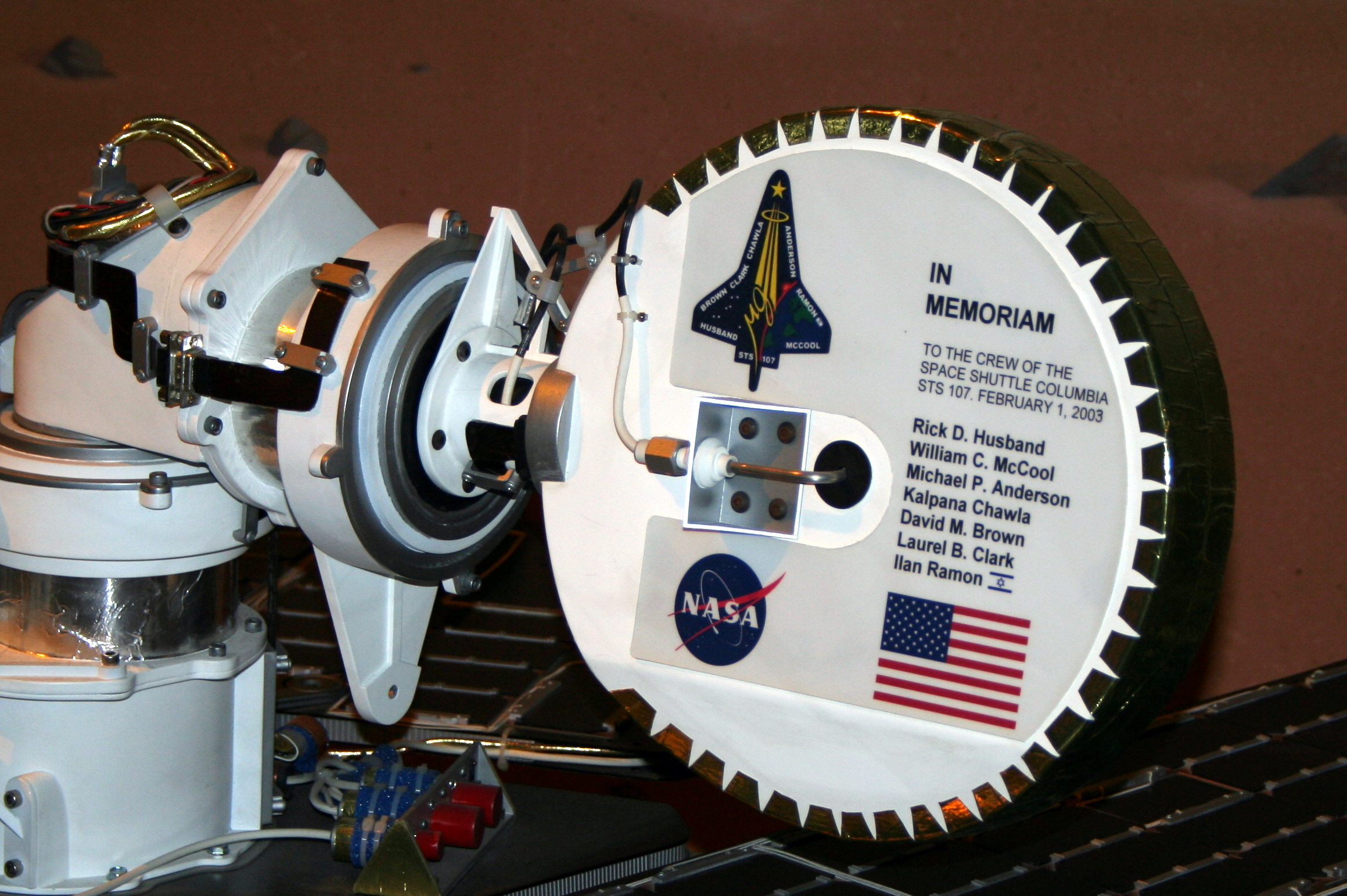
Spirit contains a memorial to the crew of the Space Shuttle Columbia's STS-107 2003 mission, which disintegrated during reentry.

As the rover climbed above the plains onto the Columbia Hills, the mineralogy that was seen changed. Scientists found a variety of rock types in the Columbia Hills, and they placed them into six different categories. The six are: Clovis, Wishbone, Peace, Watchtower, Backstay, and Independence. They are named after a prominent rock in each group. Their chemical compositions, as measured by APXS, are significantly different from each other. Most importantly, all of the rocks in Columbia Hills show various degrees of alteration due to aqueous fluids. They are enriched in the elements phosphorus, sulfur, chlorine, and bromine—all of which can be carried around in water solutions. The Columbia Hills' rocks contain basaltic glass, along with varying amounts of olivine and sulfates. The olivine abundance varies inversely with the amount of sulfates. This is exactly what is expected because water destroys olivine but helps to produce sulfates.

The Clovis group is especially interesting because the Mössbauer spectrometer (MB) detected goethite in it. Goethite forms only in the presence of water, so its discovery is the first direct evidence of past water in the Columbia Hills's rocks. In addition, the MB spectra of rocks and outcrops displayed a strong decline in olivine presence, although the rocks probably once contained much olivine. Olivine is a marker for the lack of water because it easily decomposes in the presence of water. Sulfate was found, and it needs water to form. Wishstone contained a great deal of plagioclase, some olivine, and anhydrate (a sulfate). Peace rocks showed sulfur and strong evidence for bound water, so hydrated sulfates are suspected. Watchtower class rocks lack olivine consequently they may have been altered by water. The Independence class showed some signs of clay (perhaps montmorillonite a member of the smectite group). Clays require fairly long term exposure to water to form. One type of soil, called Paso Robles, from the Columbia Hills, may be an evaporate deposit because it contains large amounts of sulfur, phosphorus, calcium, and iron. Also, MB found that much of the iron in Paso Robles soil was of the oxidized, Fe^{3+} form. Towards the middle of the six-year mission (a mission that was supposed to last only 90 days), large amounts of pure silica were found in the soil. The silica could have come from the interaction of soil with acid vapors produced by volcanic activity in the presence of water or from water in a hot spring environment.

After Spirit stopped working scientists studied old data from the Miniature Thermal Emission Spectrometer, or Mini-TES and confirmed the presence of large amounts of carbonate-rich rocks, which means that regions of the planet may have once harbored water. The carbonates were discovered in an outcrop of rocks called "Comanche."

Spirit found evidence of slight weathering on the plains of Gusev, but no evidence that a lake was there. However, in the Columbia Hills there was clear evidence for a moderate amount of aqueous weathering. The evidence included sulfates and the minerals goethite and carbonates which only form in the presence of water. It is believed that Gusev crater may have held a lake long ago, but it has since been covered by igneous materials. All the dust contains a magnetic component which was identified as magnetite with some titanium. Furthermore, the thin coating of dust that covers everything on Mars is the same in all parts of Mars.

=== Opportunity Landing Site, Meridiani Planum ===
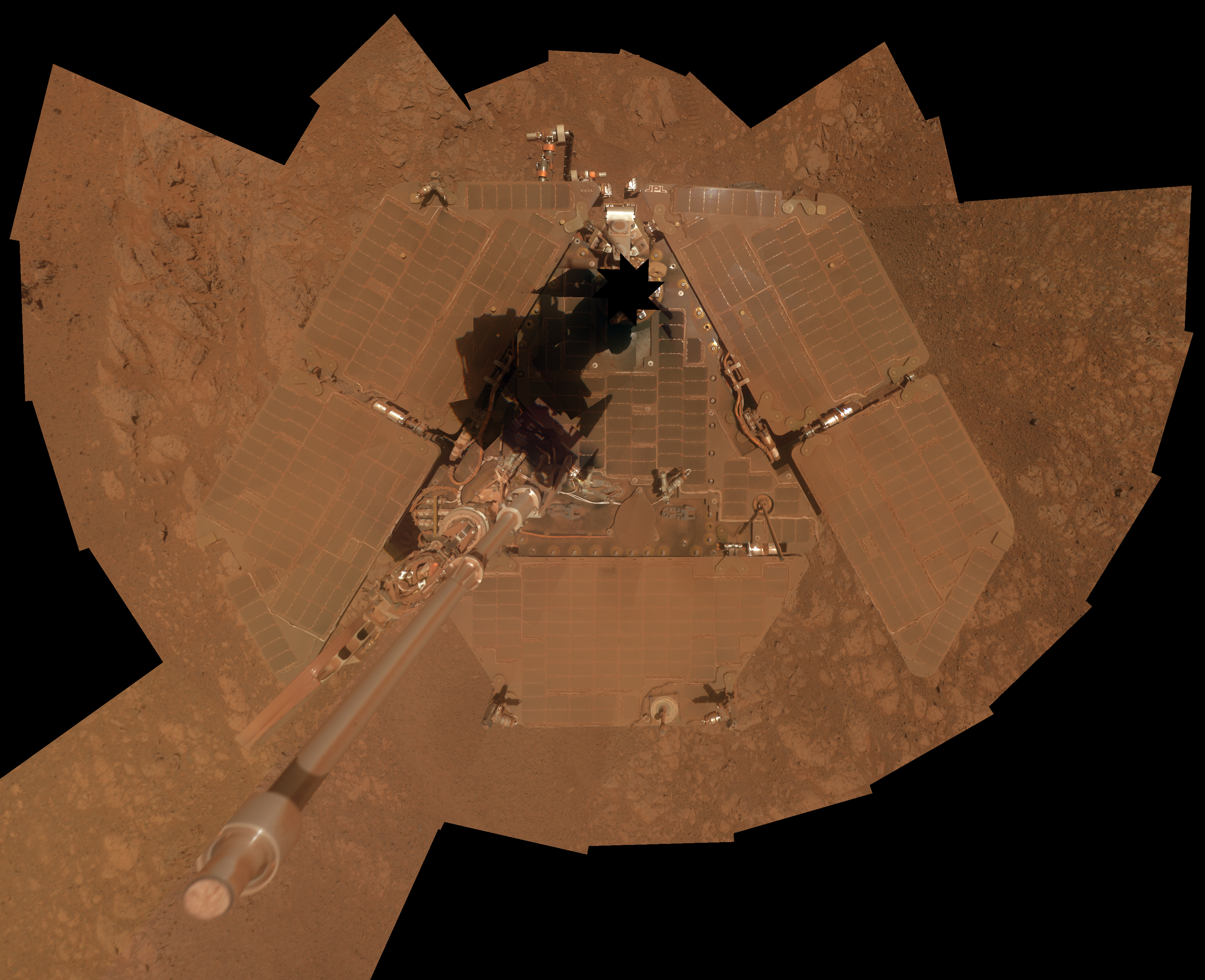
Self-portrait of Opportunity near Endeavour Crater on the surface of Mars (January 6, 2014).

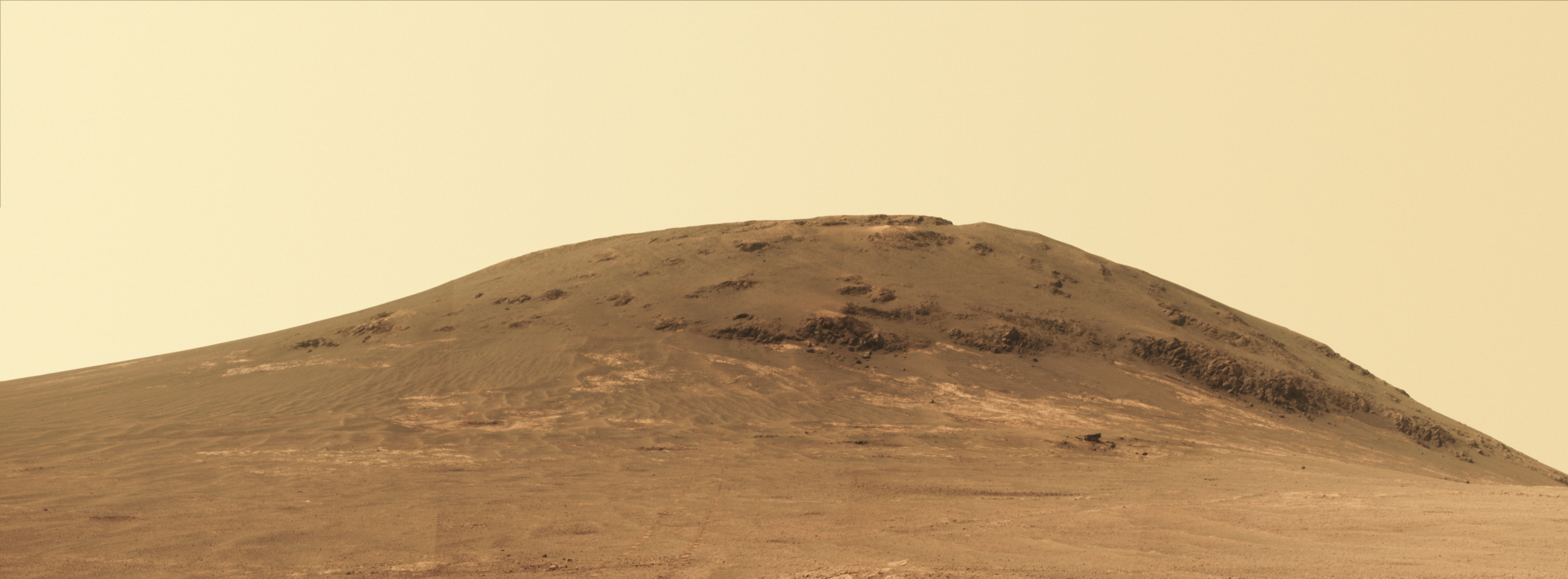
Cape Tribulation southern end, as seen in 2017 by Opportunity rover

The Opportunity rover landed in a small crater, dubbed "Eagle", on the flat plains of Meridiani. The plains of the landing site were characterized by the presence of a large number of small spherules, spherical concretions that were tagged "blueberries" by the science team, which were found both loose on the surface, and also embedded in the rock. These proved to have a high concentration of the mineral hematite, and showed the signature of being formed in an aqueous environment. The layered bedrock revealed in the crater walls showed signs of being sedimentary in nature, and compositional and microscopic-imagery analysis showed this to be primarily with composition of Jarosite, a ferrous sulfate mineral that is characteristically an evaporite that is the residue from the evaporation of a salty pond or sea.

The mission has provided substantial evidence of past water activity on Mars. In addition to investigating the "water hypothesis", Opportunity has also obtained astronomical observations and atmospheric data. The extended mission took the rover across the plains to a series of larger craters in the south, with the arrival at the edge of a 25-km diameter crater, Endeavour Crater, eight years after landing. The orbital spectroscopy of this crater rim show the signs of phyllosilicate rocks, indicative of older sedimentary deposits.

== See also ==
- Aeolis quadrangle
- Syd Lieberman (Official storyteller of the Mars Exploration Mission)
