= Donald B. Bickler =

American engineer; inventor of the rocker-bogie suspension

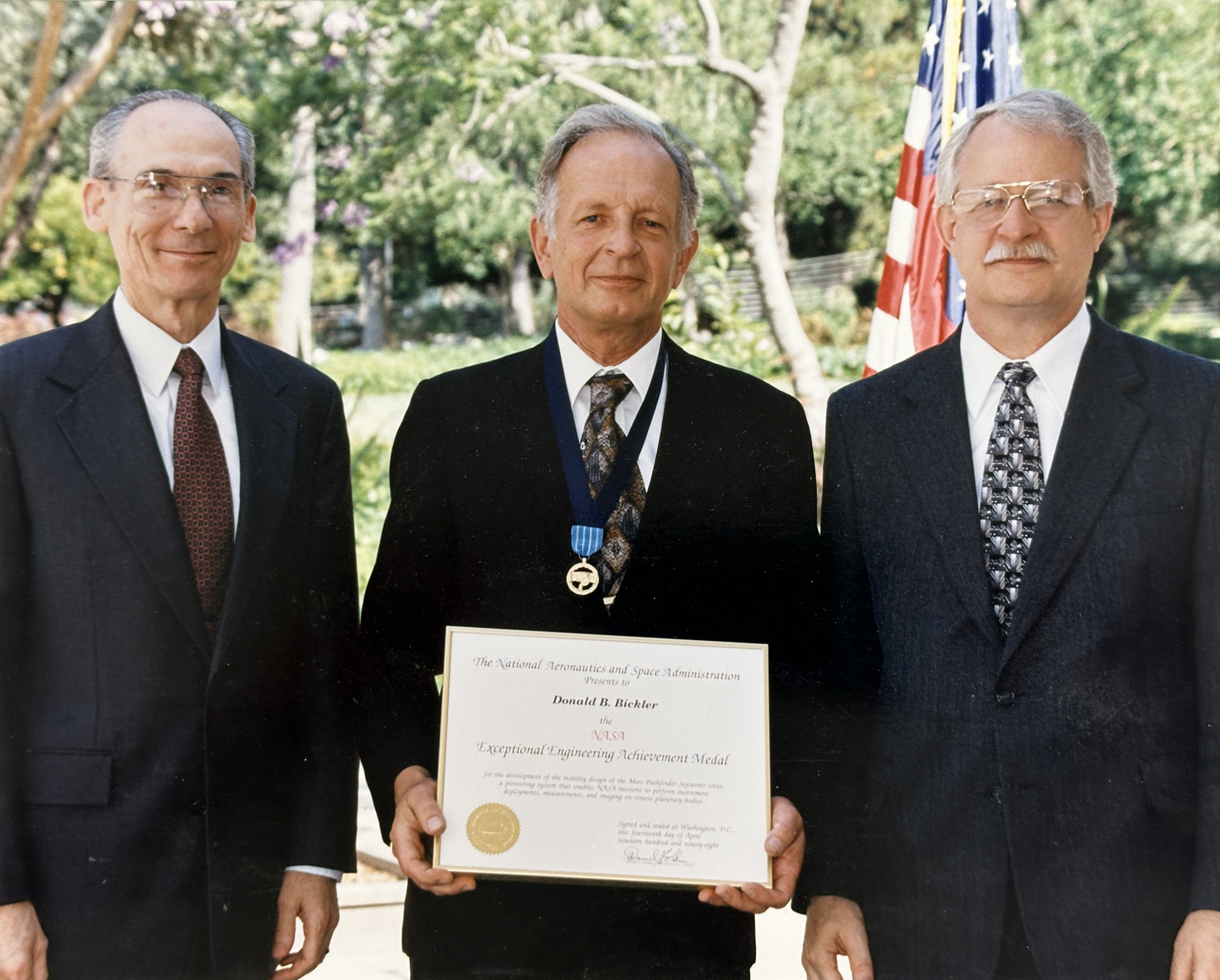
- Bickler receiving NASA's Exceptional Engineering Achievement Medal
- Education: Northwestern University (BS Mechanical Engineering, 1956)
- Occupation: Mechanical engineer
- Employer: Jet Propulsion Laboratory
- Known for: Development of the rocker-bogie suspension system used on Mars rovers
- Awards: NASA Exceptional Engineering Achievement Medal (1998); Fellow, American Society of Mechanical Engineers (2006)

Donald B. Bickler was an American mechanical engineer at NASA’s Jet Propulsion Laboratory (JPL). He is best known for developing the rocker-bogie suspension system, a six-wheeled articulated mobility architecture first used for the Sojourner rover during NASA’s 1997 Mars Pathfinder mission and later adopted for subsequent Mars rovers. His career also included earlier work in solar energy engineering and later work in rover mobility, off-road traction analysis, and wheel technologies.

== Education ==
Bickler earned a Bachelor of Science degree in Mechanical Engineering from Northwestern University in 1956.

== Early career ==
After graduating, Bickler worked in automotive and mechanical systems. While working at Stewart-Warner Corporation he was he was listed as an inventor on a U.S. patent for a gas carbureting apparatus.

By the early 1960s he was working in photovoltaic measurement and solar instrumentation. In 1963, he co-authored Solar Energy Measurement Techniques with Bernd Ross, describing measurement and calibration methods for solar cell performance in aerospace contexts. A 1967 patent lists him as an inventor of a solar radiation simulation apparatus for laboratory testing of photovoltaic devices (commonly referred to as a solar simulator).

== Career at Jet Propulsion Laboratory ==
Bickler joined NASA’s Jet Propulsion Laboratory in 1975. Over the course of more than four decades at JPL, he worked in mechanical engineering across both solar-energy technology and planetary rover mobility, and became associated in particular with the development of articulated suspension systems for Mars rovers. JPL later identified him as a principal engineer in Mechanical Engineering Section 352, while a 2012 JPL profile referred to him as leading the laboratory’s Advanced Mechanical Systems team. In the later part of his career, he also focused on training and mentoring younger engineers.

JPL publications later noted both 30 years of service (as of 2005) and his retirement in October 2017 after 42 years at JPL.

=== Solar energy engineering ===
During the late 1970s Bickler contributed to JPL solar-energy work associated with U.S. Department of Energy programs. He co-authored a DOE/JPL report summarizing an LSA Project technology development update presented at the 10th Project Integration Meeting (August 1978). In a 1979 JPL report on the SAMICS cost-analysis methodology, the author credited Bickler’s encouragement and insistence on rigorous analysis during early development as important to the methodology’s applicability and validation.

=== Rover mobility research ===
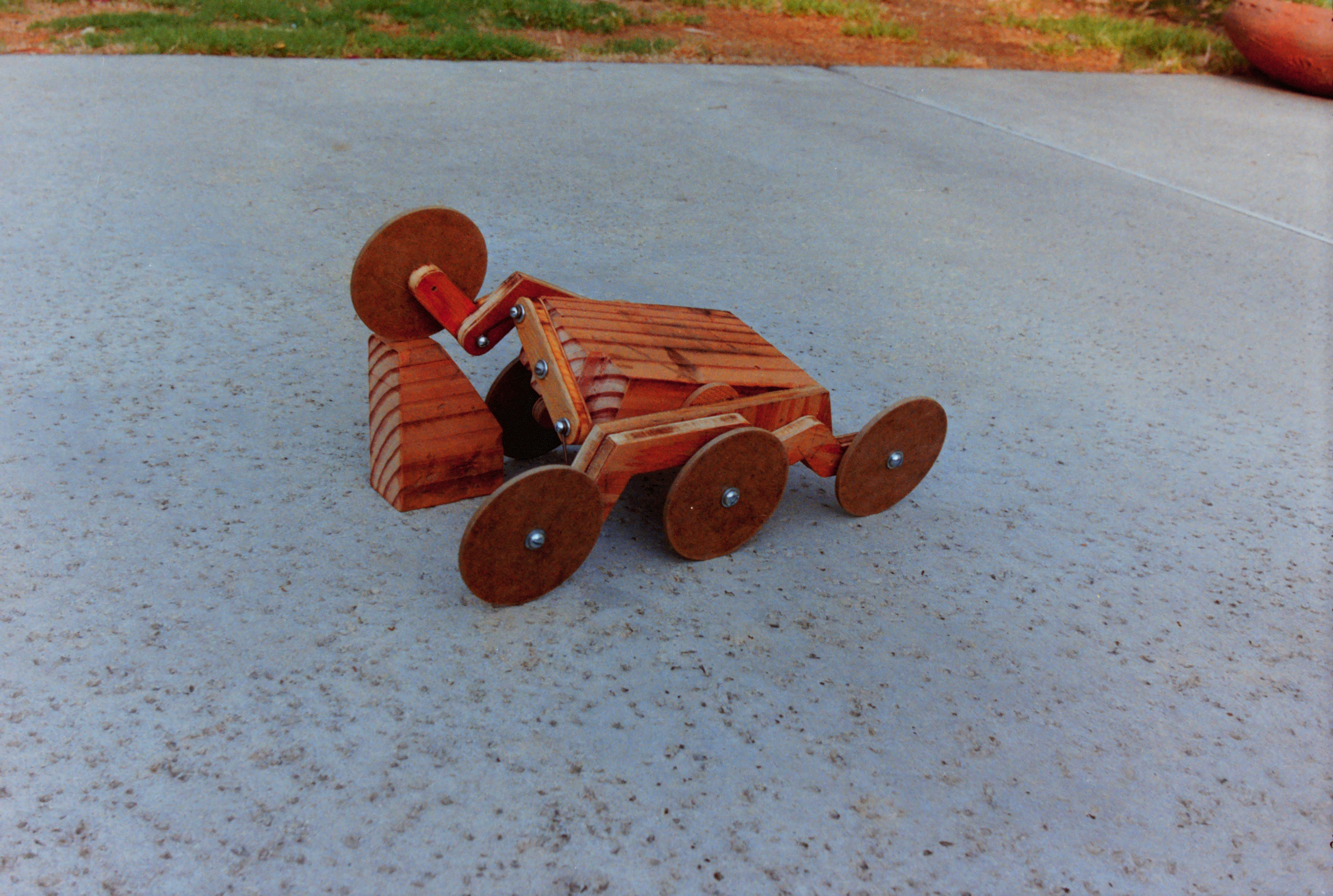
Early wooden model of Bickler's articulated suspension design.

By the late 1980s Bickler was involved in rover mobility studies at NASA’s Jet Propulsion Laboratory (JPL) during early mission planning for robotic Mars exploration. Contemporary reporting later described experimental rover prototypes developed at JPL using a six-wheel articulated mobility system created by Bickler.

==== Development of the rocker-bogie suspension ====
During early rover mission studies Bickler began developing articulated mobility concepts for planetary rovers and constructed several early rover prototypes in his garage before the rover project had formal funding.

The earliest prototype was an articulated wooden rover model that demonstrated the stability and range of motion of a springless suspension capable of maintaining wheel contact while traversing obstacles larger than a wheel diameter.

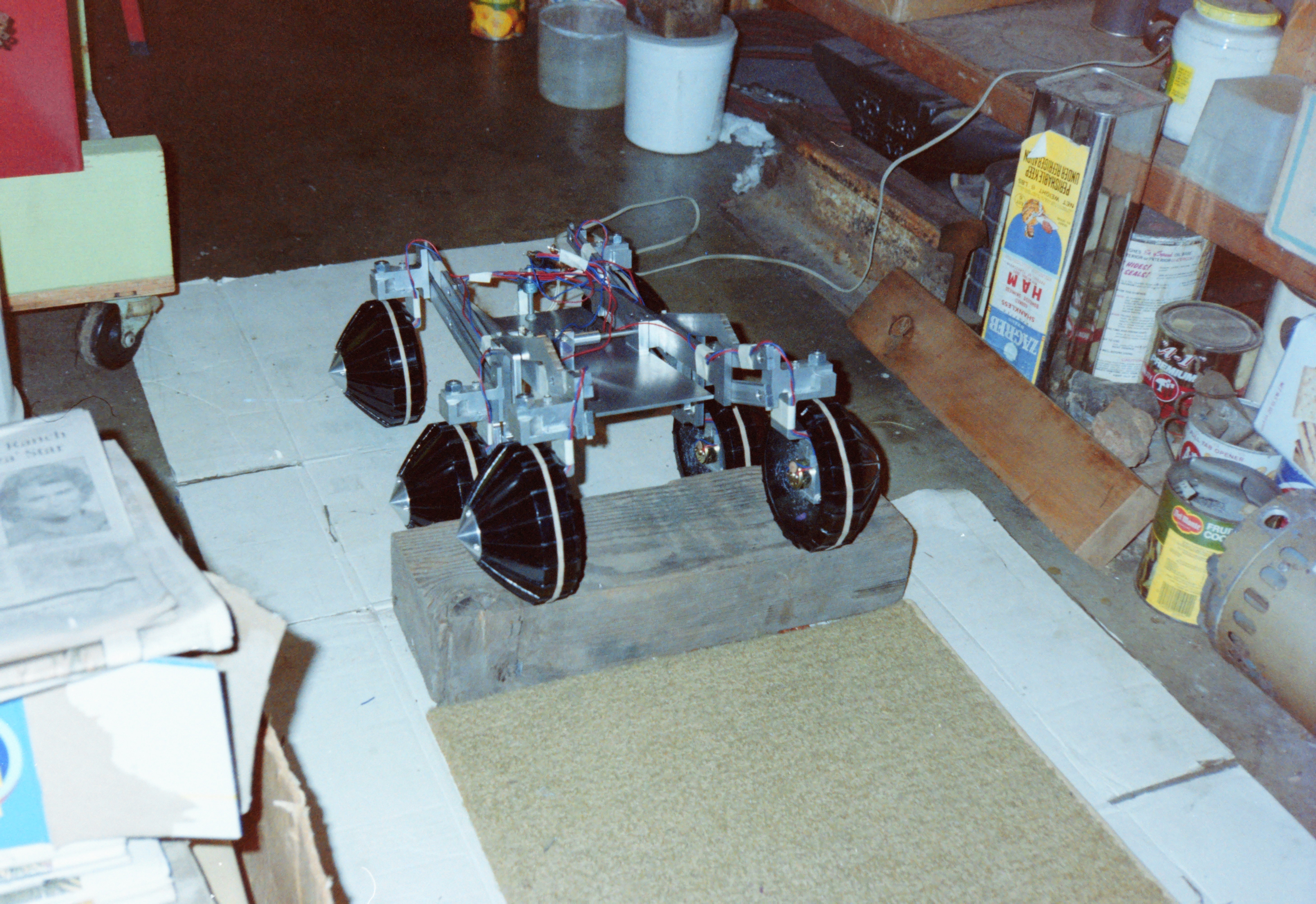
The “Bickler Pantograph”, an early rover prototype, pictured in Bickler's garage.

Bickler subsequently developed a motorized experimental rover sometimes referred to as the “Bickler pantograph”, which used parallel four-bar linkages to achieve high ground clearance and improved obstacle-traversal capability.

Later experimental rovers known as the Rocky series incorporated a rocker-bogie articulation system that retained the mobility advantages of the earlier designs while improving obstacle-climbing performance over previous six-wheel rover concepts developed at JPL.

Bickler’s suspension architecture was formalized in U.S. Patent 4,840,394, Articulated Suspension System, filed in 1987 and issued in 1989.

==== Use on Mars rovers ====
The articulated rocker-bogie suspension was adopted for the rover developed for NASA’s Mars Pathfinder mission. The design was first used for the Sojourner rover in 1997 and later formed the basis of mobility systems used on subsequent Mars rover missions.

Bickler’s work on rover mobility systems continued to shape later Mars missions; in 2012, JPL engineer Jaime Waydo described him as “the father and inventor of Martian mobility”.

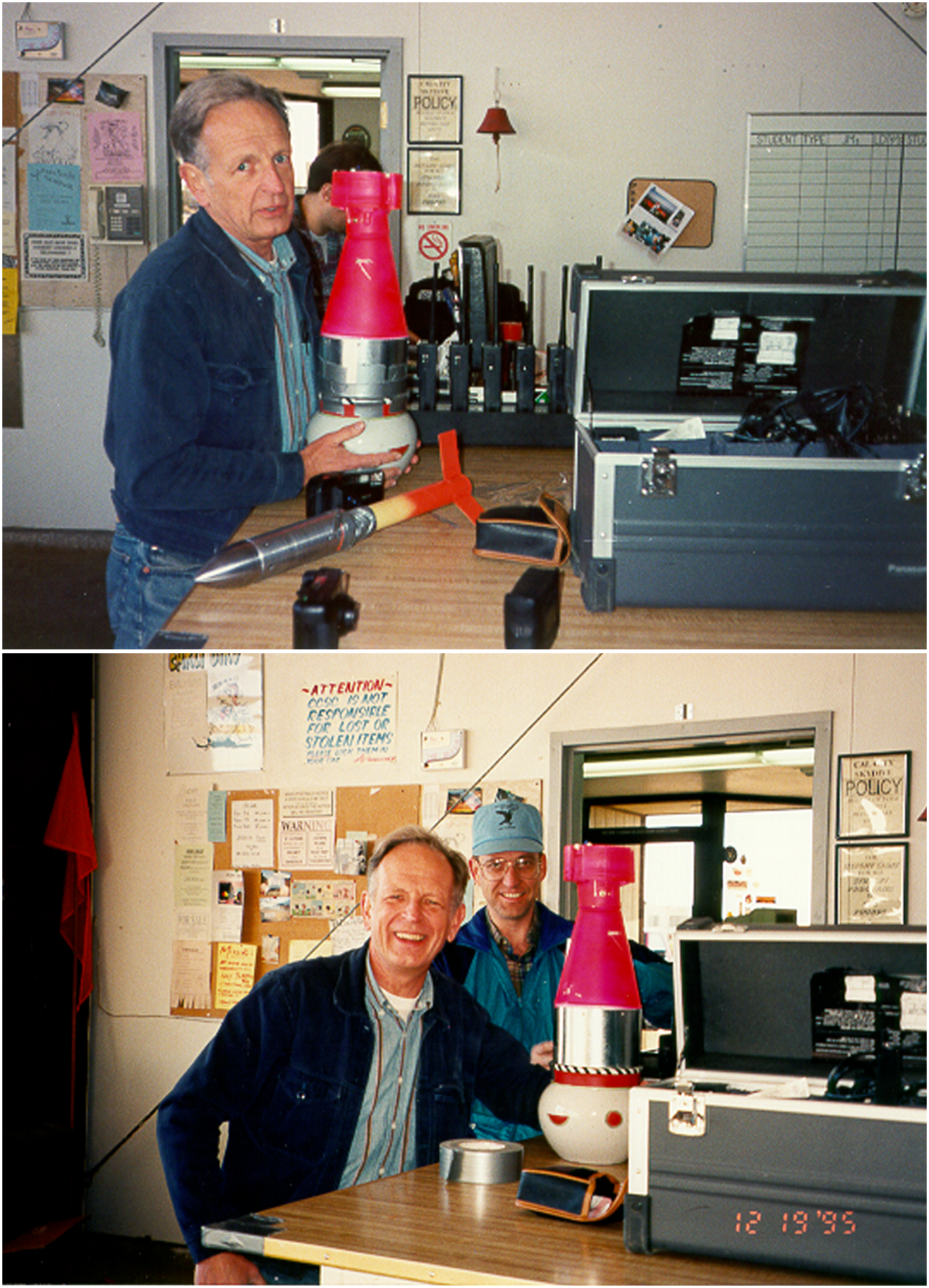
Bickler, preparing for airplane testing of Deep Space 2 probes in 1995

== Other engineering contributions ==
Bickler’s published work also included off-road traction analysis. In 1990 he authored an SAE technical paper describing a method for computing traction forces when all wheels of a vehicle are slipping under eccentric loading conditions.

He also co-authored a NASA Tech Brief describing all-metal tires intended for environments where elastomeric and pneumatic tires would not function (including extreme temperatures).

== Awards and honors ==
- NASA Exceptional Engineering Achievement Medal (1998) for contributions to the Mars Pathfinder rover program.
- Fellow of the American Society of Mechanical Engineers (ASME), elected 2006.
