= Cachecam =

Camera mounted on the Mars 2020 Rover

The Cachecam, a photographic camera, is mounted inside the rover underbelly, at the top of the sample cache of NASA's Perseverance rover mission to Mars.

== Overview ==
The Cachecam's main job is to photograph the top of a sample tube after the sample is gathered in order to verify acquisition before the tube is sealed. It may also take images at other points in the sample processing.

The Cachecam will acquire color images of the samples using its 20 megapixel CMOS detector.

It is considered an engineering camera. The other sets of engineering cameras on the Mars 2020 Rover are the Navcams and hazcams.

== See also ==
- Astrionics
- List of NASA cameras on spacecraft
- Mars rover
