= Nikon NASA F4 =

1989 digital single-lens reflex camera

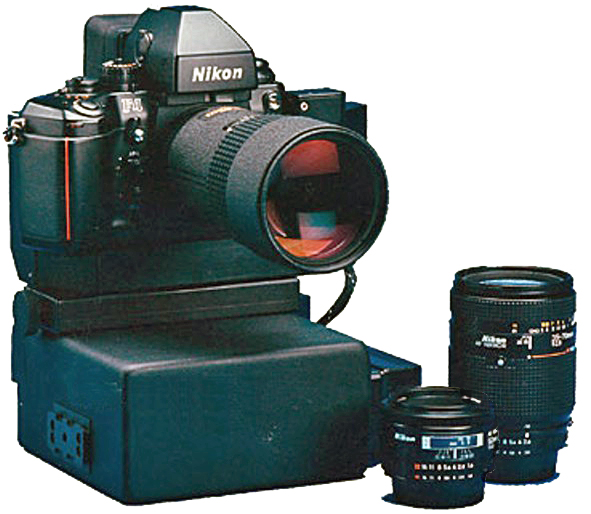
Nikon NASA F4 front view with DA-20 action finder, Electronics Box and lenses.

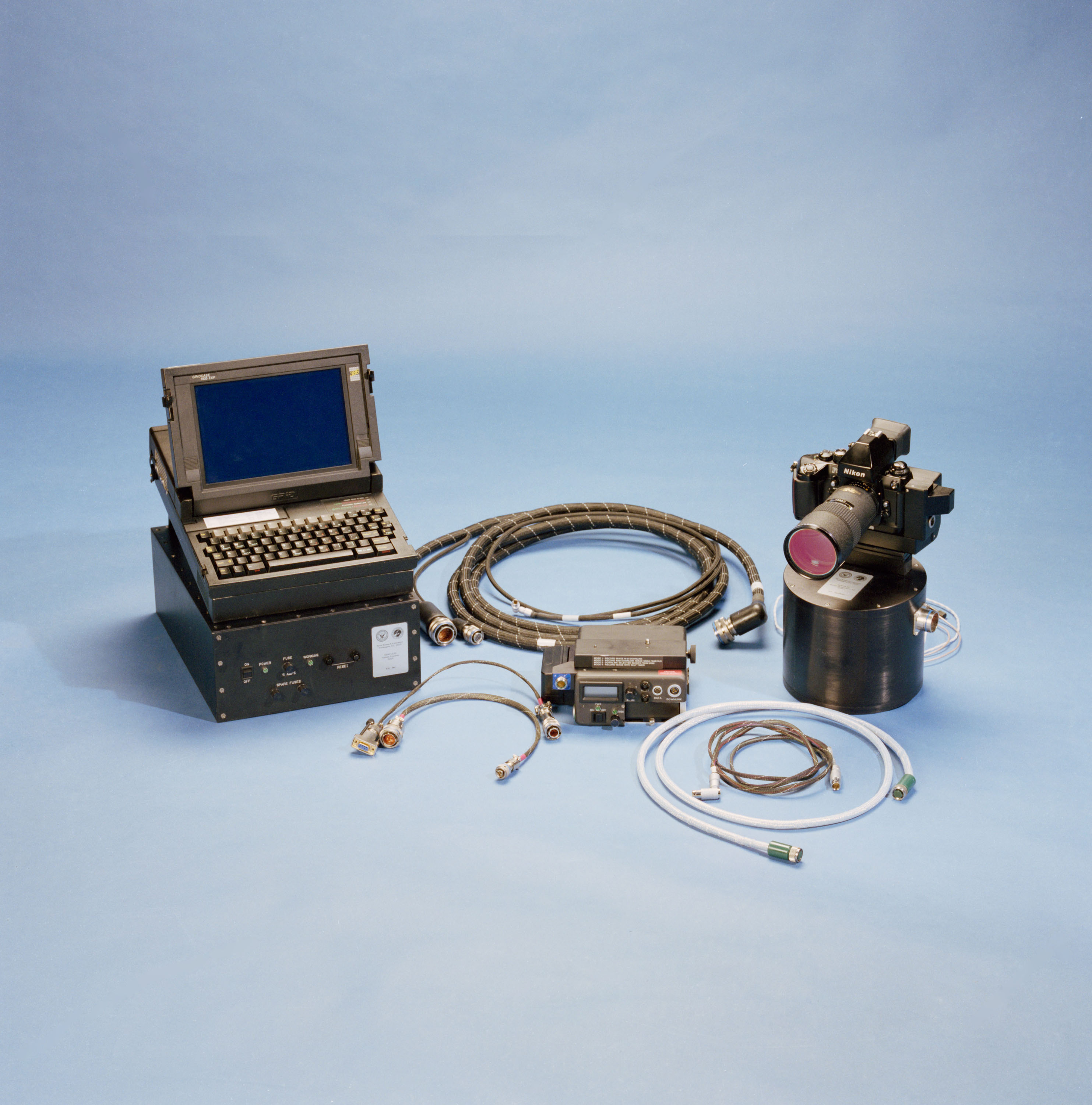
Nikon NASA F4 together with HERCULES measurement and ring laser gyroscope right, its Electronics Box in the center and the laptop mounted atop the HERCULES Playback-Downlink Unit and Attitude Processor left.

The Nikon NASA F4 Electronic Still Camera is one of the first and rarest fully digital cameras, with development started in 1987. While Nikon delivered a modified Nikon F4 body, most of the electronics for the digital camera and housings were designed and manufactured by NASA at the Johnson Space Center and other suppliers. It was first flown in September 1991 on board the Space Shuttle Discovery, mission STS-48. Later, the cameras were flown on several other Shuttle missions including STS-44, 45, 42, 49, 53, 56 and 61.

Although the camera was often used alone mounted with its Electronics Box, the HERCULES system was built around it: Hand-held Earth-oriented Real-time Cooperative, User-friendly, Location, targeting, and Environmental System. It includes one of the first laptops in space mounted atop the Playback-Downlink Unit (PDU) and the kit also included the HERCULES Attitude Processor (HAP, a gyroscope based geolocation processor with initialization through star alignment shot with Nikon NASA F4 and additionally GPS data, giving up to 0.005 degrees per hour precision), Electronic Still Camera (ESC) Electronics Box (ESCEB) including removable imagery data storage disks, NRL HERCULES Inertial Measurement Unit (HIMU) with the three-axis Honeywell ring laser gyroscope, DA-20 action finder, a night vision image intensifier as well as assorted lenses and cables. It was flown on the STS-53 and 56 missions and was succeeded by the HERCULES-B.

== History ==
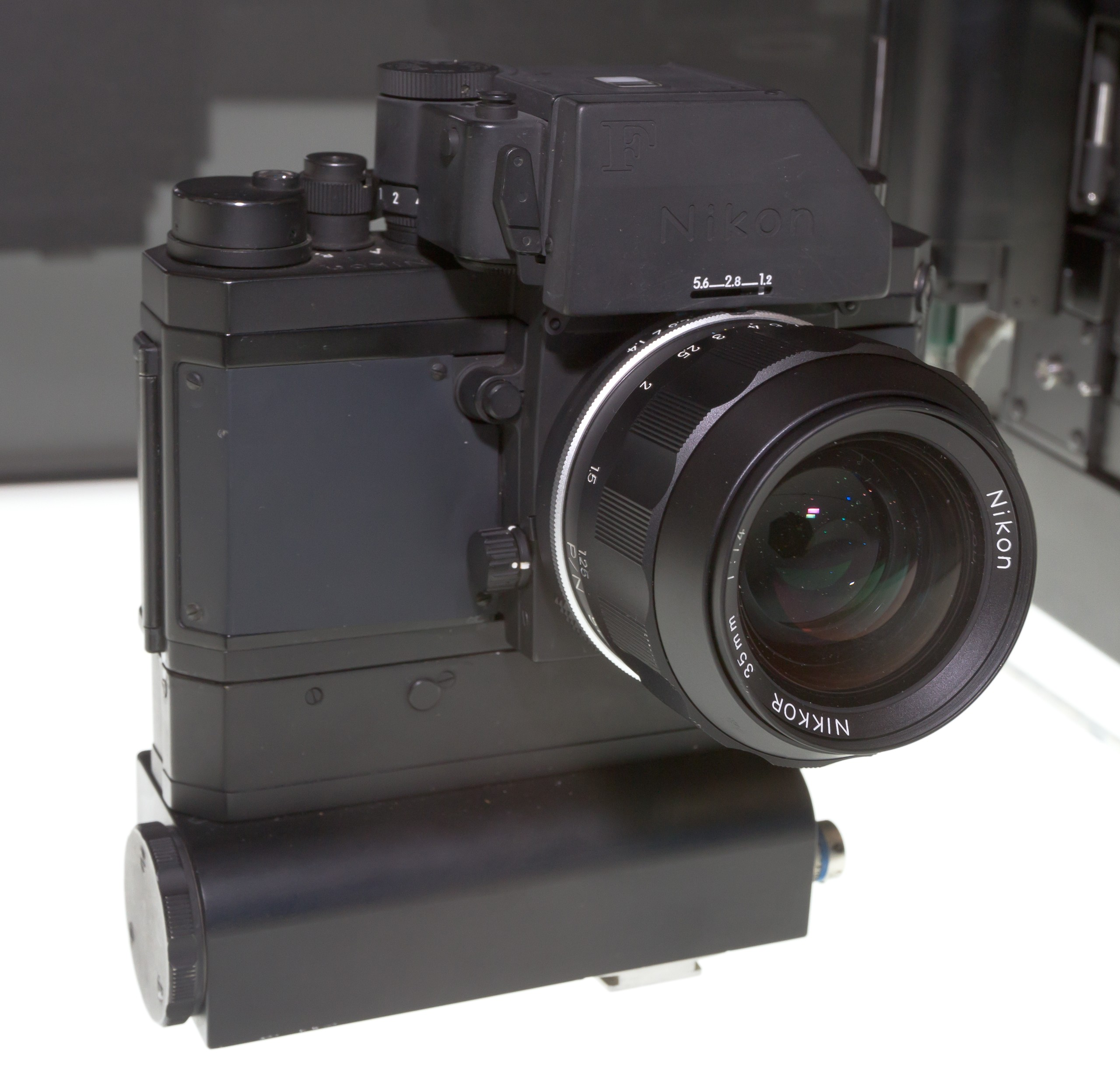
Apollo 15 (NASA) Nikon F with FTn Photomic prism and motor drive, usable for extra-vehicular activity. The first 35 mm SLR in lunar orbit.

Nikon has been a supplier of space (EVA) capable cameras for NASA since 1971, when they delivered a modified Nikon F SLR Photomic FTn camera with center-weighted TTL metering system, which was first used on the Apollo 15 mission. In 1973, a newer modified version of the Nikon F with a motor drive was delivered for use in Skylab. In 1980 and 1989, Nikon delivered modified, space capable F3 (big and small version) respectively F4 cameras to NASA, which were used in the Space Shuttle.

Nikon's first digital camera (still video camera, with analog storage) was the Nikon Still Video Camera (SVC) Model 1, a prototype which was first presented at Photokina 1986. This was followed in 1988 by the Nikon QV-1000C Still Video Camera, which was produced mainly for professional press use. Both cameras used QV mount lenses, a variant of Nikon F-mount lenses. Via a mount adapter (QM-100), F-mount lenses can be used.

The NASA Electronic Still Camera / Nikon NASA F4 was followed by the NASA-used Nikon-based Kodak DCS 460, DCS 660 and DCS 760, Nikon D1, D2X, D2Xs, D3, D3X, D3S, D4, D800E, D5, D6, and, more recently, Z9. The Nikon F-mount is the only 35mm SLR or DSLR lens mount ever used by NASA.

With the advent of the Nikon Z-Mount, the Z-mount cameras are the successors with integrated FTP (File Transfer Protocol), reduced power consumption and other changes compared to the commercial cameras. The Nikon Z9 for the Artemis IV mission to the moon is named Handheld Universal Lunar Camera, and is additionally modified to withstand the high radiation levels in space and is protected by a new thermal blanket.

== Technology ==
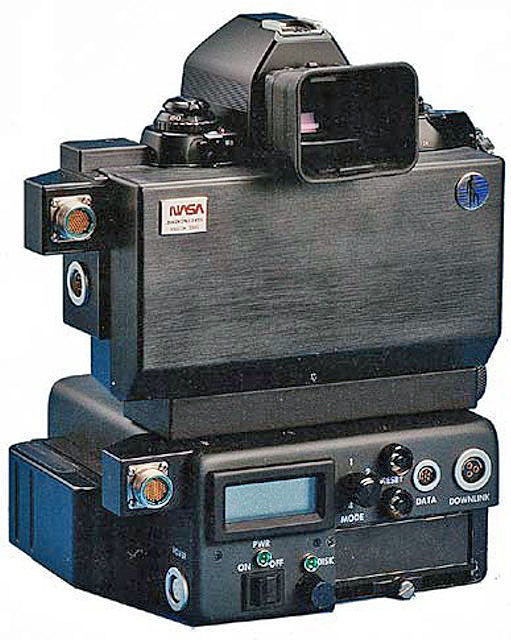
Nikon NASA F4 back view with DA-20 action finder and Electronics Box.

The camera was based on a modified F4 with standard F-mount and had a digital camera back with a monochrome CCD image sensor with 1024 x 1024 pixels on an area of 15 x 15mm developed by Ford Aerospace: type FA1024L. ISO 200 was the only light sensitivity, without infrared filter ISO 400. Removable IDE hard-disks were used for digital storage of 40 images each with 8 bits per pixel (256 gray levels). The camera's imaging sensor interface was based on an Altera Stand Alone Microsequencer and employed a 1 image SRAM storage buffer. The removable hard drive, RS-232 interface, LCD, Ku-Band downlink interface and remaining camera control were accomplished with a Wildcard 88 (Intel 80C88 8 MHz CPU) single-board computer. Images were transmitted to the ground via the Orbiter Ku-Band digital downlink at a rate of 2 Mbit/s. Within 1 hour the images were processed at Johnson Space Center's Pixar Image Computer and laser printed with a 3M Color Laser Imager.

Three copies of the NASA Electronic Still Camera were produced. The original development team included NASA Civil Servant electronic and mechanical design and fabrication, Lockheed development of the Electronic Still Camera ground station, Nikon Engineering supplying in total 14 modified Nikon F4 camera bodies also for prototypes, and Ford Aerospace and JPL development of the CCD image sensor.

Developed upgrades included a 2048 x 2048 CCD sensor, a color CCD and architecture changes, but finally the Kodak DCS 460 was preferred.

== See also ==
- Nikon E series
- List of cameras on ISS
- List of NASA cameras on spacecraft

Sensor	Class	1999	2000	2001	2002	2003	2004	2005	2006	2007	2008	2009	2010	2011	2012	2013	2014	2015	2016	2017	2018	2019	2020	2021	2022	2023	2024	2025	2026
FX (Full-frame)	Flagship											D3X ^{−P}																	
FX (Full-frame)	Flagship										D3 ^{−P}		D3S ^{−P}		D4		D4S		D5^{T}					D6^{T}					
FX (Full-frame)	Professional											D700 ^{−P}			D800/D800E			D810/D810A			D850 ^{AT}								
FX (Full-frame)	Enthusiast																Df												
FX (Full-frame)	Enthusiast																	D750 ^{A}					D780 ^{AT}						
FX (Full-frame)	Enthusiast															D600	D610												
DX (APS-C)	Flagship		D1^{−E}	D1X^{−E}				D2X^{−E}		D2Xs^{−E}																			
DX (APS-C)	Flagship		D1^{−E}	D1H ^{−E}			D2H^{−E}	D2Hs^{−E}																					
DX (APS-C)	Professional				D100^{−E}				D200^{−E}		D300^{−P}		D300S^{−P}						D500 ^{AT}										
DX (APS-C)	Enthusiast						D70^{−E}		D70s^{−E}	D80^{−E}		D90^{−E}		D7000 ^{−P}			D7100	D7200			D7500 ^{AT}								
DX (APS-C)	Upper-entry								D50^{−E}	D40X^{−E*}	D60^{−E*}		D5000^{A−P*}		D5100^{A−P*}	D5200^{A−P*}	D5300^{A*}	D5500^{AT*}		D5600 ^{AT*}									
DX (APS-C)	Entry-level									D40^{−E*}			D3000^{−E*}	D3100^{−P*}		D3200^{−P*}	D3300^{*}			D3400^{*}		D3500^{*}							
Early models		SVC (prototype; 1986); QV-1000C (1988); NASA F4 (1991); E2/E2S (1995); E2N/E2NS (1996); E3/E3S (1998)																											
Sensor	Class																												
Sensor	Class	1999	2000	2001	2002	2003	2004	2005	2006	2007	2008	2009	2010	2011	2012	2013	2014	2015	2016	2017	2018	2019	2020	2021	2022	2023	2024	2025	2026
