= Horizon scanning (disambiguation) =

Horizon scanning may refer to:

- Literally horizon scanning performed by technical devices like infrared horizon-scanning
- Horizon scanning, a method from futures studies
- Horizon scanning, a former alternative name for environmental scanning
