= Marsokhod =

Proposed Russian Mars rover

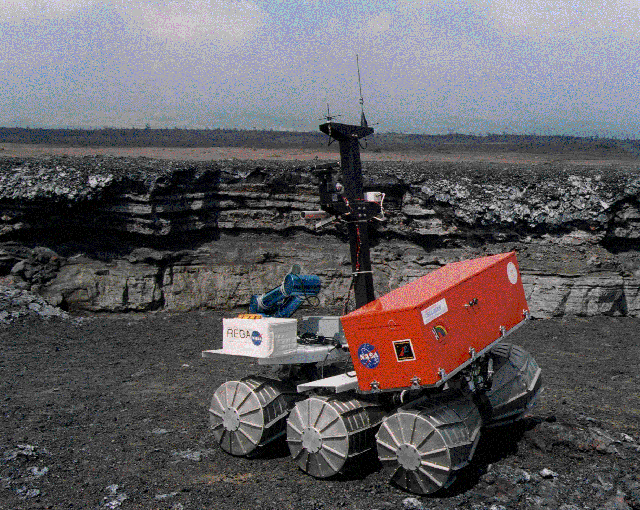
- Country of origin: Russia
- Operator: Roscosmos

Specifications
- Spacecraft type: Mars rover

Production
- Retired: 1996

Marsokhod (Russian: Марсоход, lit. 'Mars rover') is a Russian Mars rover project that was intended for use in the Mars-96 mission. Instead it was used for experiments into improving rover technology.

== History ==
Prototypes of the Marsokhod rover were taken from Russia to the NASA Ames Research Center, where they were jointly developed by the US and Russia. This led to the development of a 'virtual environment control system', which meant the rover could be controlled remotely via an interface on a PC.

Since the development of this control interface the rover has been deployed in simulations. These experiments provide insight for robotics researchers and scientists preparing for planetary surface exploration.

Marsokhod during the tests in Ames Research Center, 1996

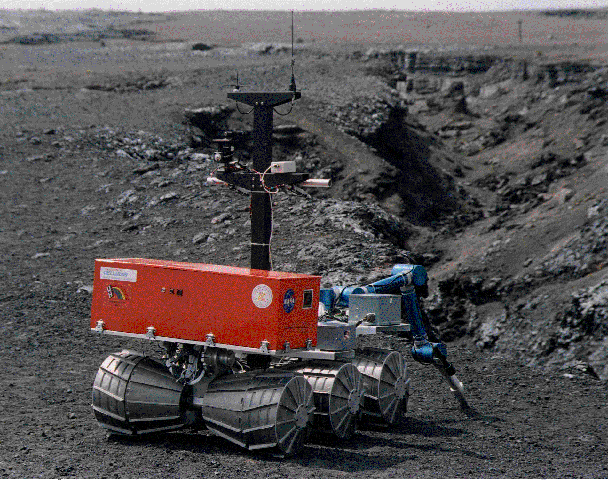

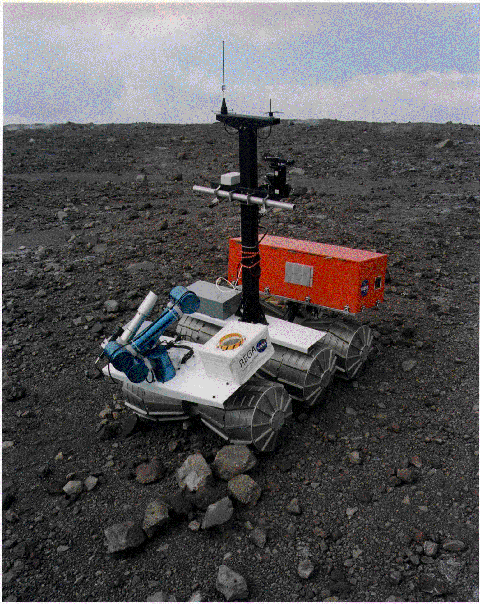

== Links ==
- Interview with Carol Stoker from Planetary Systems Branch
- Marsokhod Desert Southwest Field Test
- Marsokhod: Autonomous navigation tests on a Mars-like terrain
- Small Marsokhod configuration
