= Pancam =

Electronic stereo cameras on Spirit and Opportunity Mars rovers

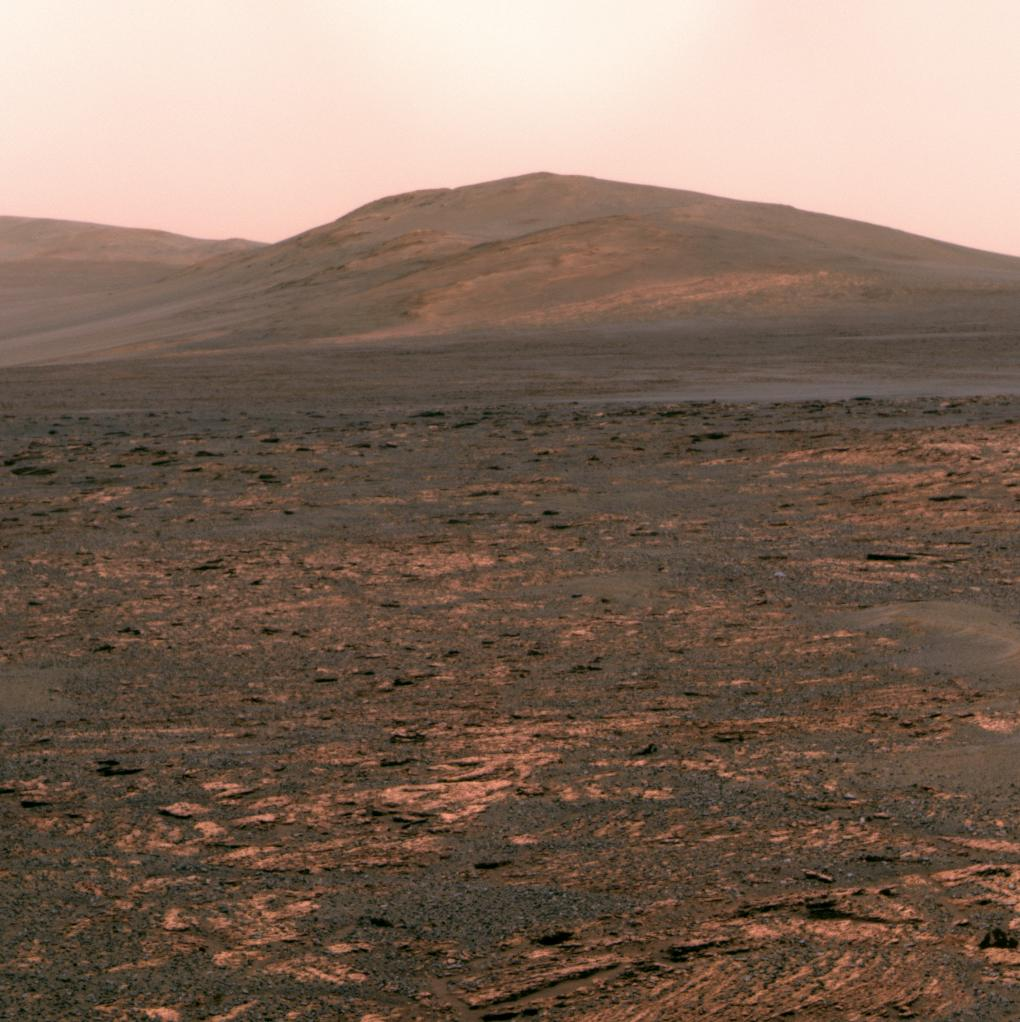
753, 535, and 432 nanometers light wavelengths (e.g. approximately true color) of Solander point as seen overlooking Botany bay.

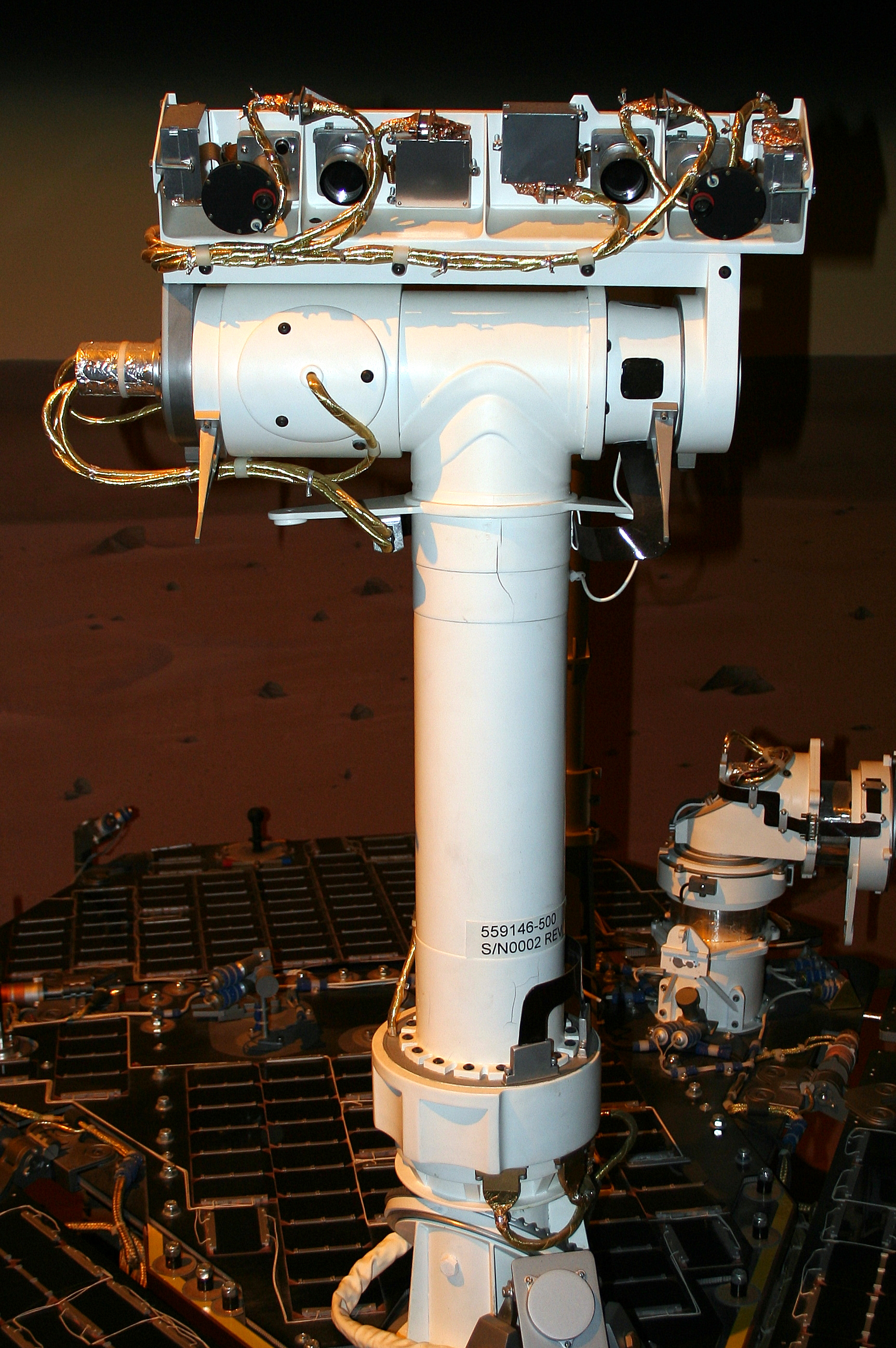
Pancam Mast Assembly (PMA)

Each Pancam is one of two electronic stereo cameras on Mars Exploration Rovers Spirit and Opportunity. It has a filter wheel assembly that enables it to view different wavelengths of light and the pair of Pancams are mounted beside two NavCams on the MER camera bar assembly.

According to Cornell University it can work with Mini-TES to analyze surroundings.

According to a paper about Mars by JPL, the Pancam system can achieve an angular resolution of 300 microradians, which is three times better than the human eye. It can observe 14 spectral bands, and with two side-by side cameras can generate stereoscopic views of Mars, supporting the creation of large Mars panoramas in excess of 10 Gbit uncompressed. Spirit rover took the highest resolution image ever taken on the surface of another planet up to that time when it landed in 2004.

== Optics ==
The focal length of the camera is 43 mm with a field of view (FOV) of 16° x 16°. The two cameras are separated by 30 cm and are mounted upside-down relative to each other.

== Charge-Coupled Device ==
A 1024 x 2048 frame transfer Charge-Coupled Device (CCD) detector built by Mitel is used for both cameras. The CCD is front-side illuminated and does not use any anti-reflex or UV-enhancing coatings. Half of the chip is used for storage and readout and is therefore shielded from illumination.

== Electronics ==
An Actel Field Programmable Gate Array (FPGA) RT1280 provides the necessary computational abilities for the camera. The signal of the CCD is transformed into a 12-bit digital signal before data processing.

== Filter wheel ==
The left camera has filters with the following wavelength: (739, 753, 673, 601, 535, 482, 432, 440 nm), while the right camera has the filters for:(436, 754, 803, 864, 904, 934, 1009, 880 nm). Each filter wheel is driven by a stepper motor to provide rotation of the wheel.

== Calibration target ==
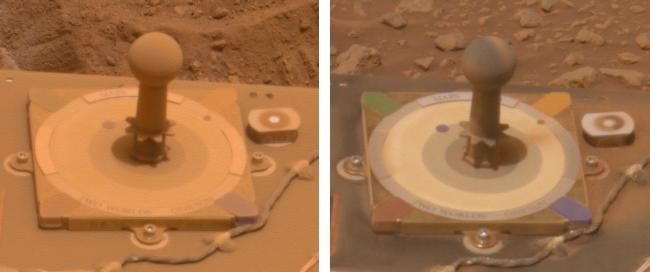
Pancam operators attempted human eye color in these two pictures of the MER MarsDial taken 10 days apart. Dust-clearing winds reduced the amount of dust in the right-side image. The images were produced with light from 430 nanometer to 750 nm wavelengths.

The calibration target on the rover is also part of the camera system and contains several areas. Polished areas to reflect the Martian sky, areas with known reflectivity and at the four corners color targets made from silicone. The inorganic pigments for the corners were hematite, goethite, chromium oxide and cobalt aluminate. The calibration target is part of the sundial assembly.

== See also ==
- Astrionics
- Comparison of embedded computer systems on board the Mars rovers
- Curiosity rover
- Hazcam
- List of NASA cameras on spacecraft
- Mars
- Navcam
