= Hazcam =

Camera used by extraterrestrial rover missions to avoid hazards

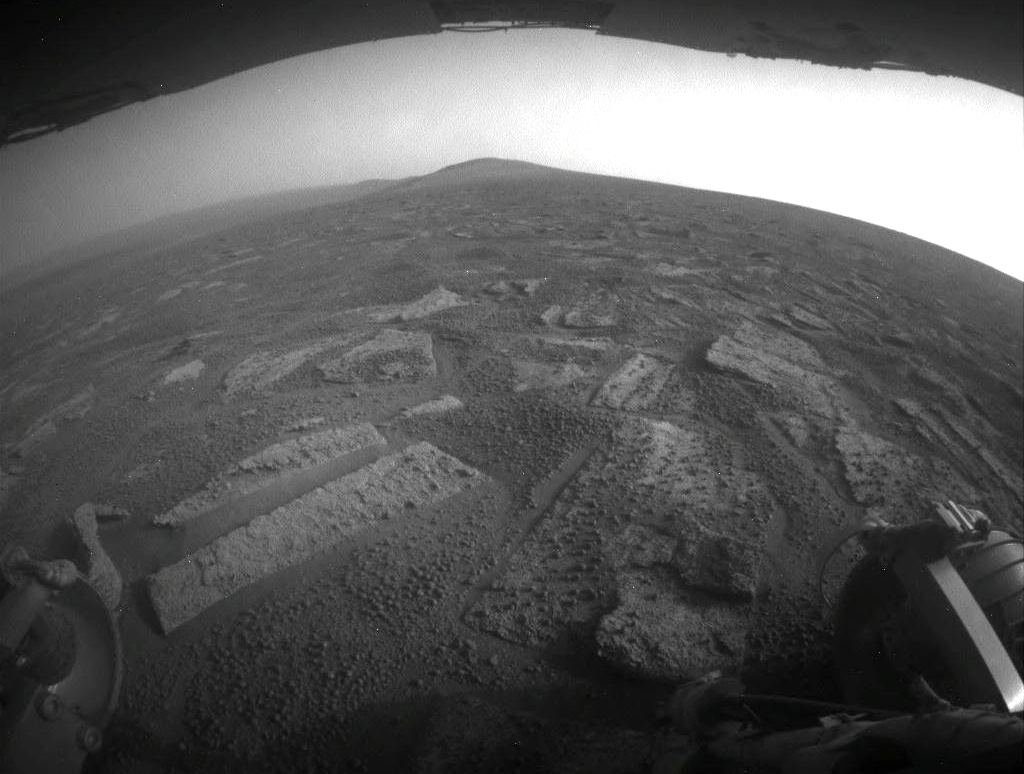
Hazcam image of Botany Bay and Solander Point (2013)

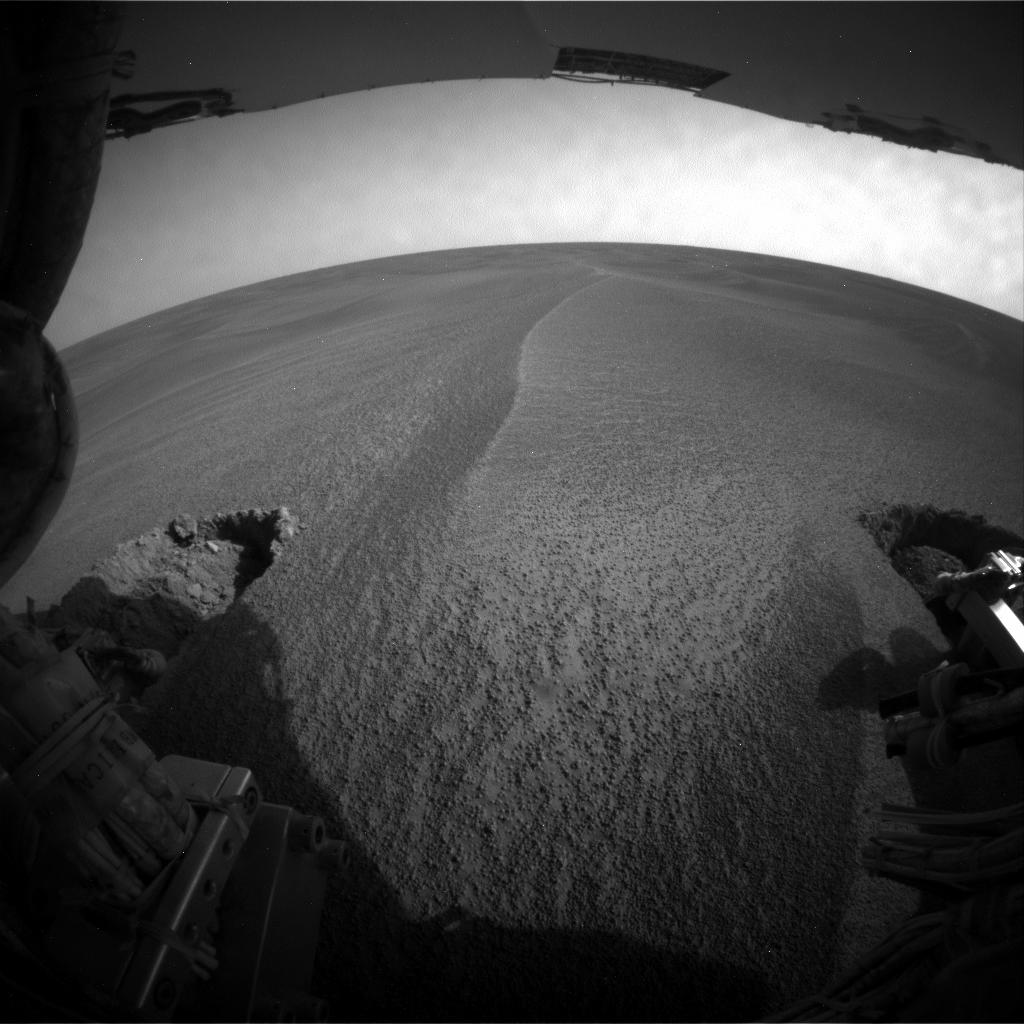
Hazcam images indicated to NASA engineers that the Opportunity rover was stuck in a sand dune.

Hazcams (short for hazard avoidance cameras) are photographic cameras mounted on the front and rear of NASA's Spirit, Opportunity, Curiosity and Perseverance rover missions to Mars and on the lower front portion of the Chinese Yutu rover mission to the Moon and the Zhurong rover to Mars.

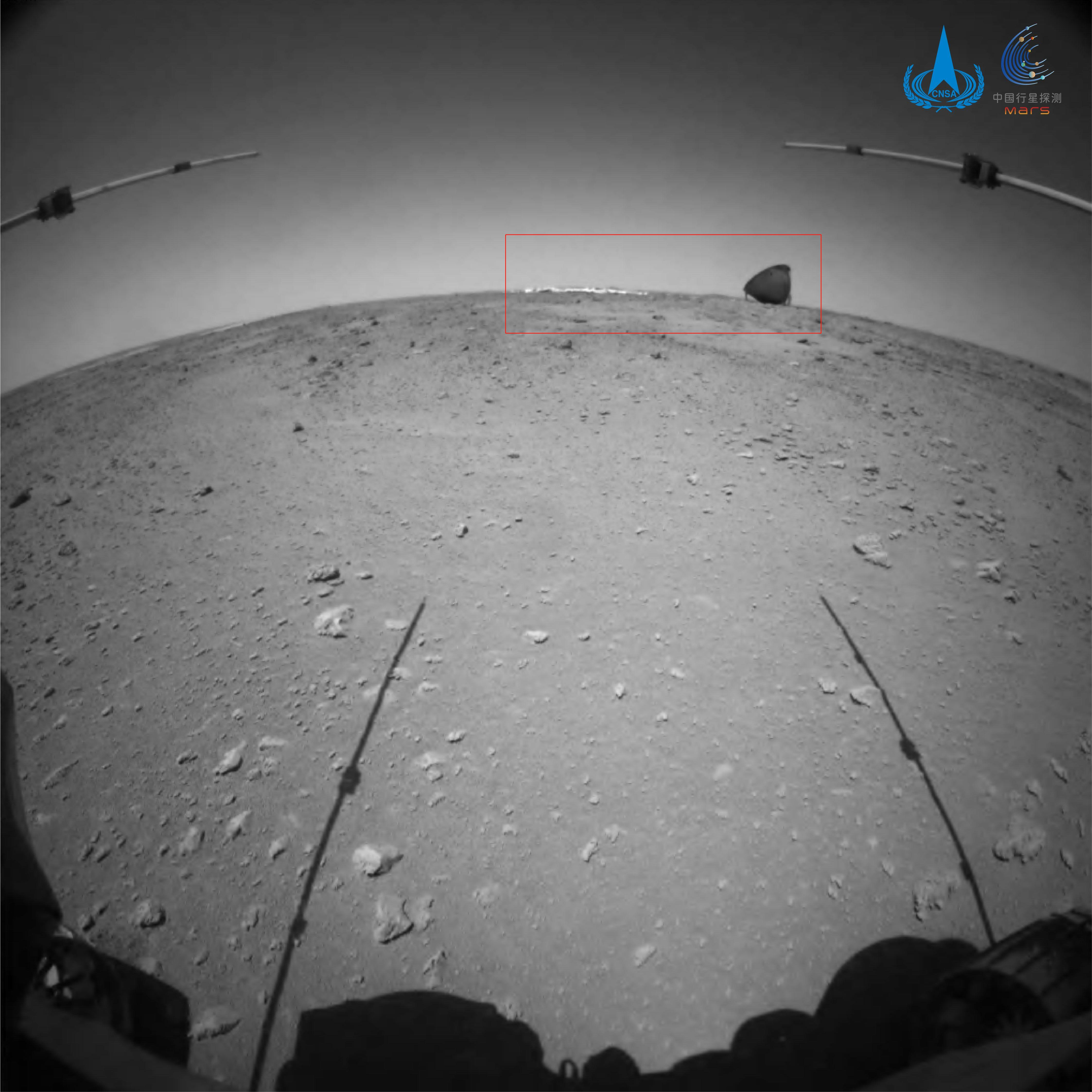
An image depicting the backshell of the CNSA Tianwen-1 Mars rover Zhurong, seen here from the rear HazCam mounted on the rover's back.

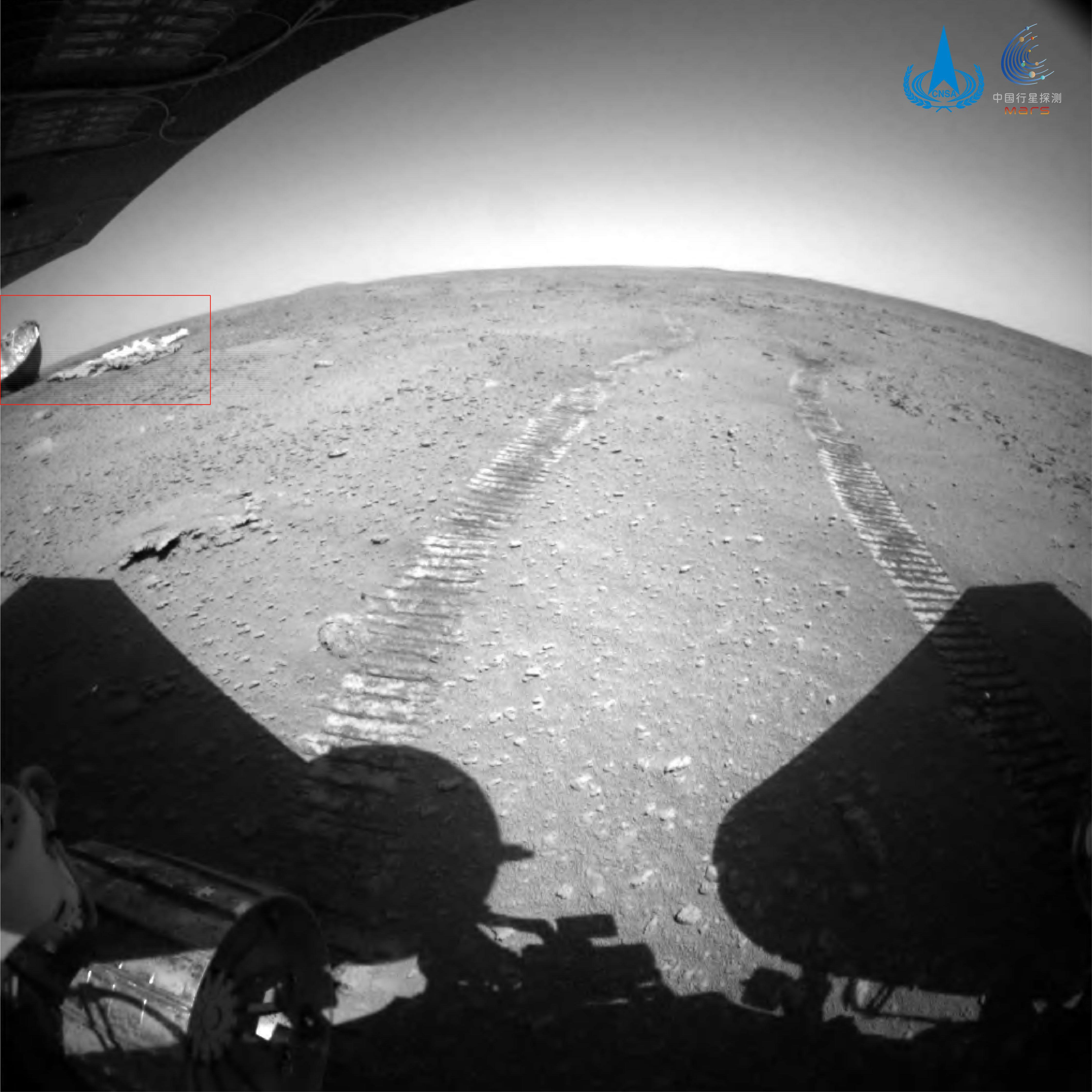
An image depicting the backshell of the CNSA Tianwen-1 Mars rover Zhurong, seen here from the front HazCam mounted on the rover's front.

== Overview ==
The Curiosity rover's hazcams are sensitive to visible light and return black and white images of resolution 1024 × 1024 pixels. These images are used by the rovers' internal computer to autonomously navigate around hazards. Due to their positioning on both sides of the rovers, simultaneous images taken by either both front or both rear cameras can be used to produce a 3D map of the immediate surroundings. As the cameras are fixed (i.e. can not move independently of the rover), they have a wide field of view (approximately 120° both horizontally and vertically) to allow a large amount of terrain to be visible.

They are considered engineering cameras since they were not designed to be used for scientific experiments. The other set of engineering cameras on the rovers are the navcams.

The safe landing of the Mars Science Laboratory was initially confirmed using the vehicle's hazcams.

The Perseverance cameras are qualified to operate in temperatures at the poles of Mars and image correctly over a 100 °C (212 °F) temperature range.

== See also ==
- Astrionics
- List of NASA cameras on spacecraft
- Mars rover
- Navigation Camera (Navcam)
- Panoramic Camera (Pancam)
