= Navcam =

Navigational cameras for robotic spacecraft

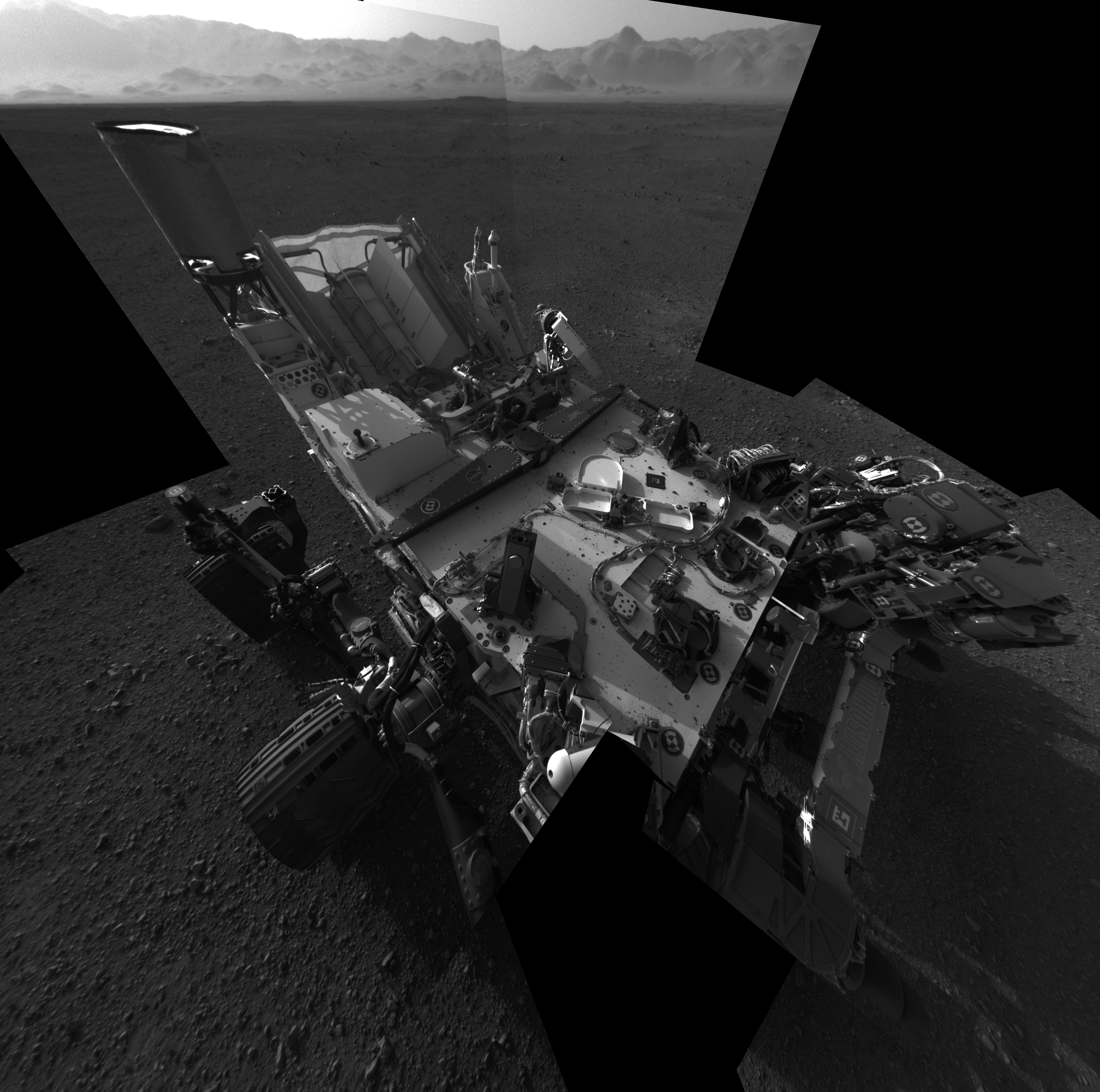
Curiosity's self-portrait shows the deck of the rover as viewed from the NavCams.

Navcam, short for navigational camera, is a type of camera found on certain robotic rovers or spacecraft used for navigation without interfering with scientific instruments. Navcams typically take wide angle photographs that are used to plan the next moves of the vehicle or object tracking.

== Overview ==
The Mars Curiosity rover has two pairs of black and white navigation cameras mounted on the mast to support ground navigation. The cameras have a 45 degree angle of view and use visible light to capture stereoscopic 3D imagery. These cameras, like those on the Mars Pathfinder missions support use of the ICER image compression format.

European Space Agency Rosetta spacecraft used a single camera with 5-degree field of view and 12 bit 1024x1024px resolution allowing for visual tracking on each of spacecraft approaches to the asteroids and finally the comet.

== Gallery ==
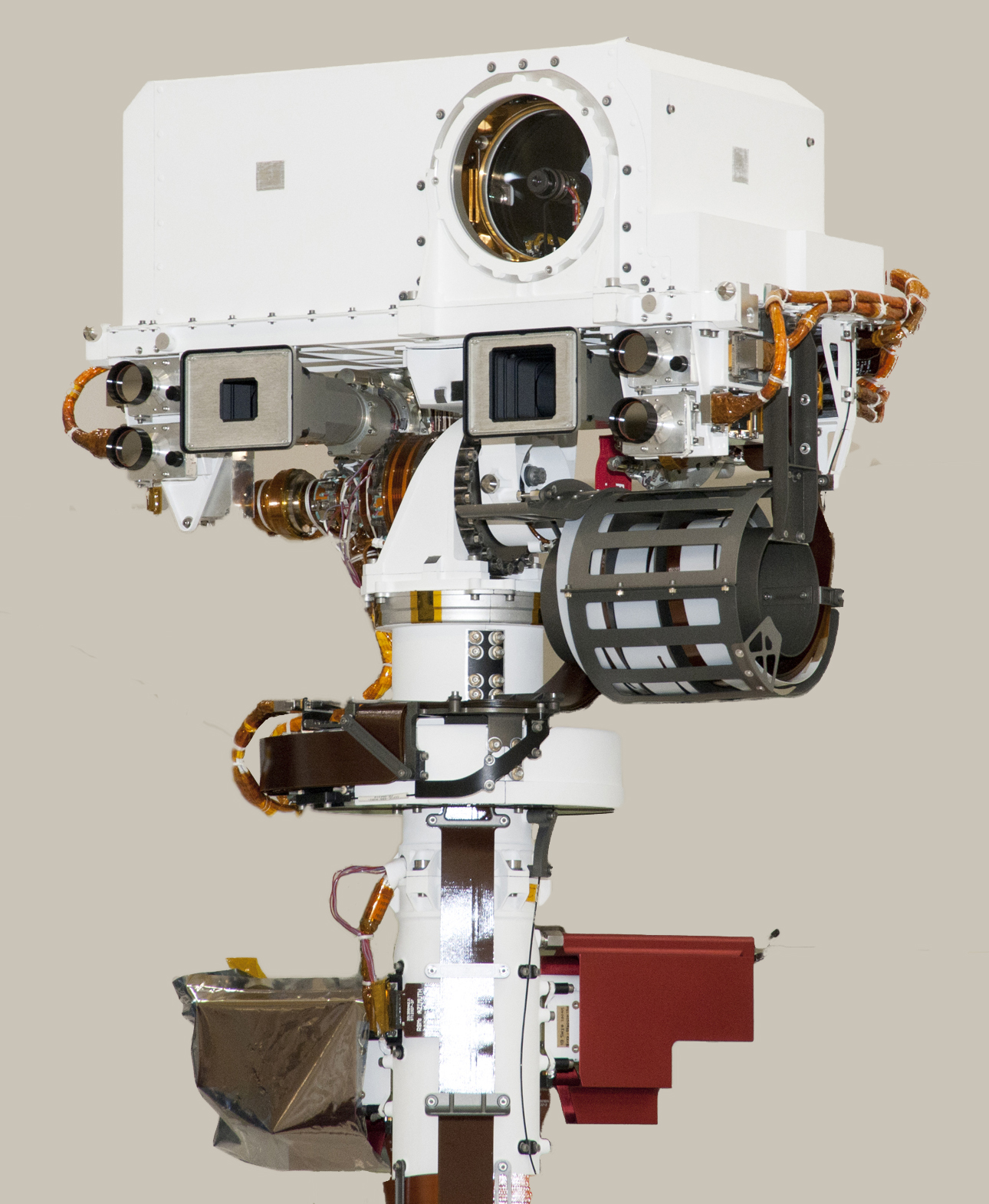
Curiosity rover's mast with two navcams

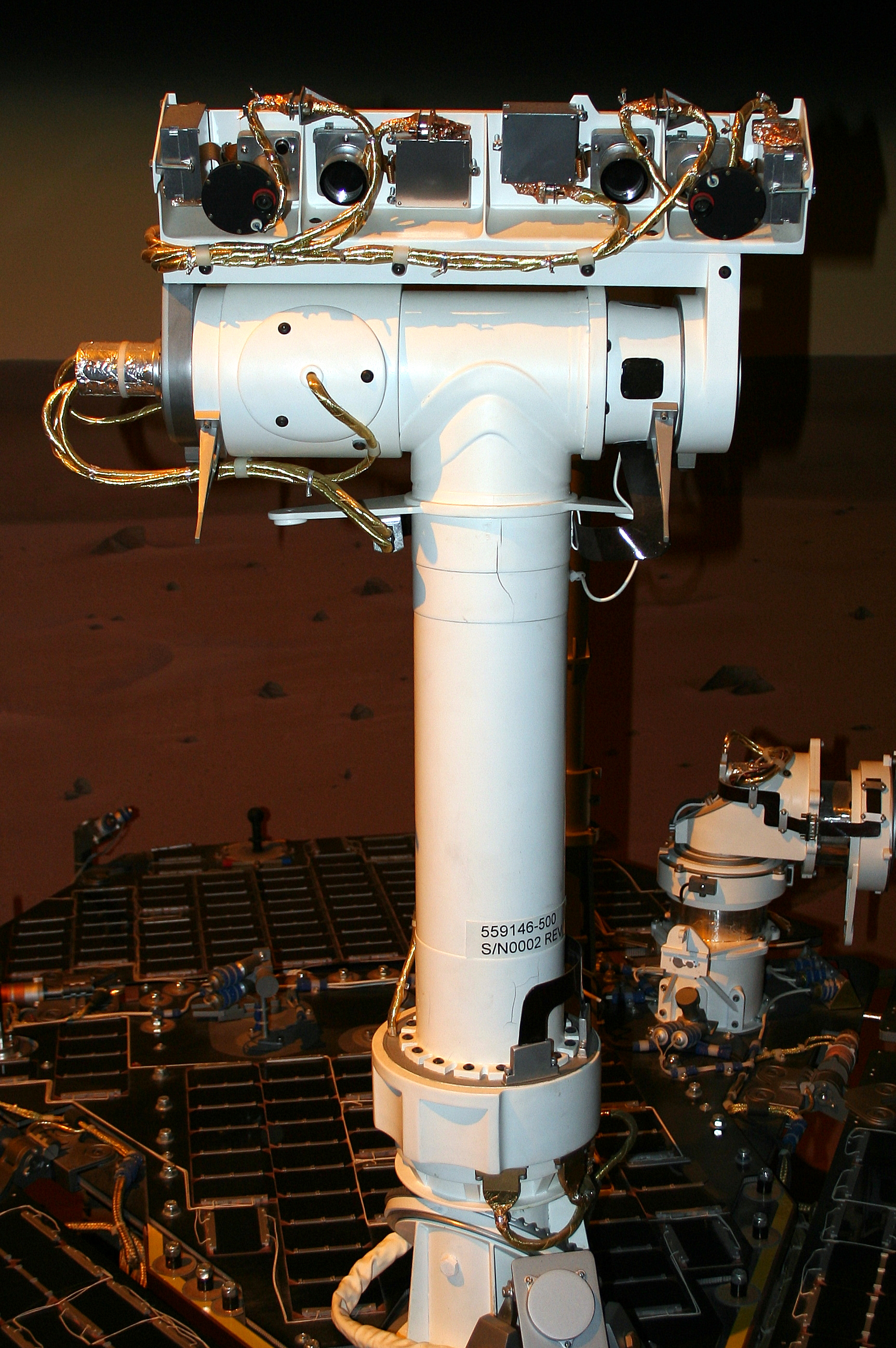
Mars Exploration Rover's mast with two Pancams (on its sides) and two navcams

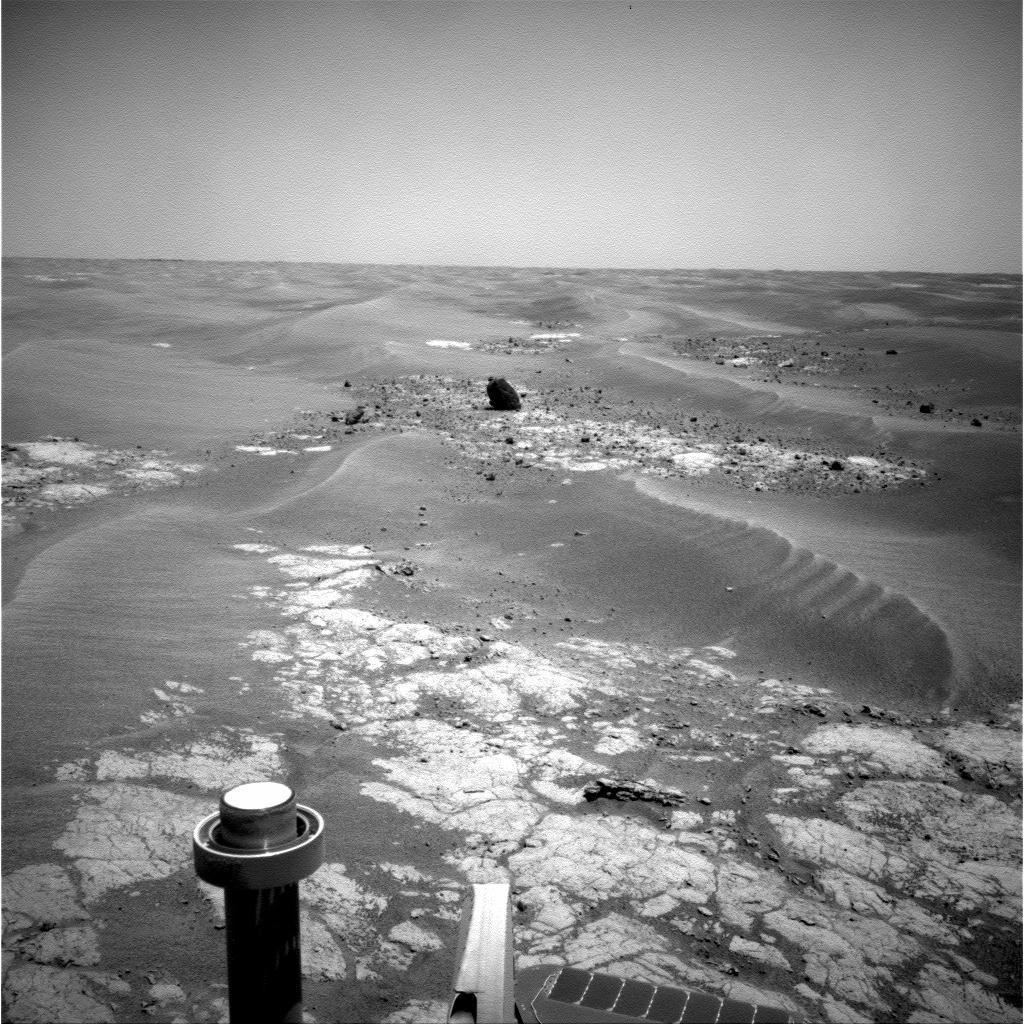
Example of photo made by Opportunity's navcam

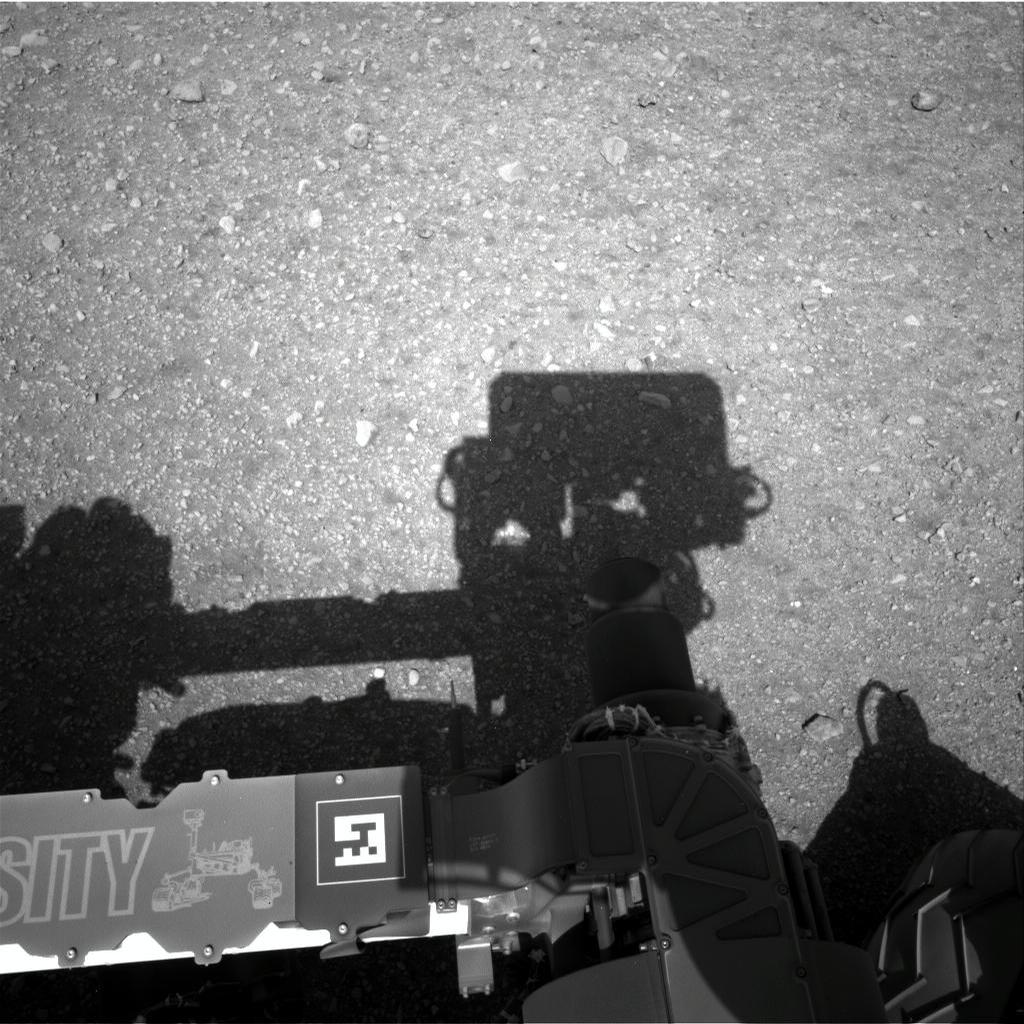
First photo made by Curiosity's navcam

== See also ==
- Astrionics
- Hazard avoidance camera (Hazcam)
- Panoramic camera (Pancam)
- Optical, Spectroscopic, and Infrared camera OSIRIS
- List of NASA cameras on spacecraft
- Mars rover
