= List of NASA cameras on spacecraft =

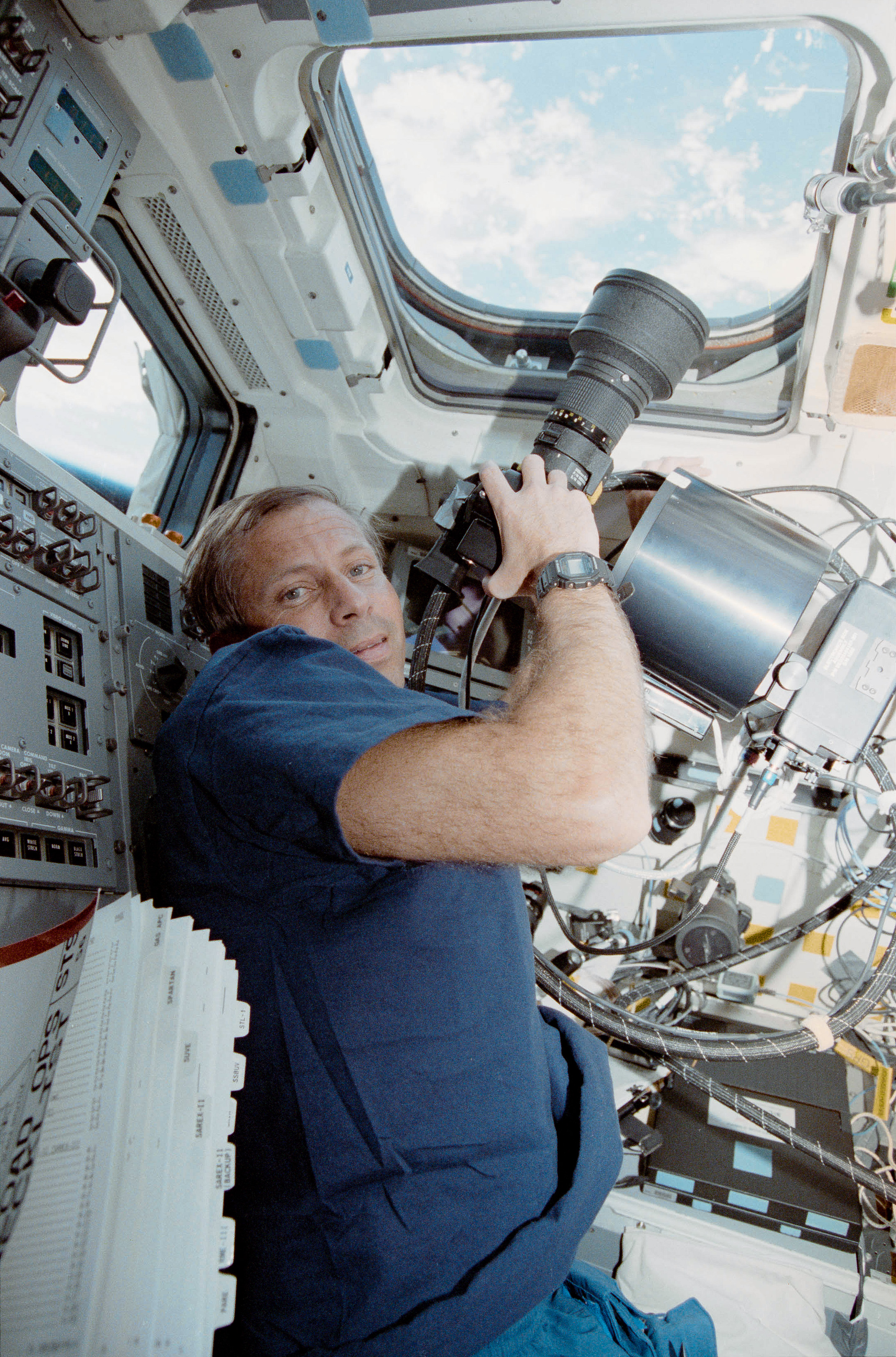
Space Shuttle astronaut Kenneth Cockrell with a digital Nikon NASA F4 HERCULES

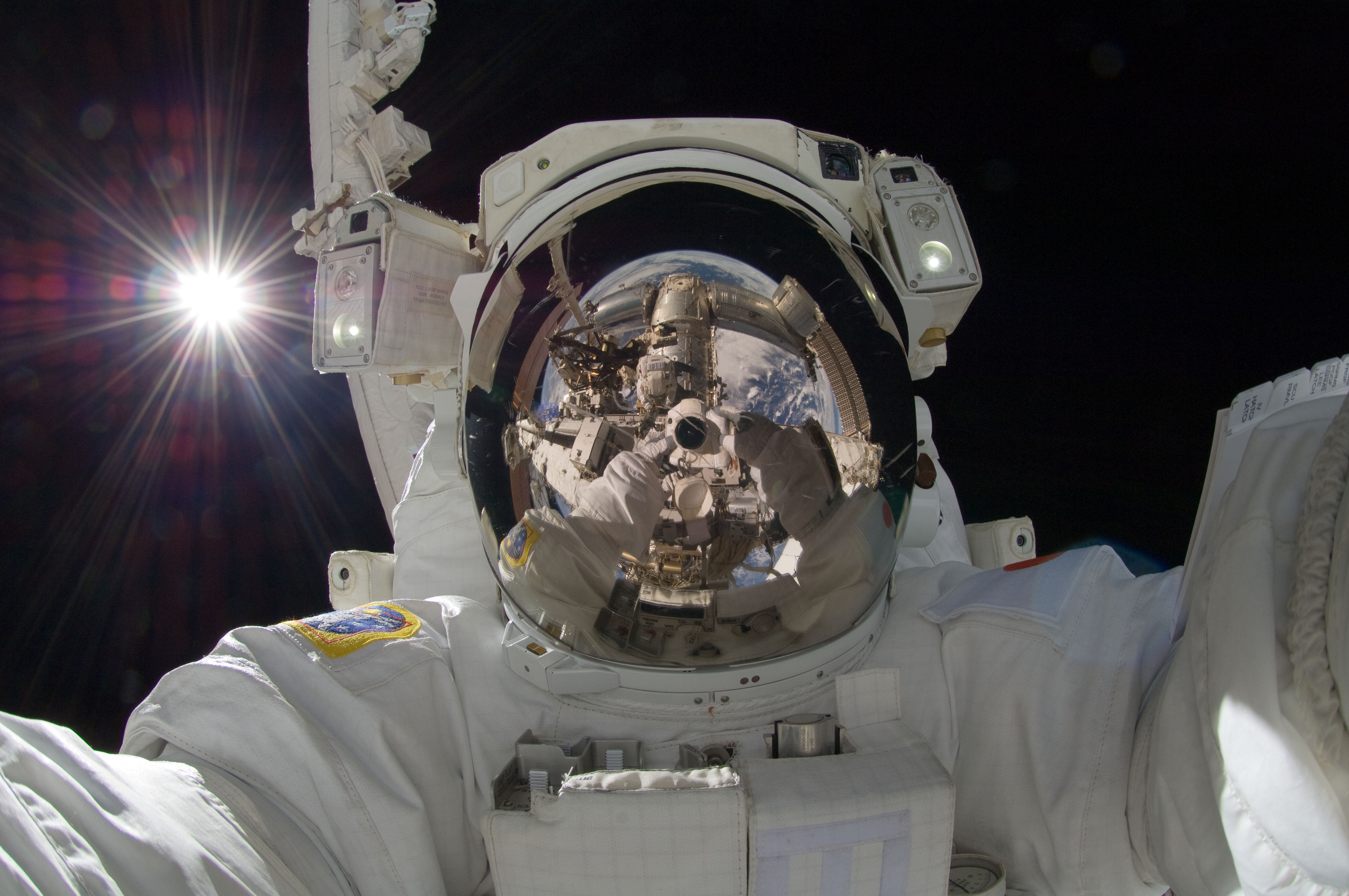
Reflected in the visor is the camera used for this astronaut "selfie"

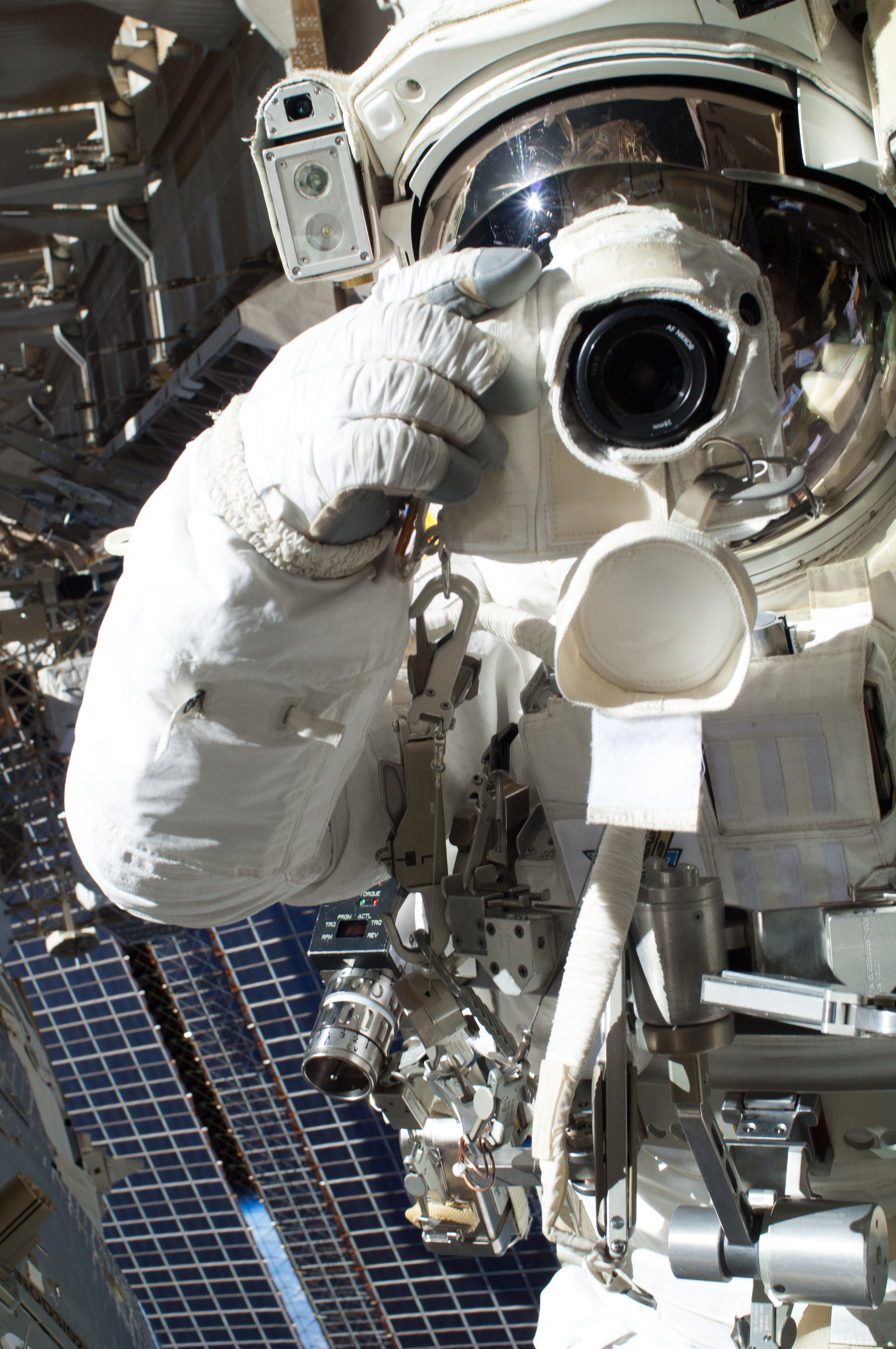
Astronaut Christopher Cassidy holding a camera while on EVA (Space-walk)

NASA has operated several cameras on spacecraft over the course of its history.

== Artemis program ==
- Nikon D5, digital, used on Artemis II
- Nikon Z9, digital, selected as the Handheld Universal Lunar Camera

== Apollo program ==
- Apollo TV camera
- Hasselblad "Electric Camera" (modified 500 EL) with 70 mm film
- Maurer Data Acquisition Camera (DAC) with 16 mm film
- Nikon F with 35 mm film
- Mapping (Metric) Camera (7.6 cm focal length) with 127 mm film, on Apollo 15, 16, and 17 (see Sherman Fairchild#Lunar photography)
- Stellar Camera (7.6 cm focal length) with 35 mm film, on Apollo 15, 16, and 17
- Panoramic Camera (61 cm focal length) with 127 mm film, on Apollo 15, 16, and 17

== Skylab ==
Personal camera equipment:

- Television camera
- 16 mm film video camera
- 35 mm film camera
- 70 mm film camera

== Space Shuttle program ==
- Space Shuttle booster cameras.
- Space Shuttle External Tank camera
- Columbia
  - Shuttle Infrared Leeside Temperature Sensing experiment
- Nikon NASA F4

== Lunar missions (non-crewed) ==
- Pioneer program, 1958–1960
  - Pioneer 1, television camera
  - Pioneer 2, television camera
- Lunar Orbiter program, Lunar Orbiter 1–5, 1966–1967

The camera used two lenses to simultaneously expose a wide-angle and a high-resolution image on the same film. The wide-angle, medium resolution mode used an 80 mm F 2.8 Xenotar lens manufactured by Schneider Kreuznach, Germany. The high-resolution mode used a 610 mm F 5.6 Panoramic lens manufactured by the Pacific Optical Company. The film was developed on-orbit, and then scanned by a photomultiplier for transmission to Earth.

- Clementine, 1994
  - Ultraviolet/Visible camera (UV/Vis)
  - Near-Infrared camera (NIR)
  - High-Resolution Camera (HIRES)
- Lunar Precursor Robotic Program, 2009
  - Lunar Reconnaissance Orbiter
    - Lunar Reconnaissance Orbiter Camera (LROC)
  - Lunar Crater Observation and Sensing Satellite
    - One visible, two near infrared, and two mid-infrared cameras
- Gravity Recovery and Interior Laboratory, 2011
  - Moon Knowledge Acquired by Middle school students (MoonKAM)

== Other missions ==
- Hazcam
- Navcam
- Pancam
- Cachecam

== See also ==
- List of cameras on ISS
- Nikon NASA F4
