= Tyler Nordgren =

Dr Tyler Eugene Nordgren
- Born: November 18, 1969
- Education: Reed College; Cornell University
- Scientific career
- Fields: Astronomy
- Workplaces: United States Naval Observatory Flagstaff Station; Lowell Observatory; University of Redlands
- Thesis: A Neutral Hydrogen Study of Close and Wide Galaxy Pairs (1997)

Tyler Eugene Nordgren (November 18, 1969) is an astronomer and professor of physics at the University of Redlands.

== Education ==
Nordgren earned a B.A. in physics from Reed College and an M.S. and Ph.D. in astronomy from Cornell University.

== Research ==
Before joining the University of Redlands in 2001, Nordgren was an astronomer at the United States Naval Observatory Flagstaff Station and Lowell Observatory.

In 2004, with six other astronomers and artists, Nordgren helped develop MarsDials, functioning sundials that NASA's Spirit, Opportunity, and Curiosity rovers carried with them to Mars.

Nordgren also designed the giant sundial that resides on the wall of Appleton Hall at the University of Redlands and is accurate within 10 minutes.

For the past five years, Nordgren has been traveling around the U.S. to educate the public about what eclipses are and how the opportunity to see the total solar eclipse on August 21, 2017 should not be missed. More of Nordgren's research on eclipses can be found in his most recent book Sun Moon Earth: The History of Solar Eclipses from Omens of Doom to Einstein and Exoplanets (Basic Books, 2016).

== Collaboration with U.S. National Park Service ==
Nordgren has been a member of the National Park Service Night Sky Team since 2007, working with the U.S. National Park Service to protect the night skies and promote astronomy education in U.S. national parks.

Nordgren has helped document the parks' night skies with photography that has been on display in galleries from New York City to Flagstaff, Arizona, and is on display in a number of national parks. The Acadia Night Sky Festival has featured many of his photographs. Nordgren has also developed a poster campaign in conjunction with the National Park Service to “See the Milky Way” in America’s parks where “Half the Park is After Dark.”

His 2010 book Stars Above, Earth Below: A Guide to Astronomy in the National Parks (Praxis, 2010) was published as a way to spread the message of the importance of protecting the night sky.

== Professional affiliations ==
Nordgren was elected to the board of directors of the International Dark-Sky Association (IDA) in 2011. He is also a member of the American Astronomical Society.

== Selected publications ==
- Nordgren, T. E., Sun Moon Earth: The History of Solar Eclipses from Omens of Doom to Einstein and Exoplanets, 2016. (Named "One of Amazon's Best Science Books of 2016")
- Nordgren, T. E., Stars Above, Earth Below: A Guide to Astronomy in the National Parks, 2010 (Springer).
- Nordgren, T. E., Lane, B. F., Hindsley, R. B., and Kervella, P., "Calibration of the Barnes–Evans Relation Using Interferometric Observations of Cepheids", The Astronomical Journal, 123, 3380, 2002.
- Nordgren, T. E., Sudol, J. J., and Mozurkewich, D., "Comparison of Stellar Angular Diameters from the NPOI, the Mark III Optical Interferometer, and the Infrared Flux Method", The Astronomical Journal, 122, 2707, 2001.
- Nordgren, T. E., and NPOI Collaboration, "Stellar Angular Diameters of Late–Type Giants and Supergiants Measured with the Navy Prototype Optical Interferometer", The Astronomical Journal, 118, 3032, 1999.
