= Mini-TES =

Infrared spectrometer used for detecting the composition of a material

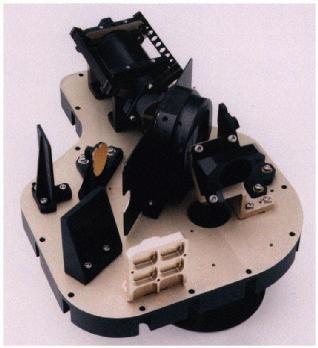
An image of a Mini-TES

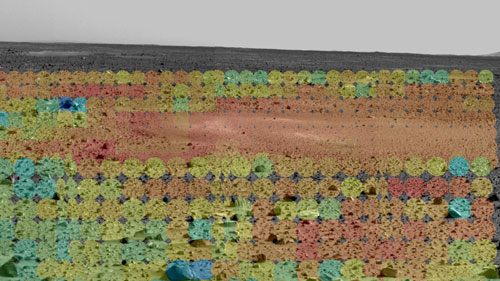
An image from Mini-TES on board the Mars Exploration Rovers.

The Miniature Thermal Emission Spectrometer (Mini-TES) is an infrared spectrometer used for detecting the composition of a material (typically rocks) from a distance. By making its measurements in the thermal infrared part of the electromagnetic spectrum, it has the ability to penetrate through the dust coatings common to the Martian surface which is usually problematic for remote sensing observations. There is one on each of the two Mars Exploration Rovers.

== Development ==
The Mini-TES was originally developed by Raytheon for the Department of Geological Sciences at Arizona State University. The Mini-TES is a miniaturized version of Raytheon's Mars Global Surveyor (MGS) TES, built by Arizona State University and Raytheon SAS’ Santa Barbara Remote Sensing. The MGS TES data helped scientists choose landing sites for the Spirit and Opportunity Mars explorer rovers.

== Martian soil ==
The Mini-TES is used for identifying promising rocks and soils for closer examination, and to determine the processes that formed Martian rocks. It measures the infrared radiation that the target rock or object emits in 167 different wavelengths, providing information about the target's composition. One particular goal is to search for minerals that were formed by the action of water, such as carbonates and clays. The instrument can also look skyward to provide temperature profiles of the Martian atmosphere and detect the abundance of dust and water vapor.

The instrument is located inside the warm electronics box in the body of the rover - the mirror redirects radiation into the aperture from above. The Mini-TES instruments aboard the MERs Opportunity and Spirit were never expected to survive the cold Martian winter even if the rovers themselves survived. It was thought that a small potassium bromide (KBr) beamsplitter which was housed in an aluminium fitting would crack due to the mismatched coefficient of thermal expansion. This never happened however and the Mini-TES instrument on both rovers has survived several Martian winters, and the Spirit rover continued to periodically use the Mini-TES for remote sensing until the end of its mission in 2010. (The Mini-TES on the Opportunity rover was rendered inoperable because of accumulated dust on the mirror following the 2007 dust storm).

There are two other types of spectrometers mounted on the rover's arm which provide additional information about the composition when the rover is close enough to touch the object.

Mini-TES can work with Pancams to analyze surroundings.

The Mini-TES weighs 2.1 kg (4.6 lb) of the total 185 kg (408 lb) for the whole rover.

== See also ==
- Heat Flow and Physical Properties Package (included an infrared radiometer)
