= Handheld Universal Lunar Camera =

Camera modified for the Artemis lunar program

The Handheld Universal Lunar Camera (HULC) is a handheld commercial off-the-shelf (COTS) camera which will be used in NASA's Artemis lunar program. The camera chosen for this is the Nikon Z9.

== History ==
Nikon Corporation and NASA share a long history together with Nikon being the camera brand that continuously supplies the agency with modified cameras since the 1970s.

On February 29, 2024, NASA revealed a signed agreement between them and Nikon to develop the Handheld Universal Lunar Camera (HULC) as the first handheld camera to be used on the Moon, for use beginning with the Artemis III mission (now the Artemis IV). The resulting design consists of a modified Z9 camera with thermal shielding, custom grip with modified buttons, and modified electrical components to minimize issues caused by solar radiation.

== Space flights ==
On the Artemis II mission, in addition to Nikon D5 cameras, a Z9 was included for testing. As described by Artemis II Commander Reid Wiseman, “That’s the camera that they’ll be using, the crew will be using on Artemis III plus, so we were fighting really hard to get that on the vehicle to test out in a high-radiation environment in deep space.”

== See also ==
- Nikon Z9
- List of NASA cameras on spacecraft
