= MarsDial =

Sundial used for missions to Mars

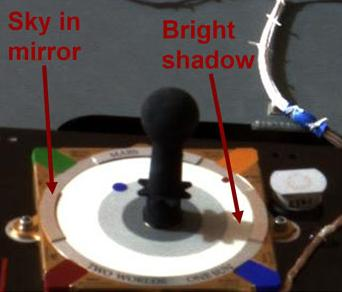
An image of MarsDial

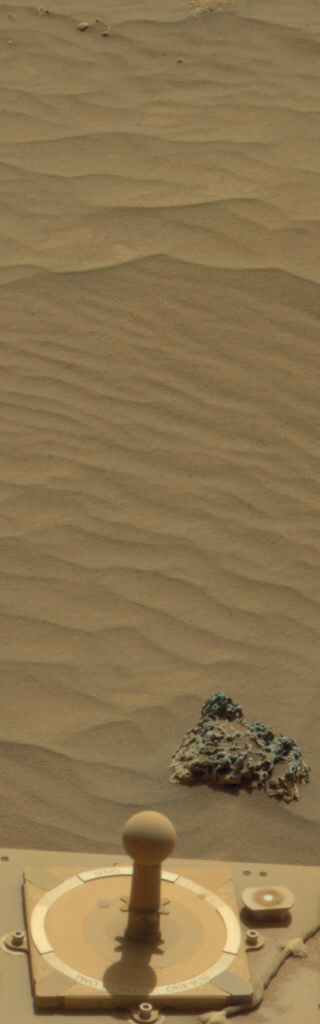
MarsDial on Spirit rover on Mars

The MarsDial is a sundial that was devised for missions to Mars. It is used to calibrate the Pancam cameras of the Mars landers. MarsDials were placed on the Spirit and Opportunity Mars rovers, inscribed with the words "Two worlds, One sun" and the word "Mars" in 22 languages. The MarsDial can function as a gnomon, the stick or other vertical part of a sundial. The length and direction of the shadow cast by the stick allows observers to calculate the time of day. The sundial can also be used to tell which way is North, and to overcome the limitations of a magnetic north different from a true north.

The sundial design team included Bill Nye "The Science Guy," space artist Jon Lomberg, and astronomers Woodruff Sullivan, Steve Squyres, James Bell and Tyler Nordgren. CAD design and drawings were done by Jason Suchman. The MarsDial was intended to be part science outreach, part calibration target.

Curiosity (MSL), the rover which landed on Mars in August 2012, used a spare sundial remaining from the Mars Exploration Rovers. It has a new text that reads "Mars 2012" and "To Mars To Explore".

The ball is the nodus, the post is the gnomon. The colors on the corners are for calibrating colors, and the inner circles are in greyscale. There is a mirrored section on the middle circle to reflect the sky.

The sundials are also "message artifacts"—something for future human explorers to find.

== Time-lapse ==
Time-lapse video of an analemma from Mars, plotting the course of the Sun over a Martian year (about two Earth years)

== List ==
- MER-A Spirit
- MER-B Opportunity
- MSL Curiosity

== See also ==
- Phoenix (spacecraft)#Phoenix DVD (Phoenix Mars lander has a DVD)
- Voyager Golden Record
