= Astrionics =

Astrionics is the science and technology of the development and application of electronic systems, subsystems, and components used in spacecraft. The electronic systems on-board a spacecraft are embedded systems and include attitude determination and control, communications, command and telemetry, and computer systems. Sensors refers to the electronic components on board a spacecraft.

For engineers one of the most important considerations that must be made in the design process is the environment in which the spacecraft systems and components must operate and endure. The challenges of designing systems and components for the space environment include more than the fact that space is a vacuum.

== Attitude determination and control ==
One of the most vital roles electronics and sensors play in a mission and performance of a spacecraft is to determine and control its attitude, or how it is oriented in space. The orientation of a spacecraft varies depending on the mission. The spacecraft may need to be stationary and always pointed at Earth, which is the case for a weather or communication satellite. However, there may also be the need to fix the spacecraft about an axis and then have it spin. The attitude determination and control system, ACS, ensures the spacecraft is behaving correctly. Below are several ways in which ACS can obtain the necessary measurements to determine this.

=== Magnetometer ===
Magnetometers measure the strength of the Earth's magnetic field in one direction. For measurements on all three axes, the required device would consist of three orthogonal magnetometers. Given the spacecraft's position, the magnetic field measurements can be compared to a known magnetic field which is given by the International Geomagnetic Reference Field model. Measurements made by magnetometers are affected by noise consisting of alignment error, scale factor errors, and spacecraft electrical activity. For near-Earth orbits, the error in the modelled field direction may vary from 0.5 degrees near the Equator to 3 degrees near the magnetic poles, where erratic auroral currents play a large role. The limitation of such a device is that in orbits far from Earth, the magnetic field is too weak and is actually dominated by the interplanetary field which is complicated and unpredictable.

=== Sun sensors ===
A Sun sensor works on the light entering a thin slit on top of a rectangular chamber that casts an image of a thin line on the bottom of the chamber, which is lined with a network of light-sensitive cells. These cells measure the distance of the image from a centerline and using the height of the chamber can determine the angle of refraction. The cells operate based on the photoelectric effect. Incoming photons excite electrons and therefore causing a voltage across the cell, which is, in turn, converted into a digital signal. By placing two sensors perpendicular to each other the complete direction of the Sun with respect to the sensor axes can be measured.

==== Digital solar aspect detectors ====
Also known as DSADs, these devices are purely digital Sun sensors. They determine the angles of the Sun by determining which of the light-sensitive cells in the sensor is the most strongly illuminated. By knowing the intensity of light striking neighbouring pixels, the direction of the centroid of the Sun can be calculated to within a few arcseconds.

=== Earth horizon sensor ===
==== Static ====
Static Earth horizon sensors contain a number of sensors and sense infrared radiation from the Earth’s surface with a field of view slightly larger than the Earth. The accuracy of determining the geocenter is 0.1 degrees in near-Earth orbit to 0.01 degrees at GEO. Their use is generally restricted to spacecraft with a circular orbit.

==== Scanning ====
Scanning Earth horizon sensors use a spinning mirror or prism and focus a narrow beam of light onto a sensing element usually called a bolometer. The spinning causes the device to sweep out the area of a cone and electronics inside the sensor detect when the infrared signal from Earth is first received and then lost. The time between is used to determine Earth’s width. From this, the roll angle can be determined. A factor that plays into the accuracy of such sensors is the fact the Earth is not perfectly circular. Another is that the sensor does not detect land or ocean, but infrared in the atmosphere which can reach certain intensities due to the season and latitude.

=== GPS ===
This sensor is simple in that using one signal many characteristics can be determined. A signal carries satellite identification, position, the duration of the propagated signal and clock information. Using a constellation of 36 GPS satellites, of which only four are needed, navigation, positioning, precise time, orbit, and attitude can be determined. One advantage of GPS is all orbits from Low Earth orbit to Geosynchronous orbit can use GPS for ACS.

== Command and telemetry ==
Another system which is vital to a spacecraft is the command and telemetry system, so much in fact, that it is the first system to be redundant. The communication from the ground to the spacecraft is the responsibility of the command system. The telemetry system handles communications from the spacecraft to the ground. Signals from ground stations are sent to command the spacecraft what to do, while telemetry reports back on the status of those commands including spacecraft vitals and mission specific data.

=== Command systems ===
The purpose of a command system is to give the spacecraft a set of instructions to perform. Commands for a spacecraft are executed based on priority. Some commands require immediate execution; other may specify particular delay times that must elapse prior to their execution, an absolute time at which the command must be executed, or an event or combination of events that must occur before the command is executed. Spacecraft perform a range of functions based on the command they receive. These include: power to be applied to or removed from a spacecraft subsystem or experiment, alter operating modes of the subsystem, and control various functions of the spacecraft guidance and ACS. Commands also control booms, antennas, solar cell arrays, and protective covers. A command system may also be used to upload entire programs into the RAM of programmable, micro-processor based, onboard subsystems.

The radio-frequency signal that is transmitted from the ground is received by the command receiver and is amplified and demodulated. Amplification is necessary because the signal is very weak after traveling the long distance. Next in the command system is the command decoder. This device examines the subcarrier signal and detects the command message that it is carrying. The output for the decoder is normally non-return-to-zero data. The command decoder also provides clock information to the command logic and this tells the command logic when a bit is valid on the serial data line. The command bit stream that is sent to the command processor has a unique feature for spacecraft. Among the different types of bits sent, the first are spacecraft address bits. These carry a specific identification code for a particular spacecraft and prevent the intended command from being performed by another spacecraft. This is necessary because there are many satellites using the same frequency and modulation type.

The microprocessor receives inputs from the command decoder, operates on these inputs in accordance with a program that is stored in ROM or RAM, and then outputs the results to the interface circuitry. Because there is such a wide variety of command types and messages, most command systems are implemented using programmable micro-processors. The type of interface circuitry needed is based on the command sent by the processor. These commands include relay, pulse, level, and data commands. Relay commands activate the coils of electromagnetic relays in the central power switching unit. Pulse commands are short pulses of voltage or current that is sent by the command logic to the appropriate subsystem. A level command is exactly like a logic pulse command except that a logic level is delivered instead of a logic pulse. Data commands transfer data words to the destination subsystem.

=== Telemetry systems ===
Commands to a spacecraft would be useless if ground control did not know what the spacecraft was doing. Telemetry includes information such as:

- Status data concerning spacecraft resources, health, attitude and mode of operation
- Scientific data gathered by onboard sensors (telescopes, spectrometers, magnetometers, accelerometers, electrometers, thermometers, etc.)
- Specific spacecraft orbit and timing data that may be used for guidance and navigation by ground, sea, or air vehicles
- Images captured by onboard cameras (visible or infrared)
- Locations of other objects, either on the Earth or in space, that are being tracked by the spacecraft
- Telemetry data that has been relayed from the ground or from another spacecraft in a satellite constellation

The telemetry system is responsible for acquisition from the sensors, conditioners, selectors, and converters, for processing, including compression, format, and storage, and finally for transmission, which includes encoding, modulating, transmitting and the antenna.

There are several unique features of telemetry system design for spacecraft. One of these is the approach to the fact that for any given satellite in LEO, because it is traveling so quickly, it may only be in contact with a particular station for ten to twenty minutes. This would require hundreds of ground stations to stay in constant communication, which is not at all practical. One solution to this is onboard data storage. Data storage can accumulate data slowly throughout the orbit and dump it quickly when over a ground station. In deep space missions, the recorder is often used the opposite way, to capture high-rate data and play it back slowly over data-rate-limited links. Another solution is data relay satellites. NASA has satellites in GEO called TDRS, Tracking and Data Relay Satellites, which relay commands and telemetry from LEO satellites. Prior to TDRS, astronauts could communicate with the Earth for only about 15% of the orbit, using 14 NASA ground stations around the world. With TDRS, coverage of low-altitude satellites is global, from a single ground station at White Sands, New Mexico.

Another unique feature of telemetry systems is autonomy. Spacecraft require the ability to monitor their internal functions and act on information without ground control interaction. The need for autonomy originates from problems such as insufficient ground coverage, communication geometry, being too near the Earth-Sun line (where solar noise interferes with radio frequencies), or simply for security purposes. Autonomy is important so that the telemetry system already has the capability to monitor the spacecraft functions and the command systems have the ability to give the necessary commands to reconfigure based on the needs of the action to be taken. There are three steps to this process:

1. The telemetry system must be able to recognize when one of the functions it's monitoring deviates beyond the normal ranges.

2. The command system must know how to interpret abnormal functions, so that it can generate a proper command response.

3. The command and telemetry systems must be capable of communicating with each other.

== Sensors ==
Sensors can be classified into two categories: health sensors and payload sensors. Health sensors monitor the spacecraft or payload functionality and can include temperature sensors, strain gauges, gyros and accelerometers. Payload sensors may include radar imaging systems and IR cameras. While payload sensors represent some of the reason the mission exists, it is the health sensors that measure and control systems to ensure optimum operation.

== See also ==
- Avionics, similar, for aircraft
