= Sony mount =

Sony mount may refer to:

- Sony A-mount, a Minolta A-mount-compatible auto-focus lens mount for APS-C and full-frame digital SLR/SLT/ILCA cameras since 2006 (1985)
- Sony E-mount, a lens mount for APS-C and full-frame (FE) digital mirrorless cameras since 2010
- Sony FZ-mount, a lens mount for professional digital video cameras since 2010
- Sony B4-mount, a lens mount for professional digital video cameras
- Sony PL-mount, a lens mount for professional video cameras
- Sony Mavica mount, two lens mounts for Mavica cameras between 1981 and 1992

== See also ==
- Zeiss A-mount (ZA)
- Zeiss E-mount (ZA)
- Hasselblad A-mount
- Hasselblad E-mount
- Konica Minolta A-mount
- Minolta A-mount
