= Still video camera =

Electronic camera that takes still images

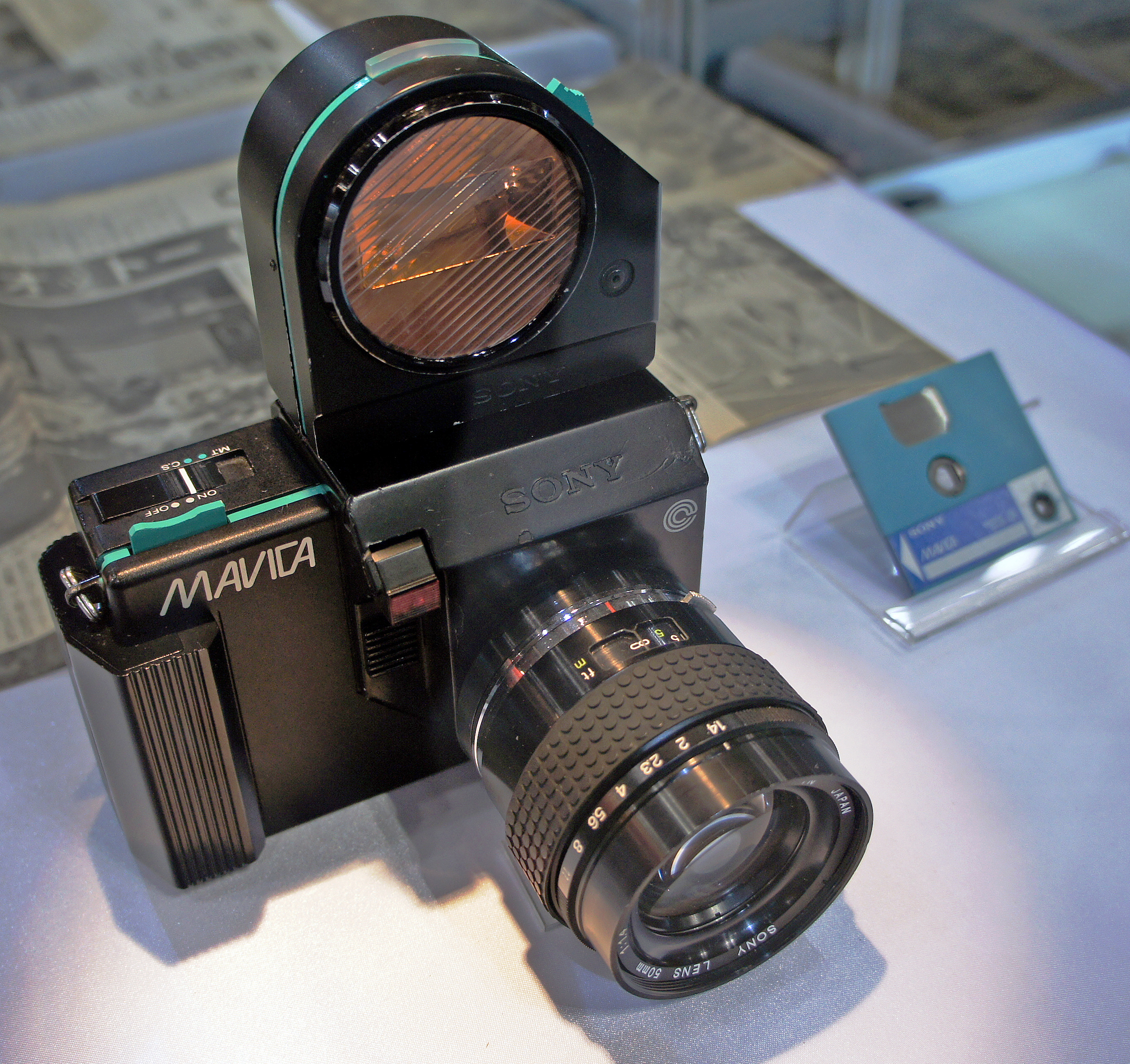
- Prototype Sony Mavica still video camera from 1981.
- Application: Still photography & photojournalism
- Examples: Sony Mavica, Canon Xapshot
- Media: Video floppy (typical)
- Resolution: Typically limited to single SDTV (NTSC, PAL, or SECAM) field or frame

A still video camera (SVC) is a type of electronic camera that takes still images and stores them as single frames of video. They peaked in popularity in the late 1980s and can be seen as the predecessor to the digital camera. However, unlike the latter, the image storage in such cameras is based on analog technology, rather than as a digital file.

== Design ==
The most common design has an image sensor and basic processing hardware similar to that of a consumer camcorder designed for analog television using the appropriate regional format (NTSC, PAL, or SECAM). However, instead of storing consecutive interlaced fields on tape to form a moving image, a single field or frame (combined from two fields) is extracted from the output video signal and saved on a rotating magnetic disk, typically a standard Video Floppy. During playback, the disk is spun at the frame rate of the video system with the field or frame being read repeatedly. This produces a conventional analog video signal that can be viewed on a normal television.

The resolution is limited by the device's playback system, which is equivalent to pausing a single field or frame from a video recorder. Since the image is stored as a conventional analog video field or frame, the resolution is limited to the regional SDTV format; in addition, since the images are not stored digitally, transferring the images to a computer requires a video capture card.

== History ==
=== Development and prototyping ===
Canon began developing a still video system as early as 1977 following a secret presentation from Texas Instruments (TI). Processing the image data from a CCD sensor into a digital file would have required a supercomputer at the time, so a strategic decision was made to use analog recording methods, and Canon recruited Sony and other manufacturers to create a standard format, resulting in the Video Floppy. Other members included JVC, Matsushita (Panasonic), Olympus, Philips, and RCA.

The first still video camera was a prototype Mavica (a portmanteau of magnetic video camera), which was unveiled by Sony chair Akio Morita on August 24, 1981. The prototype Mavica was equipped with an interchangeable lens and was approximately the size and weight of a conventional 35-mm SLR camera at 130 mm × 89 mm × 52 mm (5.1 in × 3.5 in × 2.0 in) and 790 g (28 oz). It offered shutter speeds ranging from 1/60 to 1/2000 s; the video floppy (branded "Mavipak" by Sony) was capable of storing up to 50 images. The Mavica was equipped with a single CCD sensor with a basic resolution of 570 × 490, but resolution was limited to approximately 350 horizontal lines. This was because it was designed for video playback, which is composed of interlaced video fields of approximately 240~280 horizontal lines; the Mavica's resolution was slightly boosted by recording color information on a separate FM channel, instead of as a subcarrier to the analog signal. At the time, Sony stated it would be 15 to 24 months before the Mavica would be marketed, at an estimated cost of US$660 (equivalent to $2,340 in 2025) for the camera and an additional US$220 (equivalent to $780 in 2025) for the playback unit.

=== Film manufacturer responses ===
At the time, both Polaroid Corporation and Eastman Kodak were rumored to have developed competing still cameras similarly using image sensors instead of film. Polaroid offered no comment regarding Sony's Mavica, but previously had published a patent describing a camera that stored images electronically by 1980. Kodak published its position in an internal employee newsletter: "Technical capability does not necessarily mean mass-market capability. For any number of reasons—including costs, convenience, quality, and size among others—electronic systems don't meet the needs and expectations of the amateur still-picture-taker." A Fuji executive, on the other hand, stated in 1980: "Silver halides will continue to be dominant for the next five years, but beyond that you will see more interfacing with electronics." Kodak was developing its own CCD sensors and prototype digital file-recording cameras, including both the Lloyd/Sasson 1975 digital camera and the 1988 1-megapixel monochrome "Electro-Optic Camera" for a U.S. Government client.

The film companies would go on to release standalone appliances to view, record, and print images stored on video floppies, seeing the technology as a way to replace conventional film processing and slideshows, rather than film cameras. At Photokina '84, Fujifilm displayed its Fujix TV-Photo System, which was a Video Floppy player that could be connected to a user's TV; floppies could be created for a nominal fee when consumers dropped off film at a Fuji processing center in Japan. Kodak showed off its initial still video efforts in 1985, including the Color Video Imager, a color printer designed to take any analog video signal, and the Still Video Player/Recorder, which transferred a single still frame from an analog video source to a video floppy. The Color Video Imager displayed the input signal on a cathode-ray tube to expose a sheet of instant film; the Still Video Player/Recorder offered interline interpolation to improve the display of a single field; estimated retail price was US$700 (equivalent to $2,060 in 2025) for the Color Video Imager. Sony would respond with the ProMavica Recorder, announced in May 1986.

=== Professional cameras ===
Early professional SVCs

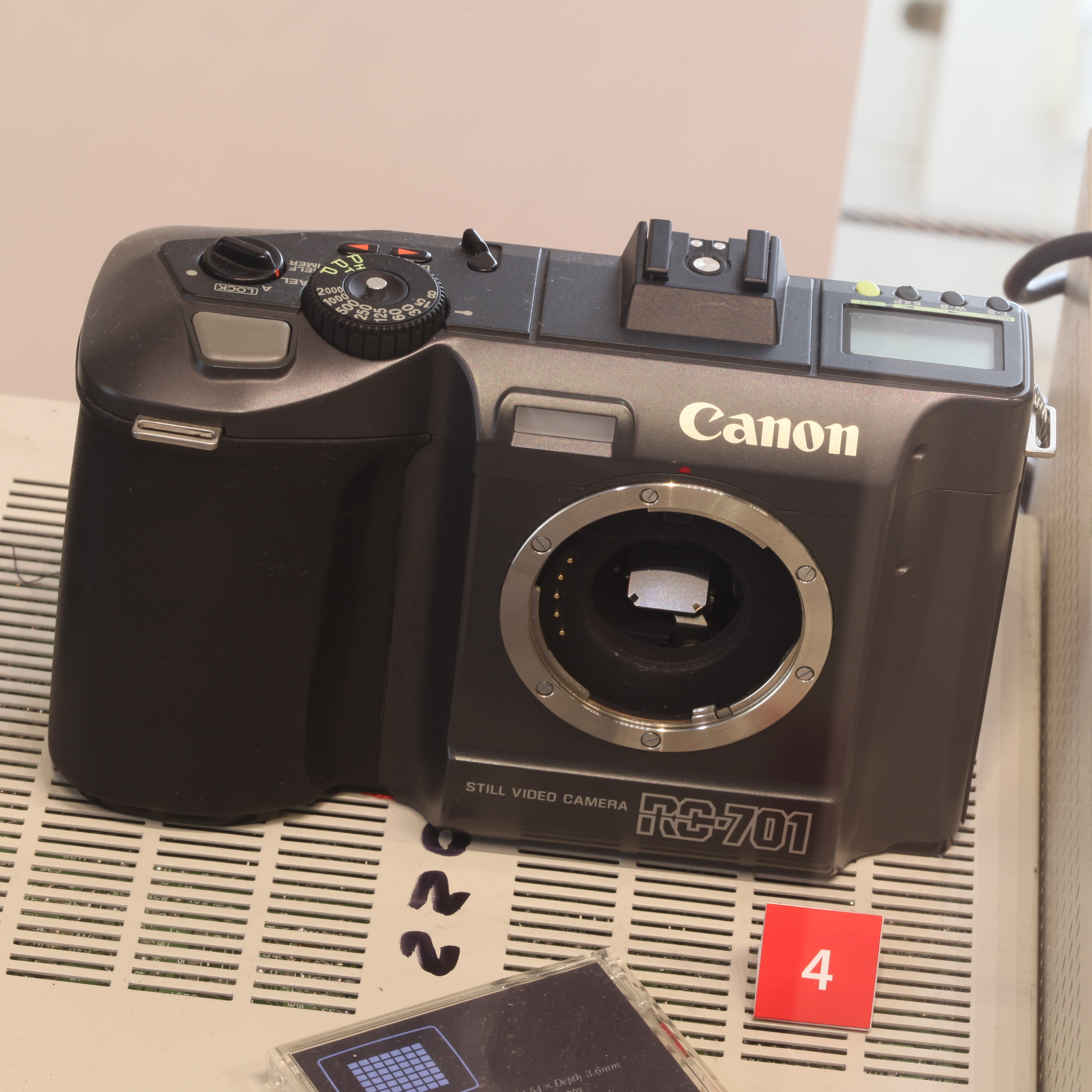
Canon RC-701 from 1986 (photographed in 2010)

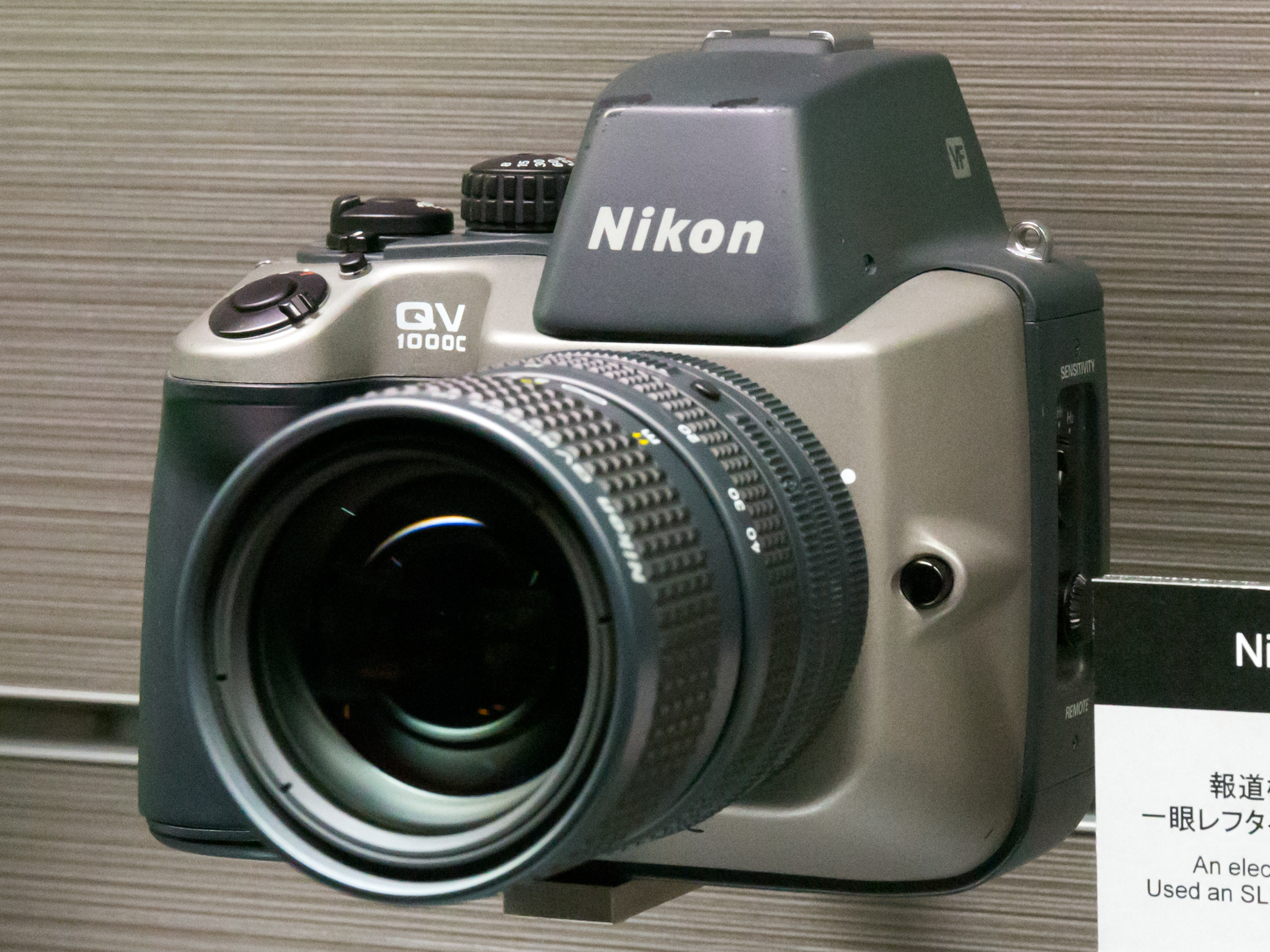
Nikon QV-1000C from 1988 (photographed in 2015)

The Yomiuri Shimbun approached Canon in September 1983, asking for a SVC to use at the 1984 Los Angeles Olympics; the resulting system would also require a transmitter, receiver, and printer. Canon's experiment was a success, and Yomiuri photographers would capture images of Japanese athletes from the 1984 Summer Olympics using a prototype Canon SVC (model D701) and transmit them for rapid publication, which would have been impossible with conventional film photographs. TI helped Canon develop the CCD sensor for the prototype D701. The 1984 Summer Olympics proved to be fertile ground for SVC development; Sony developed a similar SVC system for the Asahi Shimbun and Nikon developed the NT-1000 Direct Transmitter for Kyodo News, although both Sony's and Nikon's systems were capable of only transmitting black and white images, while Canon provided color. Nikon released the NT-1000 in 1983 as an alternative solution for photojournalists on location, the first portable machine to scan and transmit conventional film.

At Photokina '84, Copal and Panasonic showed prototype SVCs. Konica's prototype SVC, initially displayed in 1985, and as a more advanced prototype in 1987, carried an estimated price of US$4,000 (equivalent to $11,300 in 2025). Kodak demonstrated a prototype SVC in 1987; coverage focused on the handling of the prototype ("held the way binoculars are held" with top-mounted controls and rear displays) and weight, at 4 lb (1.8 kg).

Canon continued to develop the D701 into the RC-701, which was the first SVC to be marketed commercially in 1986, aimed at professional photographers and news agencies; three interchangeable dedicated lenses were developed for the RC-701, and FD-mount lenses could be attached via an adapter. The RC-701 used a 380,000-pixel CCD made by TI, and was priced at US$2,595 (equivalent to $7,620 in 2025) for the body alone. It was the cornerstone of Canon's pro-oriented Still Video System, which also included a transceiver and printer. The total system cost was approximately US$33,000 (equivalent to $97,000 in 2025). The dye-sublimation printer that was developed for the system would go on to spawn a separate commercial line which Canon branded SELPHY. Sony was second to market with the ProMavica MVC-A7AF of 1987, which offered the ability to record 10 seconds of audio. In November 1987, Minolta released two still video backs that could be fitted to its 7000 and 9000 autofocus SLRs, designated SB-70(S) and SB-90(S), respectively. The retail price in 1988 was US$2,915 (equivalent to $7,940 in 2025) each. Nikon countered by announcing its competing QV-1000C professional SVC with supporting system hardware, including two dedicated lenses and a transmitter, in August 1988.

The first photographs in a United States newspaper taken with the Canon Still Video System were published in USA Today on October 19, 1987, covering the 1987 World Series. However, due to their poor resolution, photojournalists generally were hesitant to adopt SVCs. It has been reported that one of the Tiananmen Square "tank man" photographs was captured using a Sony ProMavica; according to the cameraman, Johnathan Schaer of Cable News Network, it was instead a still field captured on videotape and sent using the transmitter for the ProMavica.

=== Consumer market ===
Early consumer SVCs

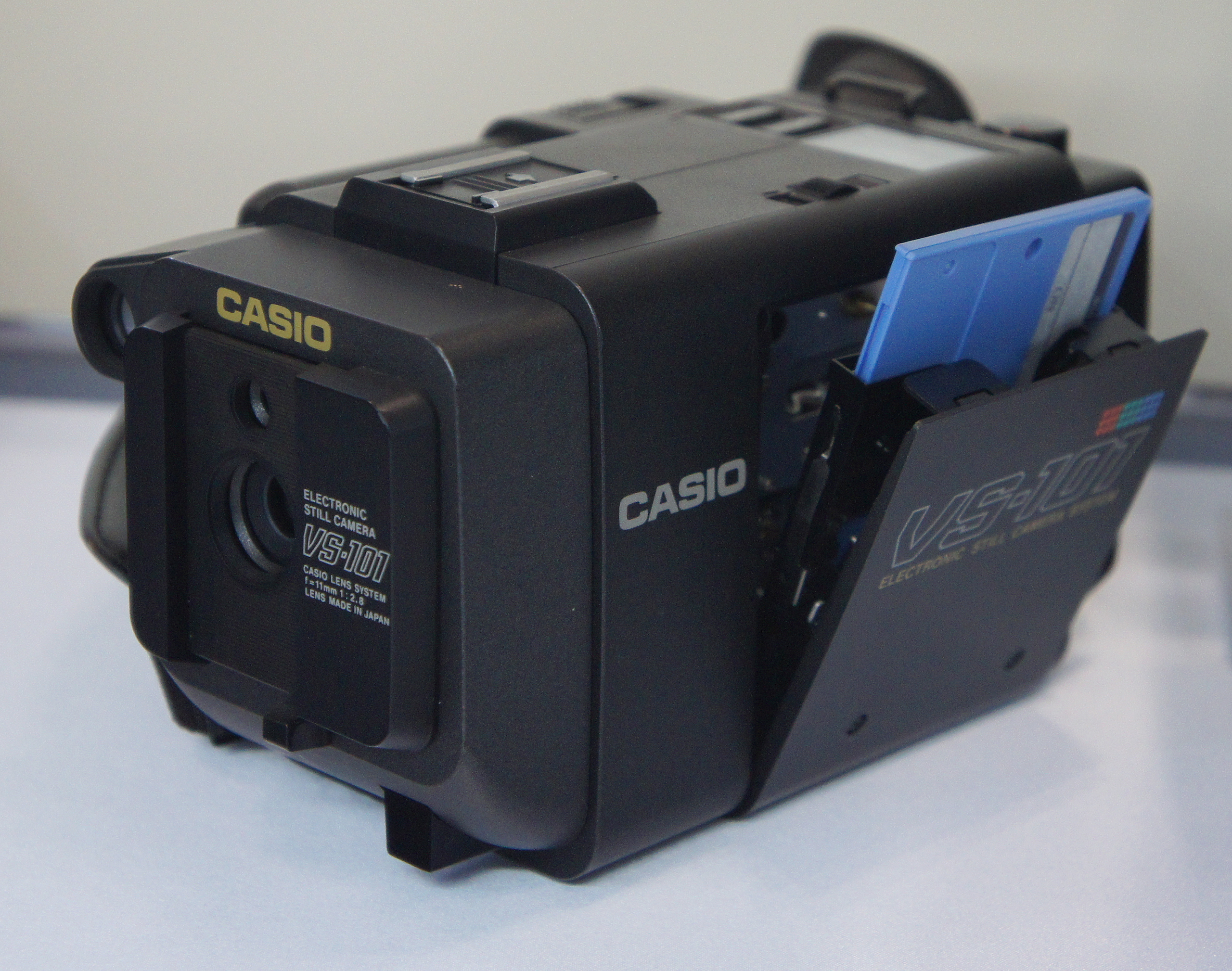
Casio VS-101

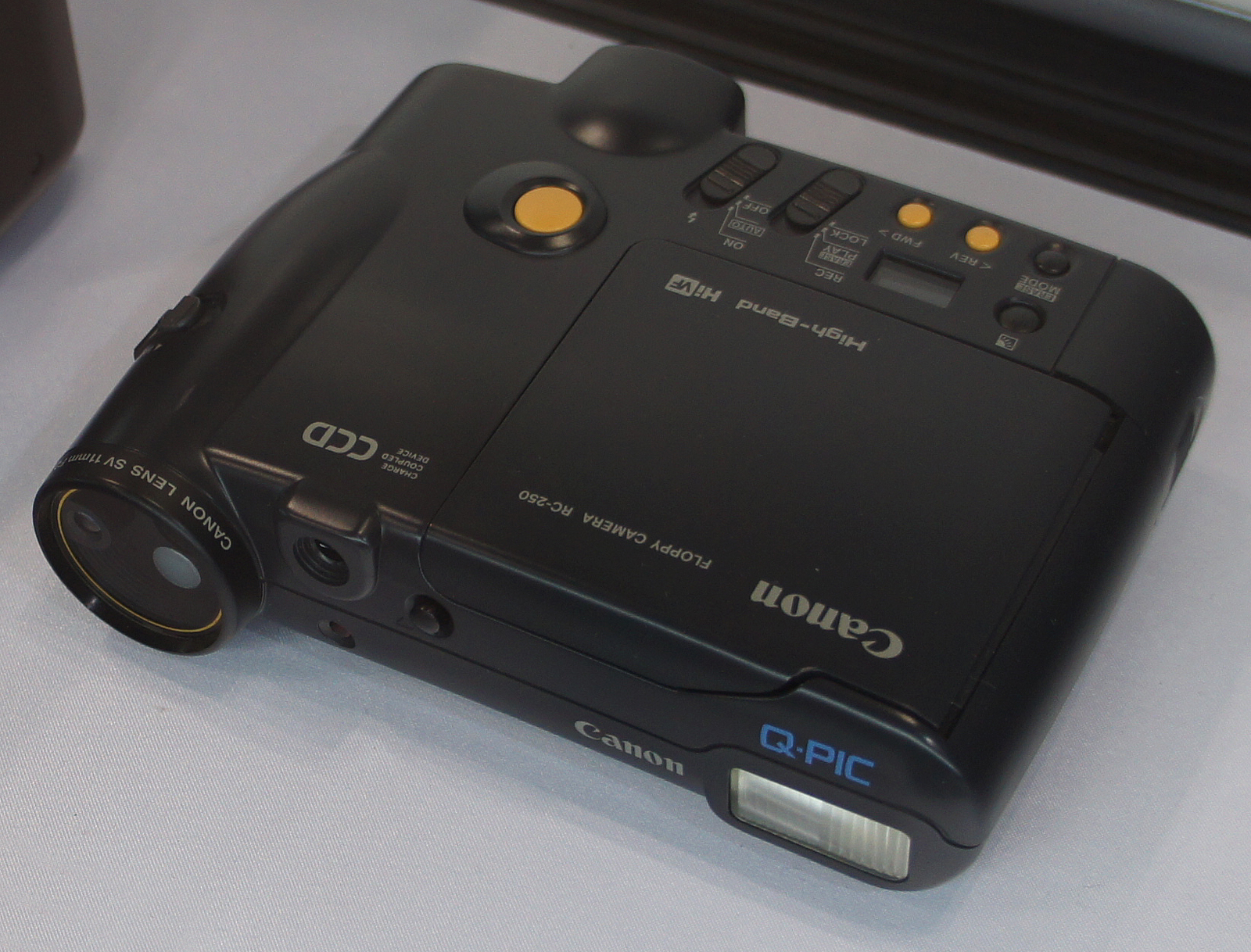
Canon RC-250, aka Q-PIC/Ion/Xapshot

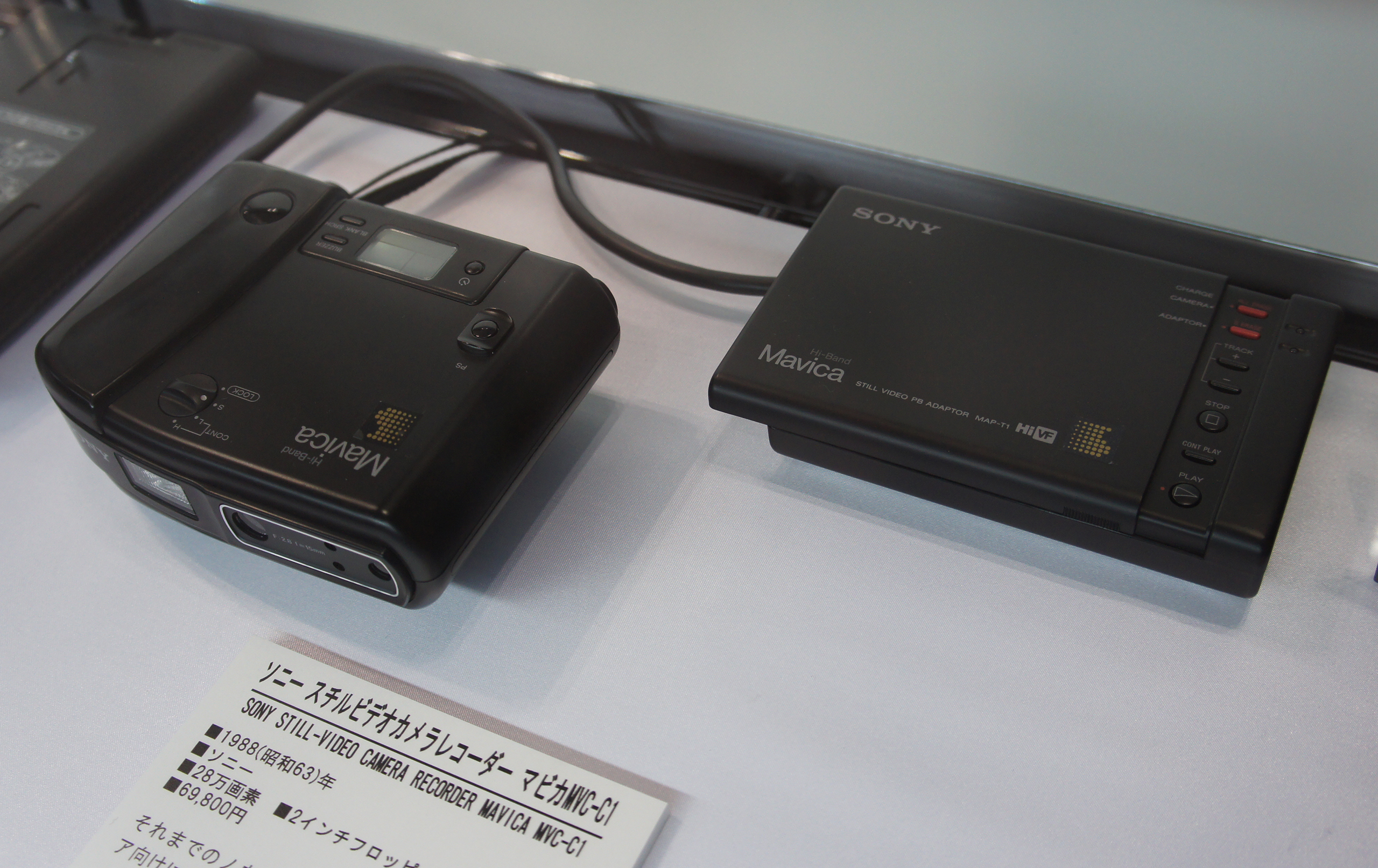
Sony MVC-C1 and MAP-T1

By 1988 and 1989, the first SVCs marketed to consumers were announced at Photokina and Consumer Electronics Show (CES), respectively. Casio would be the first to market with its VS-101 in 1988, at an estimated price of US$1,500 (equivalent to $4,080 in 2025). At the 1989 CES, Sony's Mavica MVC-C1 was priced at US$900 (equivalent to $2,340 in 2025), including the required MAP-T1 playback unit, and Canon's RC-250, aka Q-PIC/Ion/Xapshot, was under US$800 (equivalent to $2,080 in 2025); in addition, the 1989 CES exhibited a prototype from Sanyo. Both the Canon and Sony used the "High Band" recording format, which increased the luminance carrier frequency and bandwidth to improve resolution. The RC-250's CCD sensor was again developed with TI. Other manufacturers of consumer-level SVCs included Fujifilm, Konica, Kyocera (as Yashica), Olympus, and Panasonic.

However, the increased interest and availability of consumer SVCs was paralleled by the rise of still cameras recording digital files, which was marked by rapid developments including the prototype Fujix DS-1P, announced at Photokina '88 and equipped with a removable memory card developed with Toshiba; the Dycam Model 1 of 1990, also marketed as the Logitech FotoMan as the first consumer digital camera; the 1991 Nikon F3-based Kodak DCS 100 for professionals; and the Casio QV-10 of 1995, which was equipped with a color LCD, allowing users to review and delete still images on the same unit. The increased resolution and enhanced capabilities of digital cameras soon eclipsed the features of SVCs; in a 1995 review comparing digital and still video cameras, MacWorld concluded the digital cameras had superior resolution, but cited the large resolution gap between the high-end digital cameras (at 1.5 MP) and 35-mm film (estimated at 20 MP). Most SVCs were discontinued by the mid 1990s.
