= Minolta Maxxum 9000 =

Minolta 9000
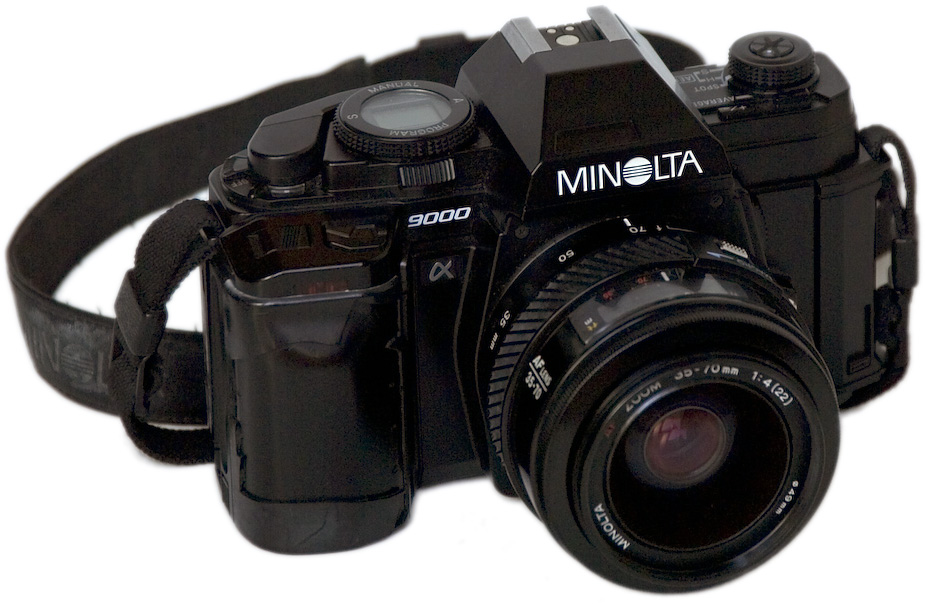

Overview
- Type: 35mm SLR

Lens
- Lens mount: Minolta A-mount

Focusing
- Focus: TTL phase detecting autofocus

Exposure/metering
- Exposure: Program, Aperture priority, Shutter priority and manual exposure; center-weighted and spot metering

Flash
- Flash: Hot shoe and PC-socket

General
- Dimensions: 53×92×139 mm (2.1×3.6×5.5 in)

The Minolta 9000 AF is a professional Single-lens reflex autofocus camera, introduced by Minolta in August 1985. It was both Minolta's and the world's first professional autofocus SLR. It was called Minolta Maxxum 9000 in the US and Minolta α-9000 in Japan.

As the first professional autofocus SLR system ever made, the Minolta 9000 AF sports a number of features showing the transition from electro-mechanical cameras to the next generation of fully electronic cameras.

== History ==
In the early 1980s, Minolta was developing several ranges of autofocus SLR cameras, with the Minolta 7000 aimed at the advanced amateur market, and the Minolta 9000 aimed at the professional market. Development on the Minolta 9000 was completed before that of the Minolta 7000, but for marketing purposes, the 9000 was held back and the 7000 was launched first in February 1985. For this reason, the 7000 is often considered to be the first ever autofocus-capable SLR (Note: Notwithstanding earlier SLRs retrofitted to incorporate autofocus capabilities such as the 1982/1983 Nikon F3AF; the poorly-performing Pentax ME F; and prototypes by Canon and Contax, such as the Yashica Contax 137 AF)

In any case, the Minolta 9000 AF was the first professional SLR system featuring a wide range of autofocus-capable accessories, with the New York Times calling it "The first 35-millimeter automatic-focusing camera built for professional use" and "revolutionary", and Leif Ericksenn, editor-in-chief of Photo Methods magazine calling it "one of the most astonishing cameras of the decade".

At the time of its introduction, the Minolta 9000 retailed for $684 (circa $1580 in 2017).

== Characteristics ==
The body of the Minolta 9000 is a robust all-metal construction, with the pentaprism being the only component not to be completely encased in metal. The shutter was capable of the then-extremely short exposure time of 1/4000 seconds, as well as of 1/250 second synchronisation.

The exposure meter provided the user with the usual range of automatic exposure modes: automatic, shutter priority, aperture priority and manual mode. As metering modes, it was capable of centre-weighted integral metering and spot metering; spot metering could be further refined with light and shadow corrections, which used an exposure memory to correct exposure by up to 2.3 EV. Furthermore, an optional back "program back super 90" (PBS-90) provided multi-spot measurements, with optional automatic weighting by average (AVERAGE), mean (CENTER), highlight (HIGHLIGHT) and shadow (SHADOW), as well as user-definable program curves. The backs also provided automatic bracketing.

The autofocus allowed not only quick focusing on static subjects, but also continuous focus.

The Minolta 9000 also accepted a variety of focusing screens, a lockable button for depth of field preview, lighting of the viewfinder and a built-in eyepiece to protect the eye of the photographer from lateral light.

The Minolta 9000 was compatible with Minolta AF accessories, including a full range of lenses in Minolta A-mount, flash units, and various other accessories such as a 5-frame/second motor winder, a 100-exposure magazine and several backs. One of these, available only in Japan, was a 0.38 mega-pixel digital sensor, called the "Still Video Back" ( SB-90 / SB-90S ), which recorded images on Video Floppies.

== Specifications ==
- Type: Fully automatic SLR camera body (exception: manual film advance) made of aluminium, brass and steel.
- Manufacturer: Minolta
- Year of launch: 1985
- Film: DX-coded 35mm film with speeds from 6 to 6400 ASA
- Lens mount: Minolta A-mount
- Focusing: TTL phase detecting autofocus
- Shutter: Aluminium focal plane shutter with speeds 30 sec. to 1/4000 sec.
- Metering: TTL through combined ambient and flash metering cells located at the bottom of the mirror box (therefore, not influenced by the focusing screens used), center-weighted or spot-metering metering characteristics for ambient light, center-weighted for flash light
- Exposure: Program controlled mode, manual mode, aperture priority or shutter priority mode
- Flash: PC-socket plus TTL-enabled hot shoe for Minolta AF-flashes, shutter synchronized for speeds up to 1/250 sec.
- Finder: Pentaprism finder, diopter correction, 94% coverage at 0.81x magnification
- Display: LCD displays on body and in the view finder
- Film advance: Manual lever and rewind crank, add-on winder (2fps, manual rewind) and motordrive (5fps, motorized rewind) units available
- Weight: 645 g (1.422 lb)
- Dimensions: 53×92×139 mm

== Sources and references ==
=== External links ===
Media related to Minolta 9000 at Wikimedia Commons

- Minolta Maxxum 9000 manual The unofficial Minolta 9000 information central
- Minolta 9000, cjo.info
- Minolta 9000, tammesphotography
- Minolta Maxxum 9000, tinkeringwithcameras
- CAMERA; NEW 35-MILLIMETER FOR PROFESSIONALS, John Durniak, The New York Times, 25 August 1985
- CAMERA; CANON HAS ENTERED THE HIGH-TECH AGE, John Durniak, The New York Times, 12 January 1986
- 70 years of Minolta, photoclubalpha.com
- 9000.org, Magnus Wedberg

=== Bibliography ===
- Minolta 9000, LA Mannheim, Munich, Laterna Magica 1986. ISBN 3-87467-304-9
- Minolta's camera technology. From the Nifacalette to Riva and Dynax, AR and J. Scheibel, G + G Urban 1990. ISBN 3-925334-47-5

This article was originally based on "Minolta 9000" in Camerapedia, retrieved at an unknown date under the GNU Free Documentation License.

Class	1985	1986	1987	1988	1989	1990	1991	1992	1993	1994	1995	1996	1997	1998	1999	2000	2001	2002	2003	2004	2005	2006
Higher flagship	9000 AF							9xi						9/9Ti								
Higher flagship																7						
Higher flagship																	7 Limited					
Lower flagship													800si									
Enthusiast	7000 AF				7000i																	
Enthusiast							8000i															
Enthusiast							7xi															
Enthusiast									700si													
Higher entry-Level		5000			5000i																	
Higher entry-Level								5xi														
Higher entry-Level										400si												
Higher entry-Level											500si			505si			5					
Higher entry-Level											600si classic			505si super								
Higher entry-Level																				70/60		
Lower entry-Level
Lower entry-Level					3000i																	
Lower entry-Level							3xi															
Lower entry-Level						2xi																
Lower entry-Level											300si				404si			4				
Lower entry-Level																			3			
Lower entry-Level																				50/40		
