= Nikon QV-1000C =

Filmless SLR camera model

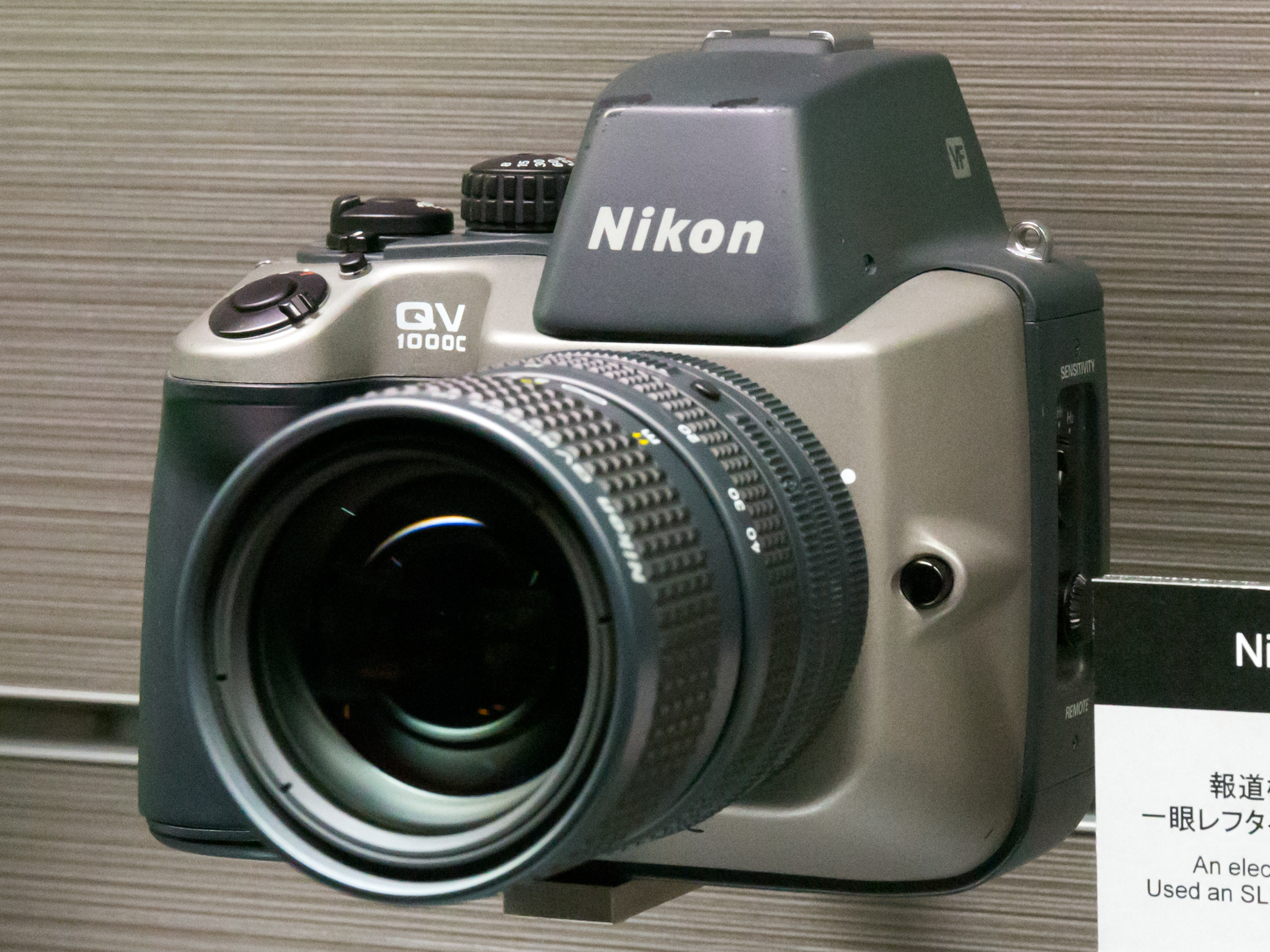
- Nikon QV-1000C from 1988

Overview
- Maker: Nikon
- Type: Analog filmless Single lens reflex camera
- Released: August 26, 1988
- Intro price: US$20,000

Lens
- Lens: Interchangeable, Bayonet-type Nikon QV-mount

Sensor/medium
- Sensor: 2/3 inch interline transfer, 380,000-pixel monochrome CCD
- Maximum resolution: 450 TV lines (horizontal) approximately
- Film speed: ISO equivalency 400, 800, 1600
- Storage media: magnetic 2-inch video floppy disk

Focusing
- Focus modes: Manual focus via split-image in the viewfinder
- Focus areas: TTL phase detection system using Nikon Advanced AM200 autofocus module

Exposure/metering
- Exposure modes: Programmed Auto [P]; Shutter-Priority AE [S]; Aperture-Priority AE [A]; Manual [M]
- Exposure metering: TTL full aperture center-weighted metering

Flash
- Flash: Hotshoe

Shutter
- Shutter speed range: 1/8 to 1/2000 sec
- Continuous shooting: 1/4/20 fps

Viewfinder
- Viewfinder: clear matte screen; 93% frame coverage; 0.7x magnification

General
- Battery: BP-60 quick-charge Ni-Cd battery (7.2V 600mAH)
- Optional accessories: QM-100 mount adapter
- Dimensions: 146×130×88 mm (5.7×5.1×3.5 in)
- Weight: 980 g (35 oz) (approximately without battery)
- Made in: Japan

The Nikon QV-1000C was the first filmless camera manufactured by Nikon. It was announced on August 26, 1988.

The camera had a 380,000 pixel CCD sensor, and stored analog black and white images (NTSC) on a magnetic two-inch video floppy disk.

It was targeted at press photographers who needed to quickly get photos to their newspapers that were good enough for newsprint; it was not sold to consumers. It allowed a journalist on location to take a picture and bypass the printing and scanning of the resulting image, transmitting a usable photo over a phone connection.

The camera was not sold by itself, but only as a complete package, which contained the camera body, two lenses (see below), the QV-1010T transmitter unit, QA-10 acoustic coupler, BP-60 Ni–Cd battery, QS-10D battery charger, VF-10 video floppy, QE-110 floppy disk eraser, and two carrying cases (hard and soft). It was originally sold for approximately US$20,000 (more than two million Japanese yen). The exact number of cameras produced is unknown, but it was in the range of 180–200.

The camera name came from "QV" for "Quick Vision", the "1000" has no specific meaning, and the trailing "C" is for "camera".

== History ==
Nikon gained knowledge on digital cameras (still video cameras with analog storage) by constructing the Nikon Still Video Camera (SVC) Model 1, a prototype which was first presented at Photokina 1986.

Beginning in 1988, the QV-1000C Still Video Camera was produced, mainly for professional press use. Both cameras used QV-mount lenses, a slightly smaller variant of the F-mount lenses.

A successor camera, the Nikon NASA F4, was one of the first cameras with digital storage.

== Image storage and transmittal ==
Images are stored in the camera on a two-inch video floppy disk. When a picture is taken, a still frame of an analog composite video is stored on the disk.

For transmittal, the disk is inserted into the QV-1010T transmitter unit, which outputs the signal through the video out port to the QA-10 acoustic coupler, which allows the signal to be sent over phone lines to the receiving end.

== QV lens ==
QV-Nikkor lenses were specialized lenses developed for the Nikon QV-1000C. These lenses used a dedicated 10-pin bayonet-type "QV-mount" to cover a 2/3-inch CCD sensor, with the 10-40mm f/1.4 and 11-120mm f/2.0 being the primary zoom lenses. The mount was smaller than the standard Nikon F-mount.

The optional QM-100 mount adapter was available to allow F-mount lens to be used on the camera.

The two QV lenses are shown in the following table:

Name	Focal length	Aperture	Zoom	Min focus distance	Filter size	Diameter	Length	Weight	E/G	Release date	Other
QV Zoom-Nikkor	10-40mm (roughly 40-160mm 35mm equiv)	f/1.4	2 ring manual	1.5 m (4.9 ft)	62 mm	70 mm (2.8 in)	94.5 mm (3.72 in)	550 g (19 oz)	15/11	September 1988	Macro function
QV Zoom-Nikkor	11-120mm (roughly 44-480mm 35mm equiv)	f/2.0	1 ring manual	1.1 m (3.6 ft)	82 mm	87 mm (3.4 in)	226 mm (8.9 in)	1,320 g (47 oz)	21/14	September 1988	Tripod attachment

== Awards ==
The QV-1000C was awarded with:

- the Japan Institute of Design Promotion 1989 Good Design Award.

== See also ==
- Nikon NASA F4

Sensor	Class	1999	2000	2001	2002	2003	2004	2005	2006	2007	2008	2009	2010	2011	2012	2013	2014	2015	2016	2017	2018	2019	2020	2021	2022	2023	2024	2025	2026
FX (Full-frame)	Flagship											D3X ^{−P}																	
FX (Full-frame)	Flagship										D3 ^{−P}		D3S ^{−P}		D4		D4S		D5^{T}					D6^{T}					
FX (Full-frame)	Professional											D700 ^{−P}			D800/D800E			D810/D810A			D850 ^{AT}								
FX (Full-frame)	Enthusiast																Df												
FX (Full-frame)	Enthusiast																	D750 ^{A}					D780 ^{AT}						
FX (Full-frame)	Enthusiast															D600	D610												
DX (APS-C)	Flagship		D1^{−E}	D1X^{−E}				D2X^{−E}		D2Xs^{−E}																			
DX (APS-C)	Flagship		D1^{−E}	D1H ^{−E}			D2H^{−E}	D2Hs^{−E}																					
DX (APS-C)	Professional				D100^{−E}				D200^{−E}		D300^{−P}		D300S^{−P}						D500 ^{AT}										
DX (APS-C)	Enthusiast						D70^{−E}		D70s^{−E}	D80^{−E}		D90^{−E}		D7000 ^{−P}			D7100	D7200			D7500 ^{AT}								
DX (APS-C)	Upper-entry								D50^{−E}	D40X^{−E*}	D60^{−E*}		D5000^{A−P*}		D5100^{A−P*}	D5200^{A−P*}	D5300^{A*}	D5500^{AT*}		D5600 ^{AT*}									
DX (APS-C)	Entry-level									D40^{−E*}			D3000^{−E*}	D3100^{−P*}		D3200^{−P*}	D3300^{*}			D3400^{*}		D3500^{*}							
Early models		SVC (prototype; 1986); QV-1000C (1988); NASA F4 (1991); E2/E2S (1995); E2N/E2NS (1996); E3/E3S (1998)																											
Sensor	Class																												
Sensor	Class	1999	2000	2001	2002	2003	2004	2005	2006	2007	2008	2009	2010	2011	2012	2013	2014	2015	2016	2017	2018	2019	2020	2021	2022	2023	2024	2025	2026
