= Sony Mavica =

Discontinued brand of Sony cameras

Mavica
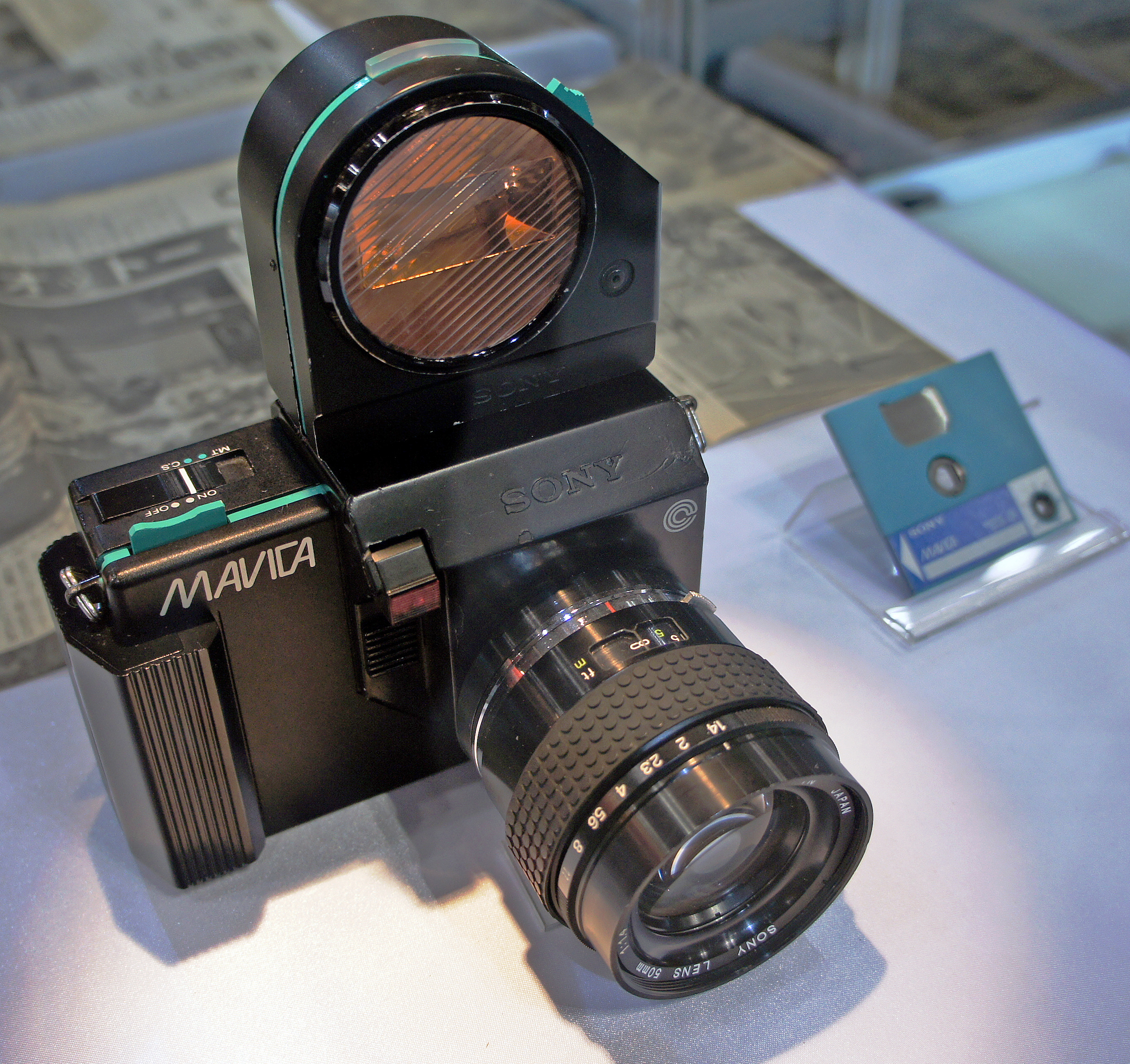
- Sony Mavica (1981), the first still video camera in history
- Type: Cameras (Electronic still video cameras / Digital still cameras)
- Inventor: Sony
- Inception: August 25, 1981 (Prototype unveiled)
- Manufacturer: Sony
- Available: Late 1980s
- Last production year: 2003
- Models: Analog (2.0" Video Floppy): MAVICA (1981), MVC-A7AF, MVC-C1, MVC-2000, MVC-A10, MVC-2010, MVC-5000, MVC-7000; Digital (3.5" Floppy Disk): MVC-FD5, MVC-FD7, MVC-FD51, MVC-FD71, MVC-FD81, MVC-FD73, MVC-FD83, MVC-FD88, MVC-FD91, MVC-FD85, MVC-FD90, MVC-FD95, MVC-FD75, MVC-FD87, MVC-FD92, MVC-FD97, MVC-FD100, MVC-FD200; Digital (8 cm Mini CD): MVC-CD1000, MVC-CD200, MVC-CD300, MVC-CD250, MVC-CD400, MVC-CD350, MVC-CD500; Capture adaptors: MVC-FDR1, MVC-FDR3
- Notes; Discontinued brand; replaced by the Cyber-shot and Alpha series.

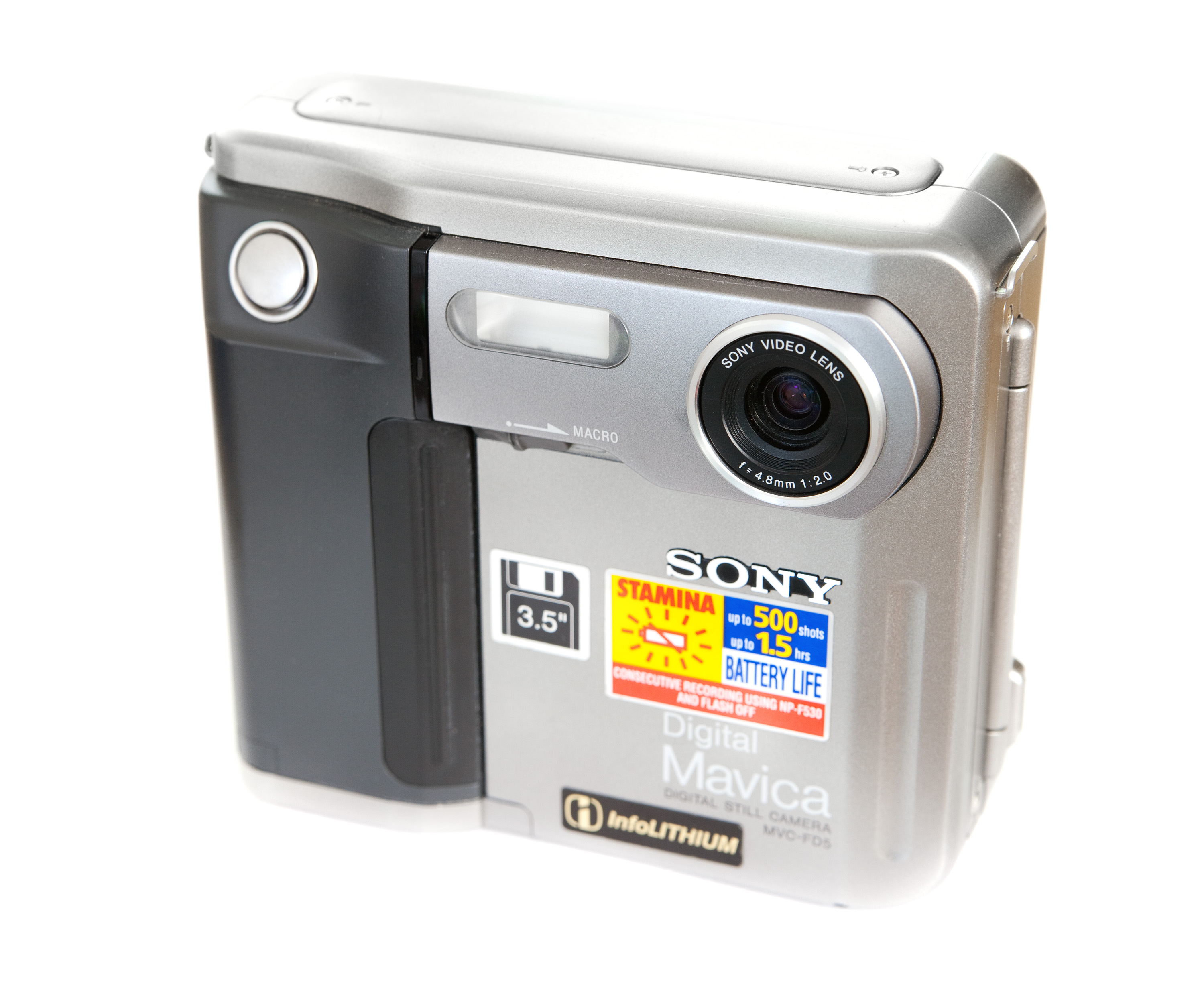
Sony Digital Mavica MVC-FD5 (1997), the first digital camera of the Mavica series

Mavica (Magnetic Video Camera) is a discontinued brand of Sony cameras which use removable disks as the main recording medium. On August 25, 1981, Sony unveiled a prototype of the Sony Mavica as the world's first electronic still video camera.

As with all Mavica cameras until the early 1990s (including later models sold commercially) this first model was not digital. Its CCD sensor produced an analog video signal in the NTSC format at a resolution of 570 × 490 pixels. Mavipak 2.0" disks (later adopted industry-wide as the Video Floppy and labelled "VF") were used to write 50 still frames onto tracks on disk. The pictures could be shown on a television screen, using a "special playback viewer unit" plugged into the television set.

During the late 1990s and early 2000s, Sony reused the Mavica name for a number of digital (rather than analog) cameras that used standard 3.5" floppy disk or 8 cm CD-R media for storage.

== Original analog Mavica models ==
The initial prototype demonstrated in 1981 supported video capture at ten pictures per second, and hopes were expressed that this could be increased to sixty pictures per second before the product was launched. Despite the lower image quality compared to traditional film, Japanese news professionals had reportedly been "plaguing the firm with requests for the camera" according to Sony, anticipating the potential convenience of handling pictures in a form that would be readily compatible with computing and telecommunications devices. Sony also demonstrated a thermal transfer printer called the Mavigraph, employing cyan, magenta, yellow and black dye-transfer sheets and capable of producing prints of up to 120 mm × 160 mm on A5 paper, made up of the 480 lines from the captured images, in a five-minute process.

The unreleased original MAVICA as well as the later ProMavica MVC-5000 and MVC-7000 were designed as single-lens reflex systems with interchangeable lenses. At least the ProMavica MVC-7000 also featured lens mount adapters for Nikon and Canon lenses. The VF format soon evolved into the backward-compatible Hi-VF format, supported by the ProMavica MVC-7000 and the Hi-Band Mavica models.

== Digital Mavica line ==
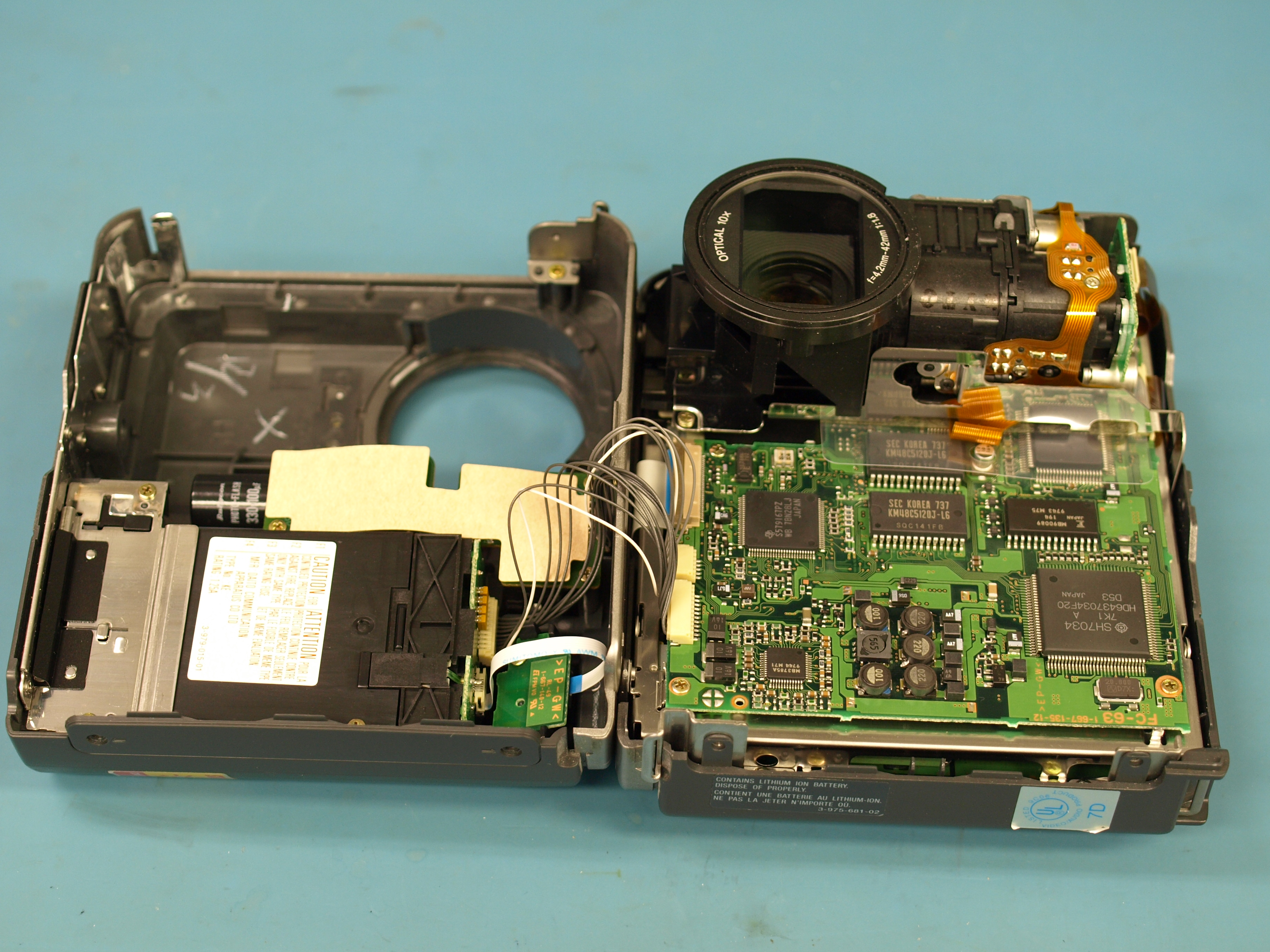
Inside the Sony Mavica MVC-FD7 Digital camera from 1997

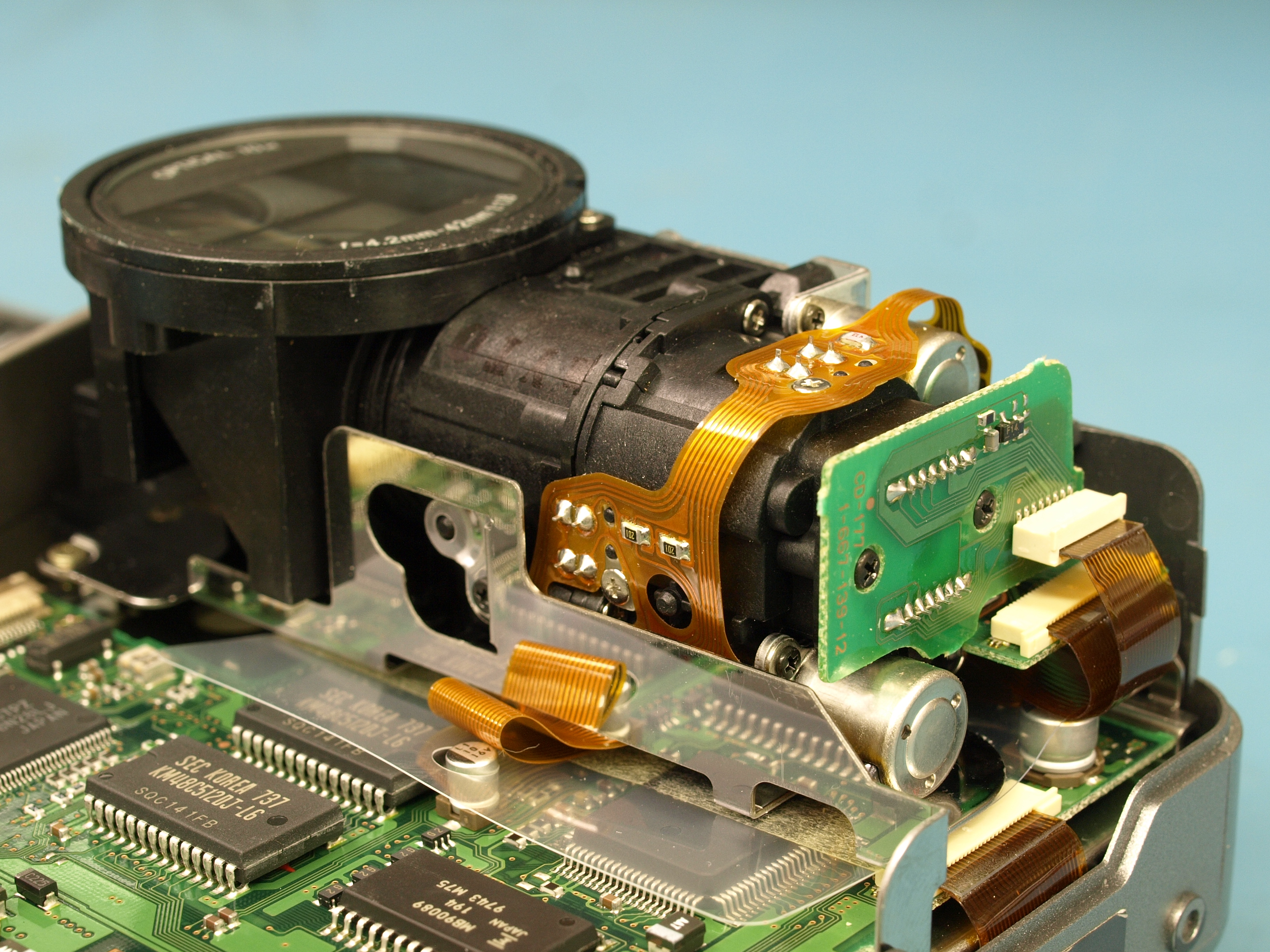
Sony Mavica MVC-FD7 x10 Lens Assembly. The 0.3M pixel sensor is on the right hand PCB. From 1997

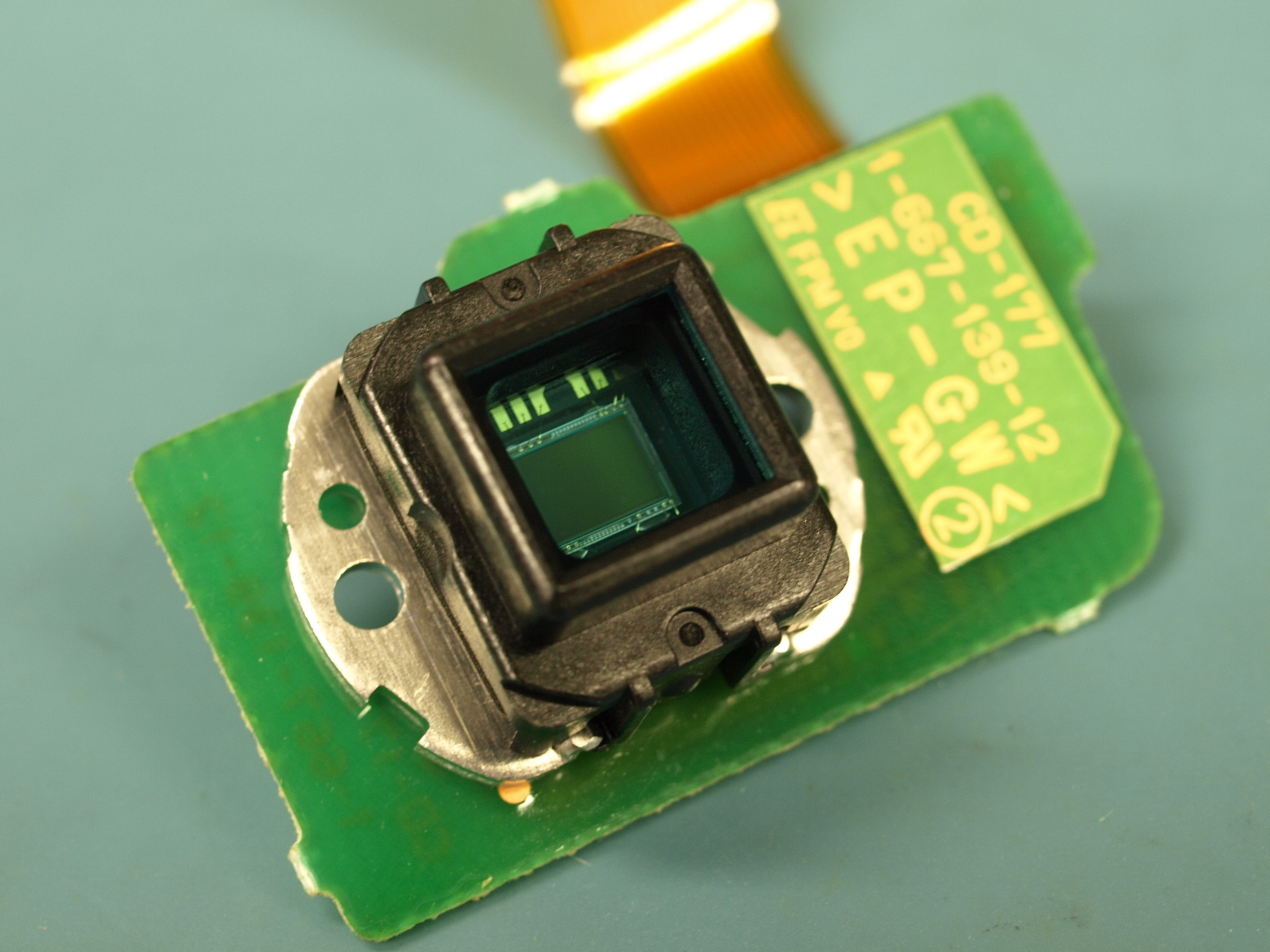
The 0.3 M pixel 640x480 sensor used in the Sony Mavica MVC-FD7 digital camera from 1997

From the late 1990s on, Sony released a number of cameras based on digital (rather than analog) technology under the "Digital Mavica", "FD Mavica" and "CD Mavica" brands.

The earliest of these digital models recorded onto 3.5" 1.4 MiB 2HD floppy disks in computer-readable FAT12 format, a feature that made them very popular in the North American market. With the evolution of consumer digital camera resolution (megapixels), the advent of the USB interface and the rise of high-capacity storage media, Mavicas started to offer other alternatives for recording images: the floppy-disk (FD) Mavicas began to be Memory Stick compatible (initially through a Memory Stick Floppy Disk adapter, but ultimately through a dedicated Memory Stick slot), and a new CD Mavica series—which used 8 cm (3") CD-R/CD-RW media—was released in 2000.

The first CD-based Mavica (MVC-CD1000), notable also for its 10× optical zoom, could only write to CD-R discs, but it was able to use its USB interface to read images from CDs not finalized (CDs with incomplete sessions). Subsequent models are more compact, with a reduced optical zoom, and are able to write to CD-RW discs.

A couple of the models were formed with a single lens reflex component combined with an interchangeable lens. And to give them flexibility, one or two versions also had lens mount adapters.

== Later Sony digital cameras ==
The Mavica line has been discontinued. Sony continues to produce digital cameras in the Cyber-shot and Alpha series, which use Memory Stick and other flash card technologies for storage.

== Mavica models ==
=== Still video cameras with storage on 2.0" video floppy ===
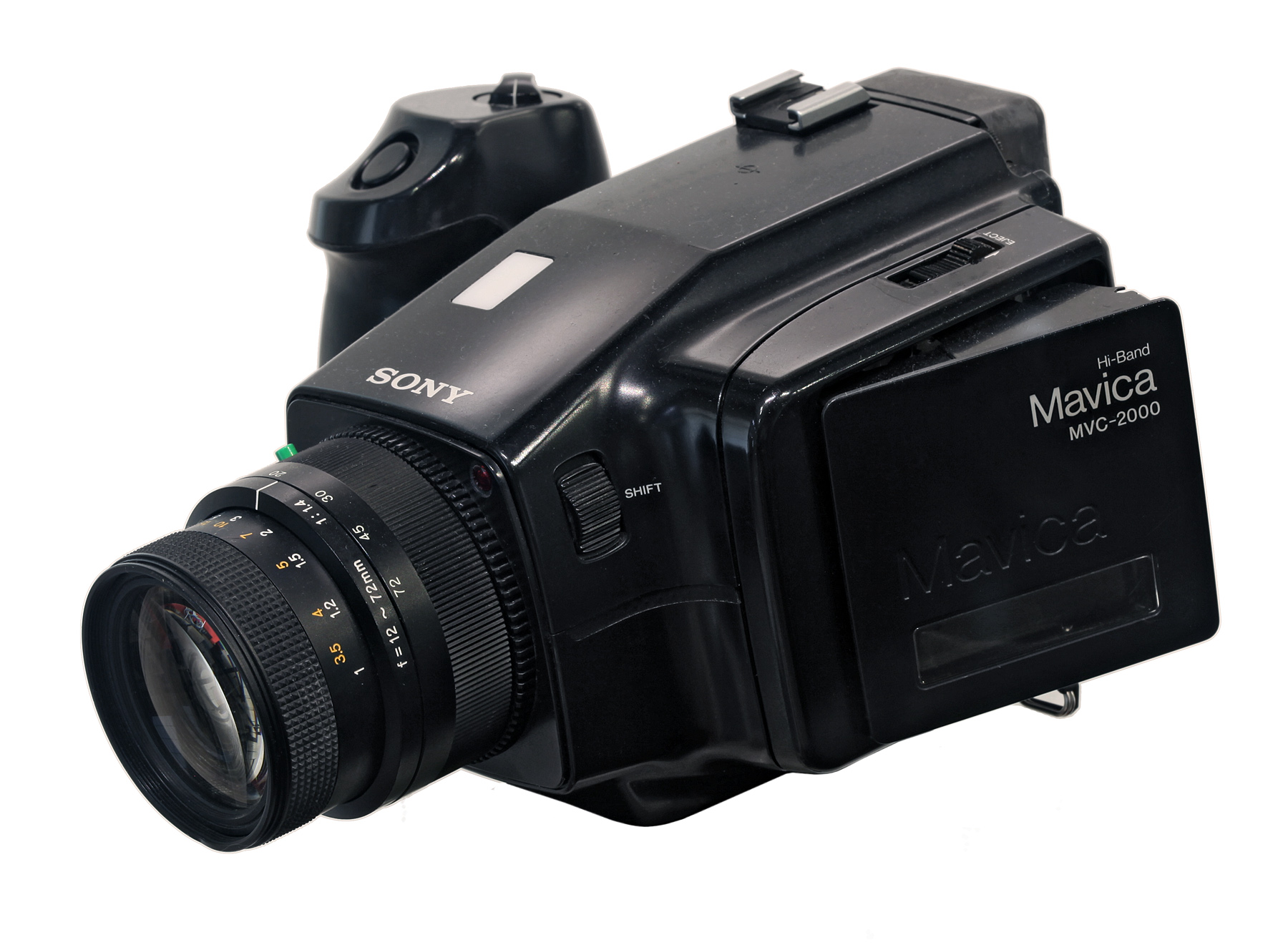
Mavica MVC 2000, an analog model from the late-1980s

- Sony MAVICA (1981) (Mavipak 2.0" VF, SLR design, 3 lenses, several prototypes)
- Sony Mavica MVC-A7AF (1987) (Mavipak 2.0" VF)
- Sony Hi-Band Mavica MVC-C1 (1988) (Mavipak 2.0" Hi-VF)
- Sony ProMavica MVC-2000 1989) (Mavipak 2.0" Hi-VF)
- Sony Hi-Band Mavica MVC-A10 (1989) (Mavipak 2.0" Hi-VF)
- Sony ProMavica MVC-2010 (1990) (Mavipak 2.0" VF Hi-VF)
- Sony ProMavica MVC-5000 (1990) (Mavipak 2.0" VF, SLR design, various lenses)
- Sony ProMavica MVC-7000 (1992) (Mavipak 2.0" Hi-VF, SLR design, 5 lenses, 2 lens adapters)

=== Digital still cameras with storage on 3.5" floppy disk ===
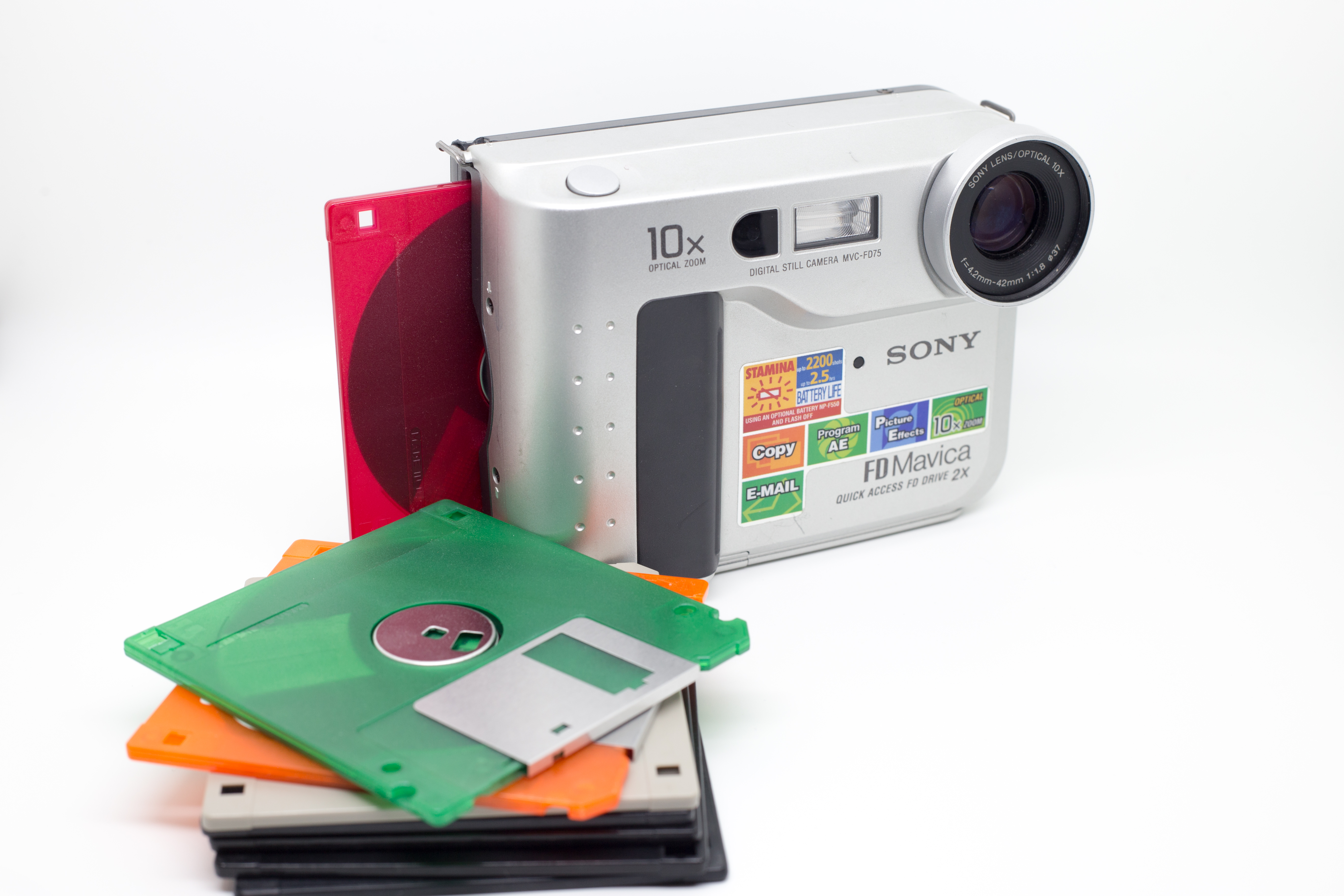
Sony Mavica MVC-FD75 with floppy disks

- Sony Digital Mavica MVC-FD5 (late 1997, early 1998, fixed focal length lens)
- Sony Digital Mavica MVC-FD7 (late 1997, early 1998, 10× optical zoom lens)
- Sony Digital Mavica MVC-FD51 (mid-1998, fixed focal length lens)
- Sony Digital Mavica MVC-FD71 (mid-1998, 10× optical zoom lens)
- Sony Digital Mavica MVC-FD81 (1998) (First Mavica cam capturing video in 162×112 for 60s, or 320×240 for 15s in 16fps, 1024×768 common images)
- Sony Digital Mavica MVC-FD73 (1999)
- Sony Digital Mavica MVC-FD83 (1999) (1024×768 still images, 320×240 @16fps MPEG-1 video up to 15s)
- Sony Digital Mavica MVC-FD88 (1999) (8× optical zoom, 1280×960 still images, 320×240 @16fps MPEG-1 video up to 15s))
- Sony Digital Mavica MVC-FD91 (1999) (14× optical zoom)
- Sony Digital Mavica MVC-FD85 (2000) (1280×960 still images, 320×240 @16fps MPEG-1 video up to 15s)
- Sony Digital Mavica MVC-FD90 (2000) (same as MVC-FD85 with upscaling, external flash jack, and manual focus available. 1280×960 still images (upscaling to 1472×1104), 320×240 @16fps MPEG-1 video up to 15s)
- Sony Digital Mavica MVC-FD95 (2000)
- Sony FD Mavica MVC-FD75 (2001) (10× optical zoom lens)
- Sony FD Mavica MVC-FD87 (2001) (6× digital zoom - 3× optical, 1280 × 960 image size max, 1.3 megapixel CCD)
- Sony FD Mavica MVC-FD92 (2001) (4× floppy)
- Sony FD Mavica MVC-FD97 (2001) (10× optical zoom, 4× speed diskette and Memory Stick slot, similar to MVC-CD1000)
- Sony FD Mavica MVC-FD100 (2002) (1.2 MP, 4× Floppy and Memory Stick)
- Sony FD Mavica MVC-FD200 (2002) (same as MVC-FD100 but 2MP)

=== Digital still cameras with storage on Mini CD (8 cm compact disc) ===
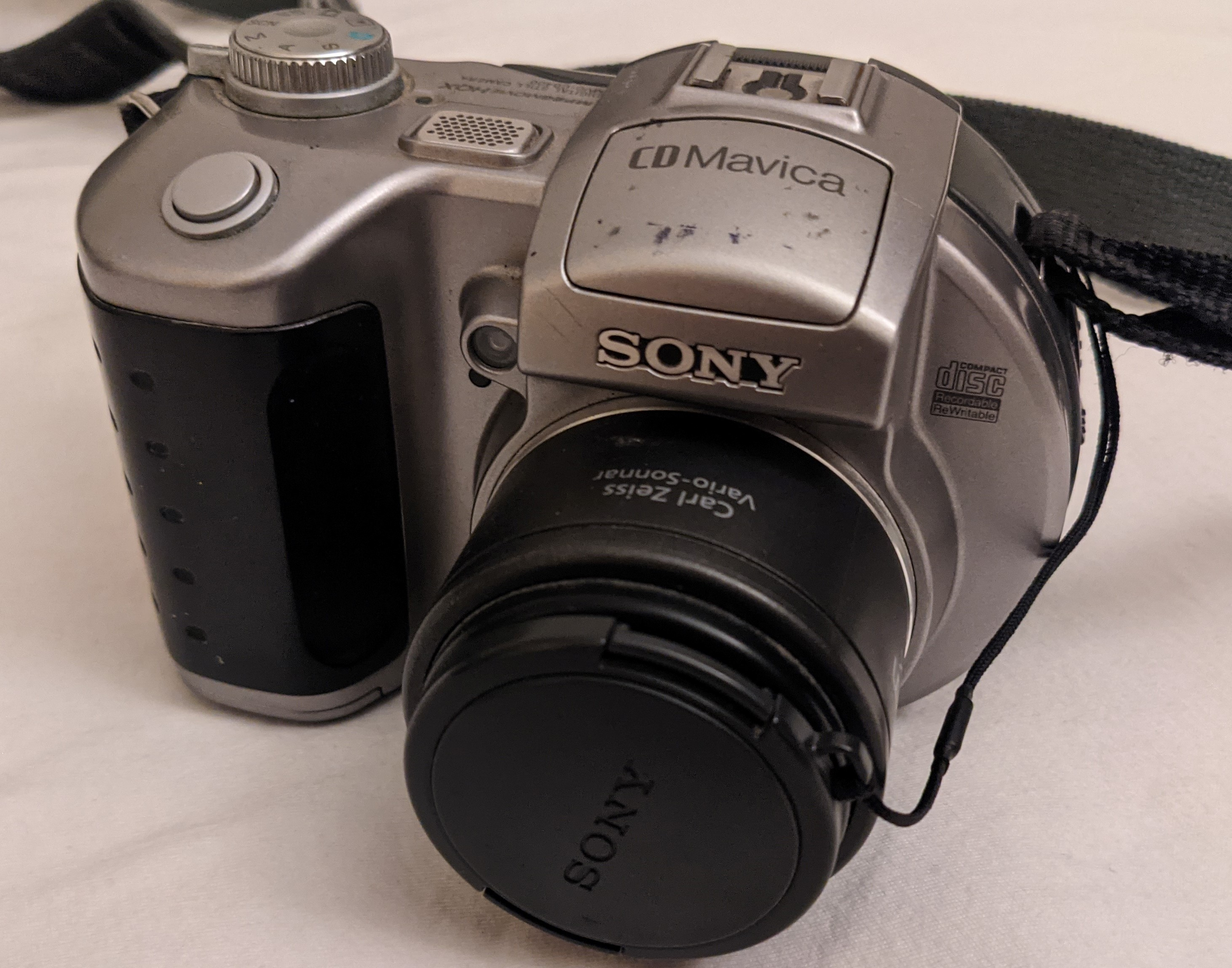
Sony Mavica CD400, front view

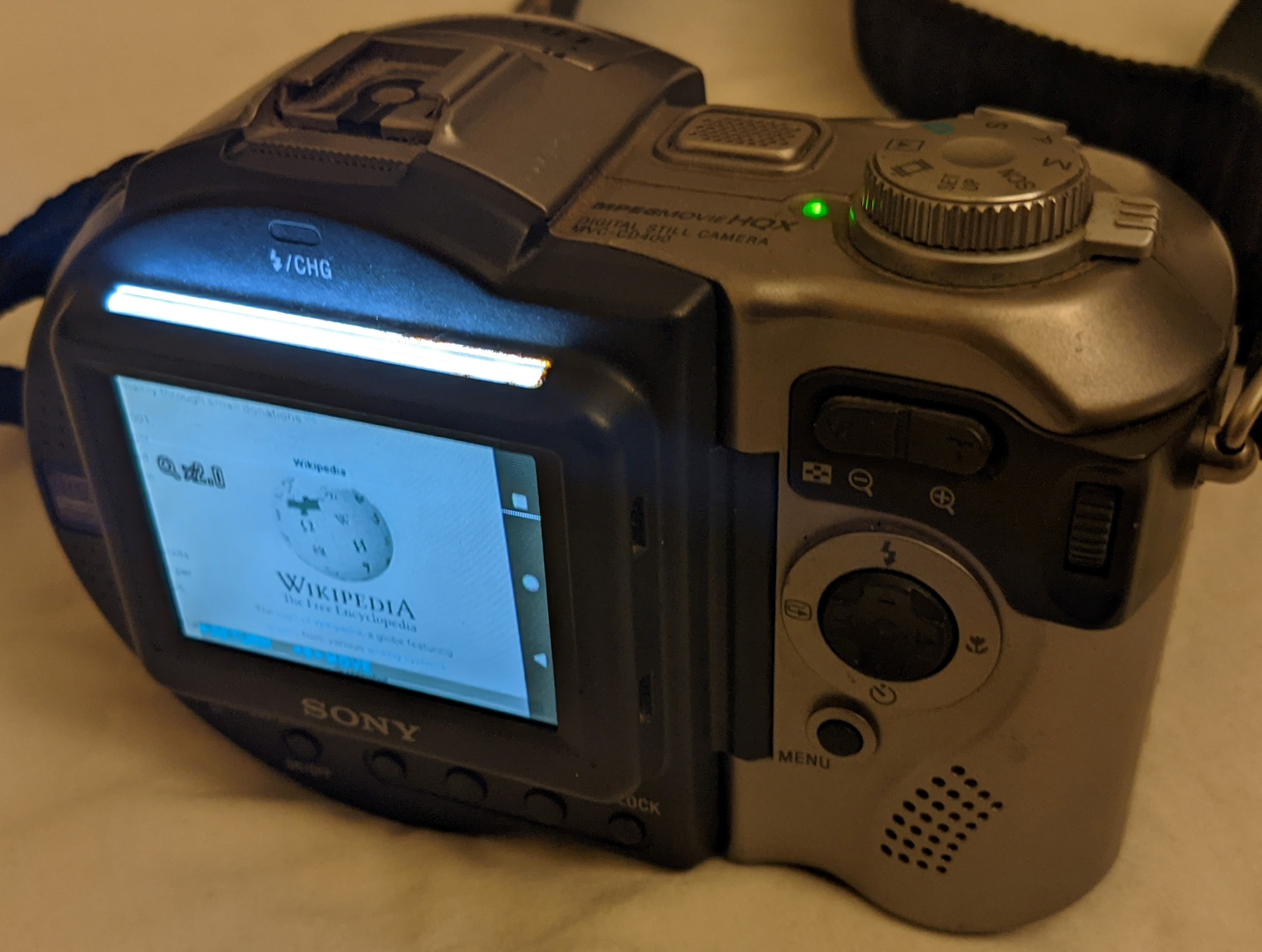
Sony Mavica CD400, rear view

- Sony Mavica MVC-CD1000 (2000)
- Sony CD Mavica MVC-CD200 (2001)
- Sony CD Mavica MVC-CD300 (2001)
- Sony CD Mavica MVC-CD250 (2002)
- Sony CD Mavica MVC-CD400 (2002) (First Mavica to use "Hologram AF" laser-assisted low-light autofocus)
- Sony CD Mavica MVC-CD350 (2003)
- Sony CD Mavica MVC-CD500 (2003)

=== MaviCap digital still image capture adaptors ===
- Sony MaviCap MVC-FDR1 (storage on 3.5" floppy)
- Sony MaviCap MVC-FDR3 (storage on 3.5" floppy)

== Cameras of similar concept ==
There were other digital cameras that used disk storage as memory media:

- Sony Hi-MD Photo MZ-DH10P, a digital camera/audio player that used Hi-MD MiniDisc-Format
- Panasonic PV-SD4090 and PV-SD5000, digital cameras that used SuperDisk (LS120).
- Iomega Zipcam a prototype digital camera shown at Comdex 1999 that used 100 MB Zip disks
- Agfa ePhoto CL30 Clik! Used Iomega's Clik! (later PocketZip) disk technology

== See also ==
- List of digital camera brands
- Memory card
- Microdrive
