= Video Floppy =

Video storage format

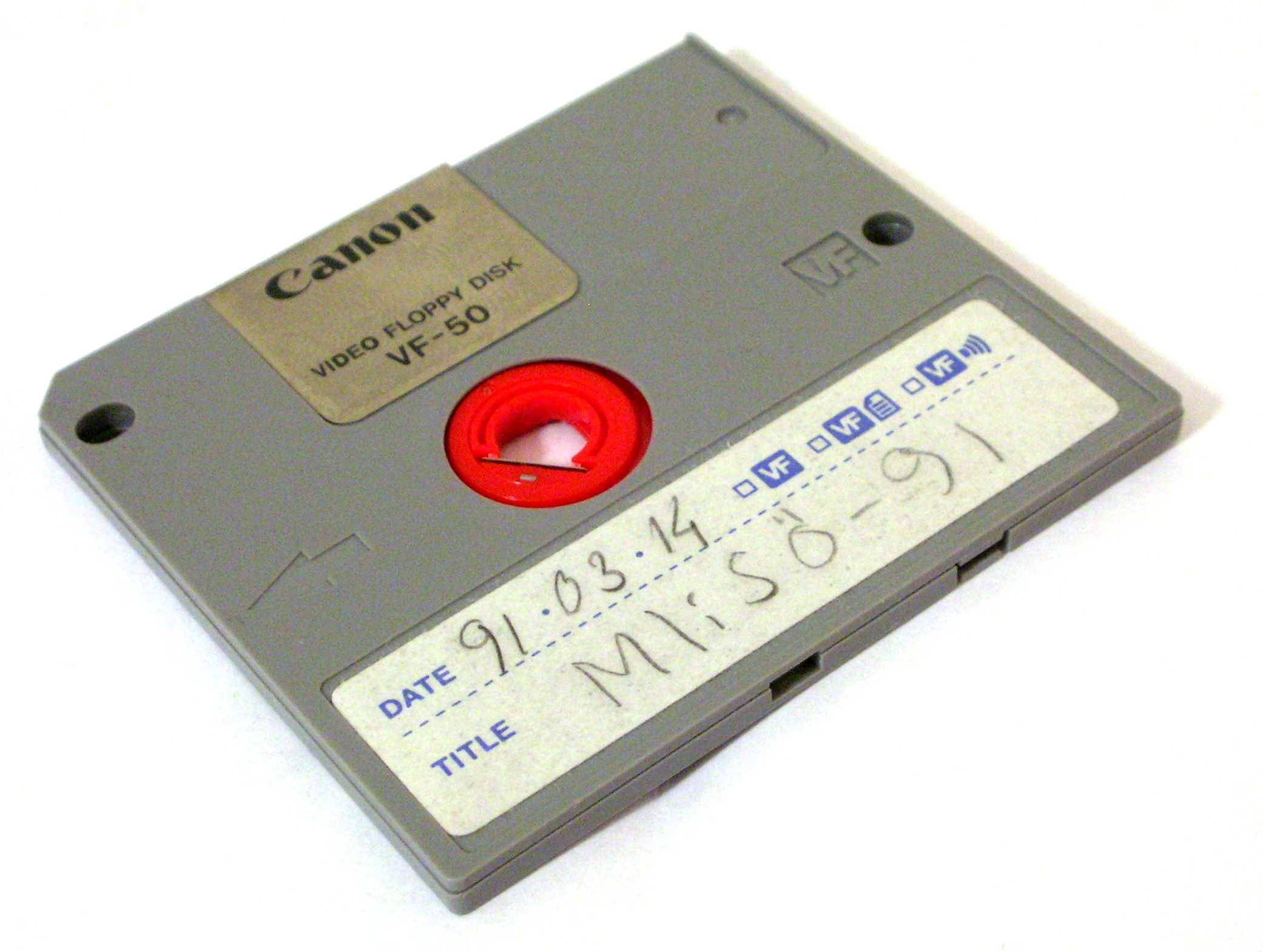
- A Video Floppy disk
- Encoding: NTSC, PAL, SECAM
- Standard: EIAJ CP-3901; BS EN 61122:1994
- Developed by: Sony

Video Floppy (bideo furoppi- (Japanese: ビデオフロッピー)), also known as VF disc and introduced under the "Mavipak" name, is an analog recording storage format for still video cameras. It consists of a 2-inch magnetic floppy disk used to store still frames of composite analog video.

A video floppy could store up to 25 frames either in the NTSC or PAL video standards, with each frame containing 2 fields of interlaced video. The video floppy also could store 50 frames of video, with each frame of video only containing one field of video information, recorded or played back in a "skip-field" fashion.

== History ==
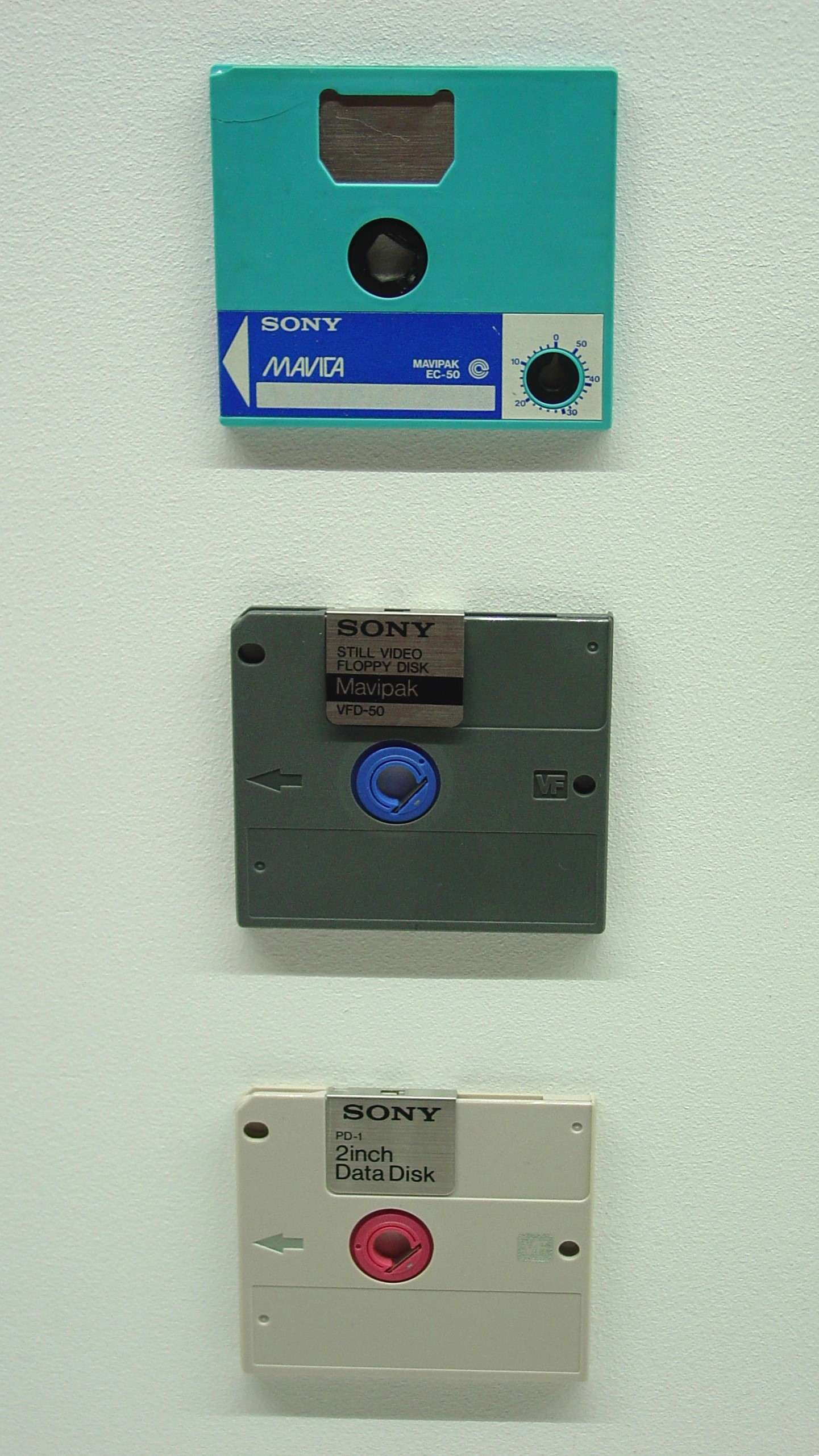
Prototype MAVIPAK, Production version Mavipak, 2inch Data Disk for PRODUCE

Video floppies were first demonstrated by Sony and introduced under the Mavipak name in 1981 for their prototype Mavica (not to be confused with their later line of Mavica digital cameras introduced in the mid-1990s, which stored JPEG images to standard 3.5-inch floppy disks readable by computers instead). The video floppy specification was proposed by the Electronic Still Camera Conference in 1985 and established as Standard CP-3901 (formerly CPZ-250) of the Electronic Industries Association of Japan (EIAJ) in September 1988. One month earlier, in August 1988, the Nikon QV-1000C was announced, which used a video floppy as its storage medium. The video floppy format was later used by Minolta, Panasonic, and Canon for their still video cameras introduced in the mid-to-late 1980s, such as the Canon Xapshot from 1988 (also known as the Canon Ion in Europe and the Canon Q-PIC in Japan).

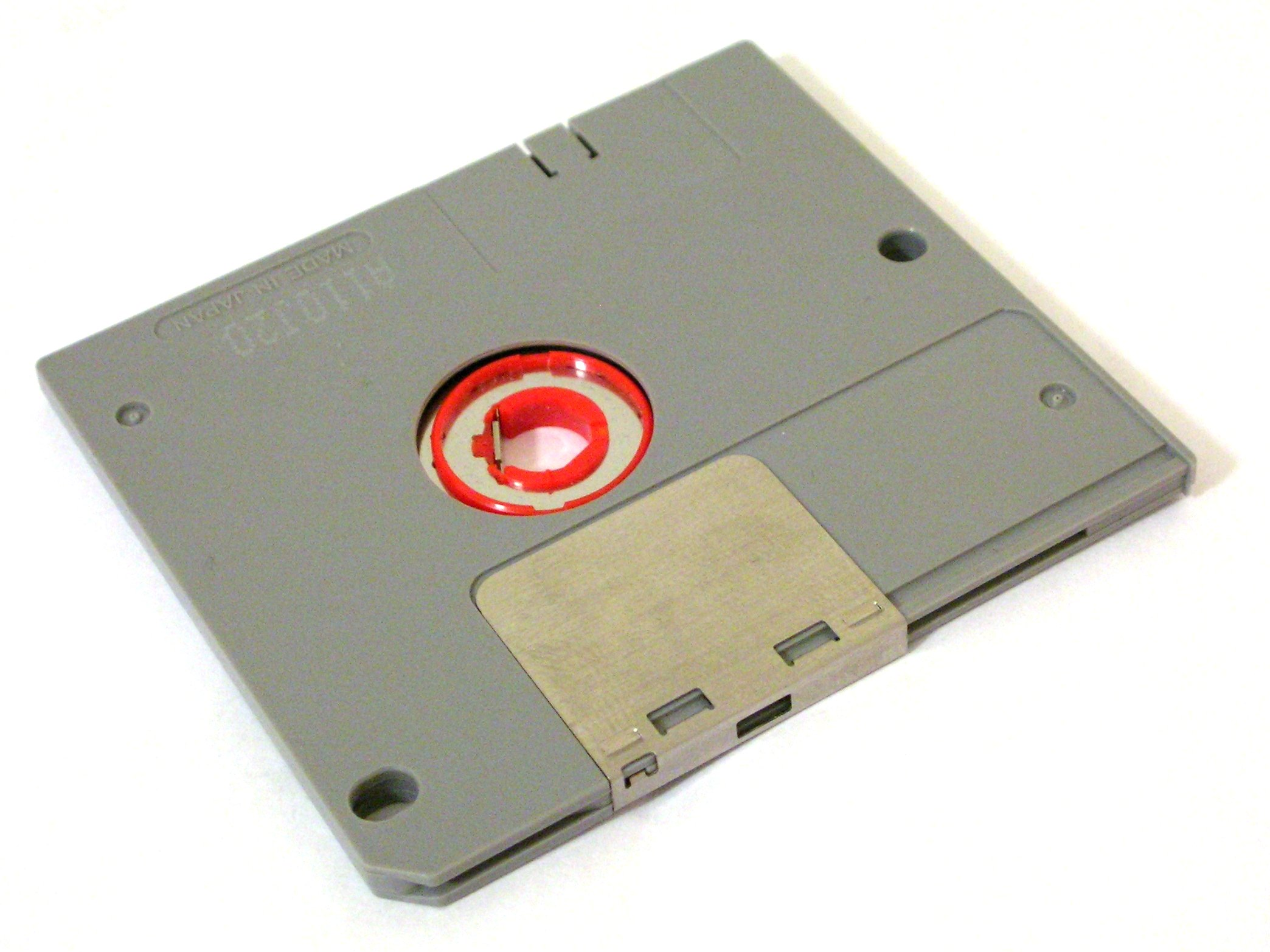
Reverse side of still video floppy

Besides still video cameras, stand-alone recorders and players were also available for the VF format, that could record from or output a composite video signal, to or from an external source (such as a video camera, VCR, video capture card, or computer graphics output). Some VF recorders also had the feature of recording a couple of seconds of audio that accompanied each video frame.

== Design ==
The recording media in a video floppy is a flexible magnetic disk 47 mm (1.9 in) in diameter and 40 μm (0.0016 in) thick. The disk is housed in a rectangular cartridge with one chamfered corner for orientation, measuring 60 mm × 54 mm × 3.6 mm (2.36 in × 2.13 in × 0.14 in); the cartridge is equipped with a sliding shutter for dust protection and a hub opening that is 15.9 mm (0.63 in) in diameter. The magnetic disc is divided into 52 coaxial tracks and rotates at either 3600 RPM to match the NTSC video field frequency (60 fields/second) or 3000 RPM for PAL and SECAM (50 fields/second) instead. The first track is encoded with a radius of 20 mm (0.79 in); each track is 60 μm (0.0024 in) wide with a track-to-track pitch of 100 μm (0.0039 in); the second track is recorded inboard of the first at a radius of 19.9 mm (0.78 in), and so on until the 52nd track is encoded with a radius of 14.7 mm (0.58 in). Track 51 is reserved as blank (without information), and Track 52 is used for a control signal.

The analog signal recorded to each track corresponds to a single field and includes three frequency-modulated waveforms: the luminance information, and red (R-Y) and blue (B-Y) color difference chrominance signals. Luminance is recorded between 6 MHz and 7.5 MHz (white peak); the R-Y signal has a center band of 1.2 MHz with a 0.7 MHz bandwidth and the B-Y signal has a center band of 1.3 MHz with a 0.5 MHz bandwidth. The Hi-Band format developed in 1988 shifts the luminance signal to between 7.7 and 9.7 MHz, improving the signal-to-noise ratio and resolution.

The patent for the data variant of the Video Floppy was filed by Ken Kutaragi and assigned to Sony Corporation. This patent describes a formatting scheme that allows the disk to record digital data. In this scheme, each track is divided into 4 angular sectors known as blocks, with each block spanning an angle of 90°. Within each block, there is a 4° gap to afford margin against overwriting the succeeding (or preceding) block, followed by a 1° interval reserved for a burst signal that states the recording density and indicates the disk is encoded with digital data. After the burst signal, a 64-bit index signal is used to record the data address (track and block information) along with a checksum signal. The remainder of the block is formatted into 128 distinct frames, each capable of recording 32 bytes, making the formatted capacity of the Video Floppy 800 Kbytes (50 tracks × 4 blocks/track × 128 frames/block × 32 bytes/frame).

== Other applications ==
The video floppy was used in multiple applications during the 1980s and 1990s. Many medical endoscopy and dentistry video systems, as well as industrial video borescopes & fiberscopes, used VF disks for storing video images for later playback and study. Standalone VF recorders & players were also used by television stations and video production studios as a still-store system for stills & graphics for use in a television production, or for on-air slides used for station identification or during technical difficulties (such as a "Please Stand By" still).

The video floppy was available as a data variant, which was sold as the Sony 2inch Data Disk PD-1 for use in its own PJ-100 "PRODUCE 100" word processor.The PRODUCE series began with the 100 and later included several other models, such as the 200, 300, 1000, 575, and 2000. A similarly sized disk was also used by the Zenith MinisPort laptop computer from 1989, digitally formatted for data storage. The MinisPort could store up to 793 KB of information on 2-inch LT format disks called LT-1. Video floppy and LT-1 are neither physically nor digitally compatible, so media can not be interchanged between drives using video floppy or LT standards.

An enhanced version of the VF format called Hi-VF was introduced in the late 1980s, providing higher resolution per video still than its predecessor. It used higher-bandwidth video recording, much like S-VHS as compared to VHS, or Hi8 compared to Video 8.

== See also ==
- Still video camera
- Floppy disk
