= Meridiani Planum =

Equatorial plain on Mars

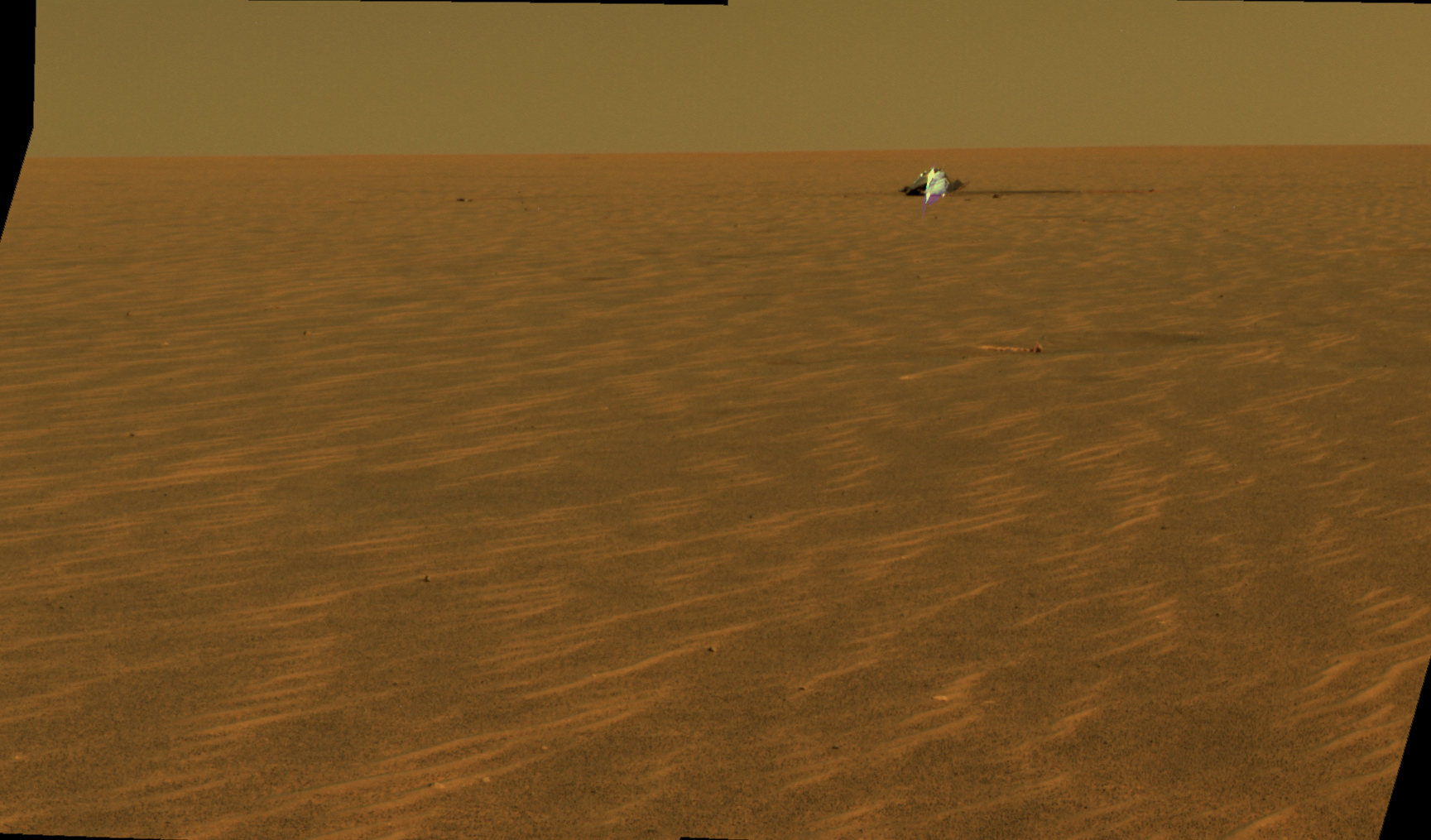
- Mars Exploration Rover Opportunity looks across the smooth soil of Meridiani Planum, towards the discarded heat shield of the rover's lander
- Feature type: Plains
- Coordinates: 0°2′S 3°8′W
- Diameter: ~1 060 km
- Eponym: Latin merīdiānus

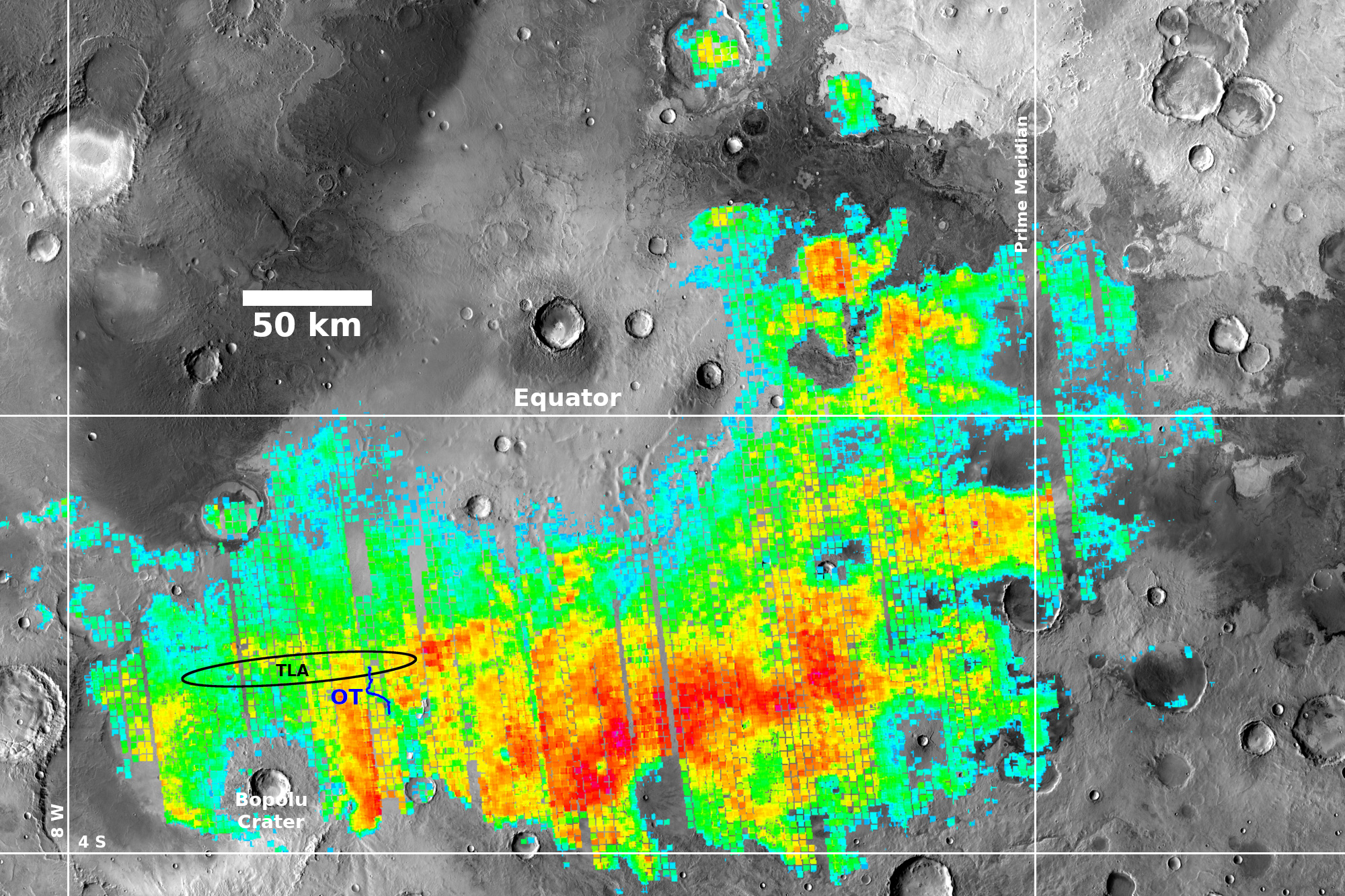
Map of surface hematite at Meridiani Planum detected from orbit.

Meridiani Planum (alternatively Terra Meridiani) is a large plain straddling the equator of Mars. The plain sits on top of an enormous body of sediments that contains bound water. The iron oxide in the spherules is crystalline (grey) hematite (Fe_{2}O_{3}).

The Meridiani Planum is one of the most thoroughly investigated regions of Mars. Many studies were carried out by the scientists involved with NASA's Mars Exploration Rover (MER) Opportunity. Two outstanding features found by these investigations are the actions of water flow and aqueous chemistry in this plain's geological history and, particularly specific to the plain, an abundance and ubiquity of small spherules composed mainly of grey-hematite that sit loosely on top of the plain's soils and underneath embedded inside its sediments. The loose surface spherules were eroded out of the sediments. They are informally called "blueberries". The plain's sediments have extremely high sulfur content (as sulfates) and high phosphate levels.

The boundaries of the Meridiani Planum are not firmly fixed and accepted by the community of Mars planetary scientists. However, the boundaries of the hematite-bearing plain were operationally defined in the late 1990s and early 2000s by the extent of the orbital detection of the plain's surface hematite by the thermal emission spectrometer (TES) on the satellite Mars Global Surveyor. The various names for this region (i.e., Terra Meridiani, Meridiani Planum) started to be used in the published literature in 2002/2003/2004. Each name reflects the coincidental (somewhat arbitrary) fact that the plain straddles the prime meridian for the system of longitude lines introduced for east/west Mars mapping.

The area covered by the detected surface hematite is around 150,000 km^{2}, i.e., larger than Lake Superior (82,000 km^{2} (32,000 sq mi)) in North America. Except for transport by large meteor impact, loose surface spherules tend to remain within a few meters of their starting embedded location. The surface hematite spherules and sediments are coextensive in surface area. So, the area extent of the underlying sediments is at least as large as the area of detected surface hematite spherules but likely somewhat larger since, for example, a significant area of surface hematite was covered by ejecta from the Bopolu Crater impact. The typical depth of the underlying sediments is several hundred meters. The Meridiani plain's sediments overlay older geological formations that appear around the sediments' boundary. The plain's sediments and surface hematite spherules were formed in three geological epochs and by three different sets of geological processes (more below).

The MER Opportunity rover investigated the rim of Endeavour Crater from August 2011 until the rover's demise in 2018. The plain's sediments do not cover this crater rim and are geologically younger than this rim. As such, the rim of Endeavour Crater is distinct from the plain, although it is surrounded by the plain and its sediments.

== 19th Century maps ==
The Meridiani Planum was first observed as part of a larger region that appeared as a distinct dark (low albedo) spot in small telescope images of Mars. Around 1830 the earliest Mars map-makers, Johann Heinrich von Mädler and Wilhelm Beer, chose to place the prime meridian for maps of Mars through this dark spot. In the late 1870s, Camille Flammarion called this dark region Sinus Meridiani ("Meridian Bay"). The Meridiani Planum covers the western part of the Sinus Meridiani.

== Viking 1 and Viking 2: Smooth terrain, sediments, water ==
The Viking 1 and Viking 2 missions successfully landed the first landers on Mars at locations far away from the Meridiani Planum. However, both missions also included satellites (operating between 1976 and 1982) that took many images of the surface of Mars from orbit. Viking 1 and Viking 2 satellite images of what is today called the Meridiani Planum (and its adjacent regions) were studied in three works in the 1980s and again in two 1997 papers published in the months between the launch of the Mars Global Surveyor mission and its arrival at Mars. Edgett and Parker noted the smooth terrain of what we now call the Meridiani Planum and realized early that the plain was likely made of sediments and probably had a wet, watery past.

== Strategy impacting the exploration of Meridiani Planum: Search for water and life ==
In the 1990s, NASA officials, especially Daniel S. Goldin, wanted to delineate a framework for "faster, better, cheaper" exploration of Mars. In this context, the "Water Strategy" was outlined in 1995/1996. The "Water Strategy" was "to explore and study Mars in three areas: - Evidence of past or present life, - Climate (weather, processes, and history), - Resources (environment and utilization)." All three areas were seen as intimately connected to water. High priority goals for NASA in the mid-1990s were to gather some evidence for surface water using satellite surveys and to land robotic rovers on the surface to collect detailed local evidence of water and signs of life.

== Global satellite surveys: Surface hematite and water ==
Two NASA missions arrived at Mars in mid-1997: Mars Pathfinder and Mars Global Surveyor. Mars Pathfinder made the first successful Mars landing in over twenty years and the first-ever deployment of a Mars rover, the small, short-lived Sojourner. Mars Global Surveyor surveyed most of the surface of Mars to map its surface topography, some mineral distributions, and make some other measurements.

=== Hematite, water, plain, life potential: A place to land a rover ===
An important survey carried out between 1997 and 2002 by the Mars Global Surveyor collected surface hematite levels with the satellite's thermal emissions spectrometer (TES). The TES hematite survey data was turned into the low-resolution map shown in Figure 1a. This map, covering all of Mars, has just one large spot covering a region with high hematite levels. This green, yellow, and red spot straddles the equator and the prime meridian in the middle of Figure 1a. A higher resolution image of the high-hematite region is shown in Figure 1b.

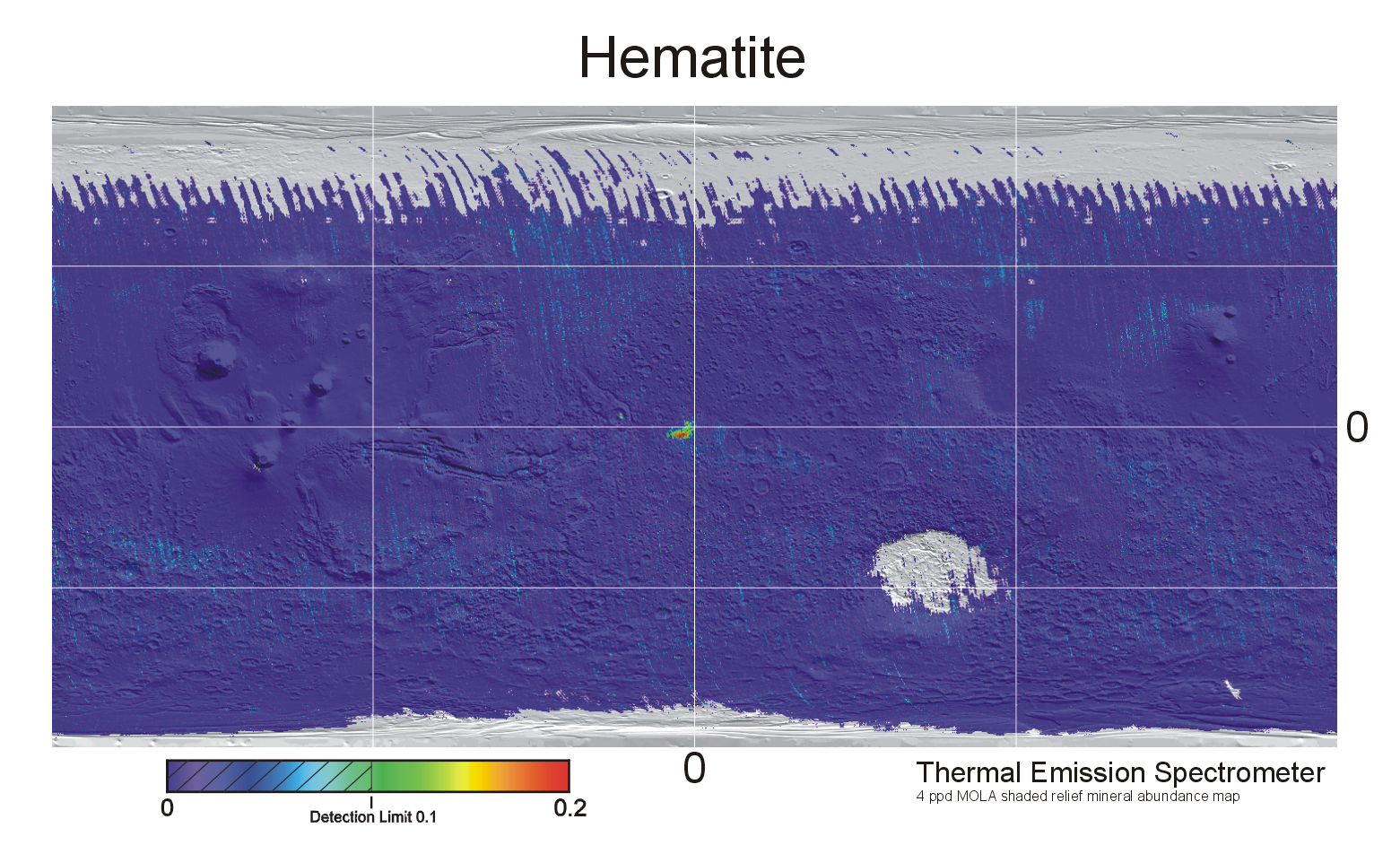
Figure 1a. A low-resolution map across all of Mars of surface hematite levels. Data for this map was produced by the thermal emission spectrometer (TES) on the Mars Global Surveyor between 1997 and 2002. The green and red blob in the center of the map is shown in high resolution in Figure 1b. Mapped from 1997 to 2002.

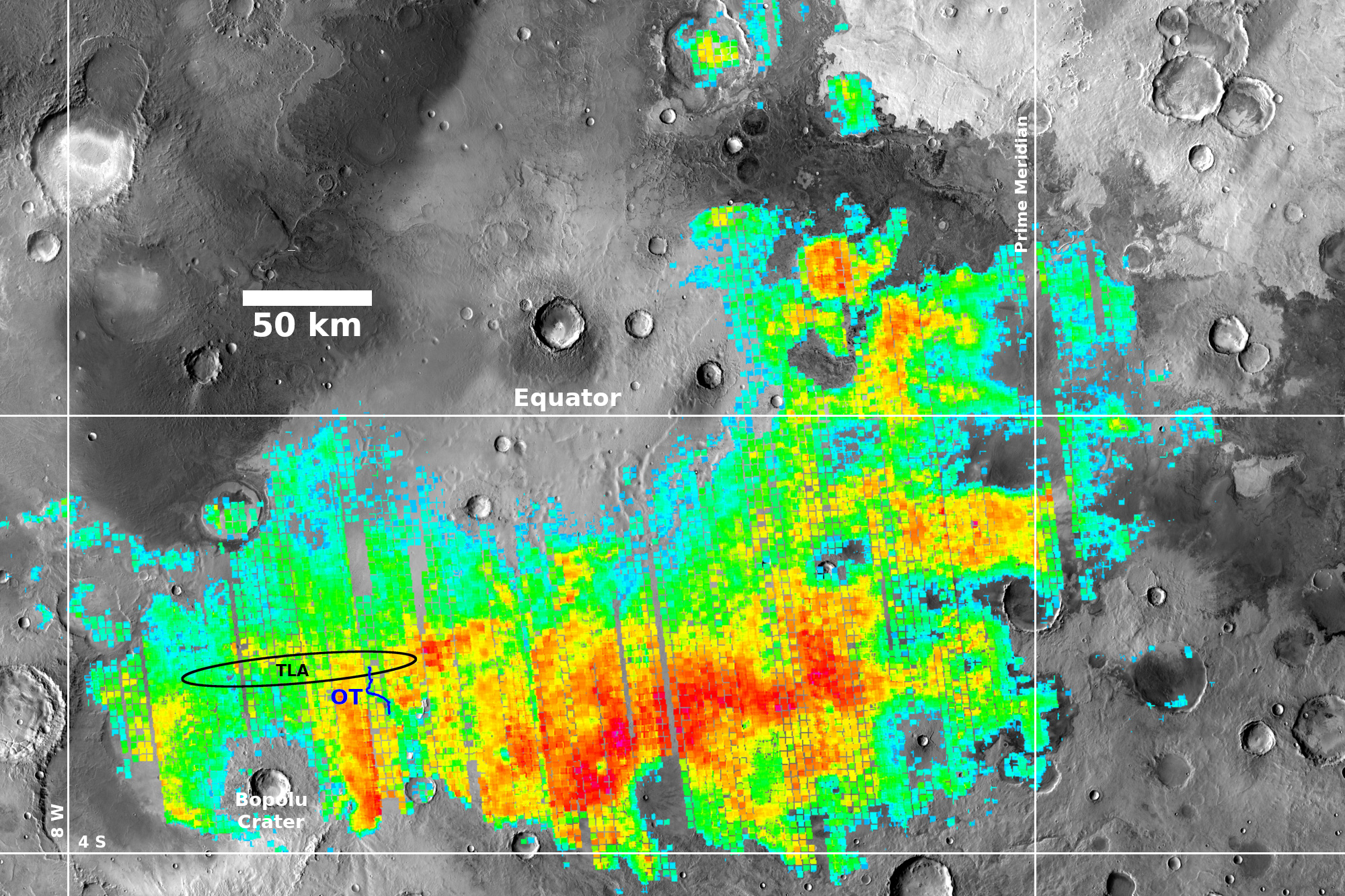
Figure 1b. Map of surface hematite levels on Meridiani Planum. This is a high-resolution blow-up of the central part of Figure 1a overlaid over an image of the region. Mapped from 1997 to 2002.

In early the 2000s, the hematite map of Figure 1b and the confirmation (from the topography mapping done by the Mars Global Surveyor) that this area is a flat plain and relatively easy to land on were the decisive pieces of evidence for choosing the Meridiani Planum as one of the landing sites for NASA's two bigger Mars Exploration Rovers (MERs), named Opportunity and Spirit. The decisiveness for NASA of the hematite map of Figure 1b for choosing the landing site for Opportunity was due to the fact that NASA was using high hematite levels as proxy evidence for large amounts of liquid water flowing in the region in the past (hematite only forms in the presence of liquid water in geological settings). In 2003, this high-hematite region was a high-priority place to start to search for signs of life on Mars.

=== Present day water at Meridiani Planum (satellite evidence) ===
Since 2001, evidence for water at the present-day Meridiani Planum was collected by the High Energy Neutron Detector (HEND) mounted on the Mars Odyssey orbiter. This neutron detector collects signals of "water-equivalent hydrogen" (WEH) over the entire planet. It gradually built up global maps of surface WEH. These maps show that polar and near-polar regions of Mars have the highest levels of surface WEH; although, the Meridiani Planum has relatively high WEH for a non-polar region. The WEH maps are likely to underestimate the present-day water resources at Meridiani Planum since (a) the HEND has a shallow (1 m) penetration depth, (b) the majority of the plain's surface is covered in dehydrated soils, and hematite spherules.

== Starting missions: Opportunity rover and other landers ==
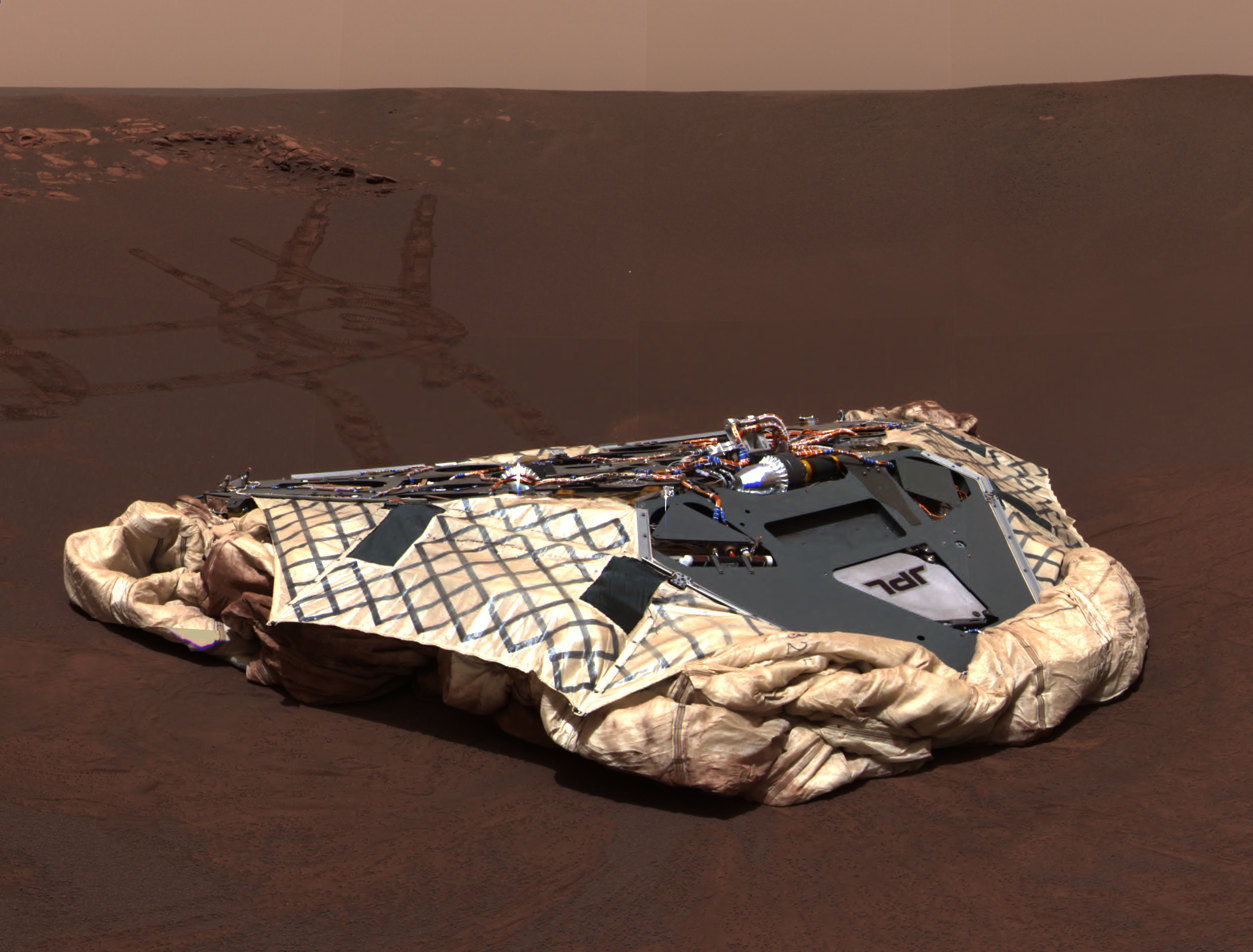
The unfolded, empty lander for the rover Opportunity after completing the "hole-in-one" landing inside Eagle Crater.

Starting with Daniel S. Goldin's strategies and NASA's engineering attention to detail, Mars Exploration Rover Opportunity successfully made the "hole-in-one" landing into Eagle Crater at Meridiani Planum on January 24 (PST), 2004. NASA named this landing site the Challenger Memorial Station to honor the final crew of the Space Shuttle Challenger, who died in 1986 when that shuttle broke up in flight.

The Meridiani Planum was also the target landing site for two other missions: Mars Surveyor 2001 Lander and Schiaparelli EDM. However, these other two lander missions were not successful. The Mars Surveyor 2001 Lander was canceled after the failures of the Mars Climate Orbiter and Mars Polar Lander missions, while the Schiaparelli EDM (Entry, Descent, and Landing Demonstrator Module) system lost control during the descent stage and terminally crash-landed on October 19, 2016. (Schiaparelli EDM was part of the ExoMars program of the European Space Agency.)

== Opportunity's traverse ==
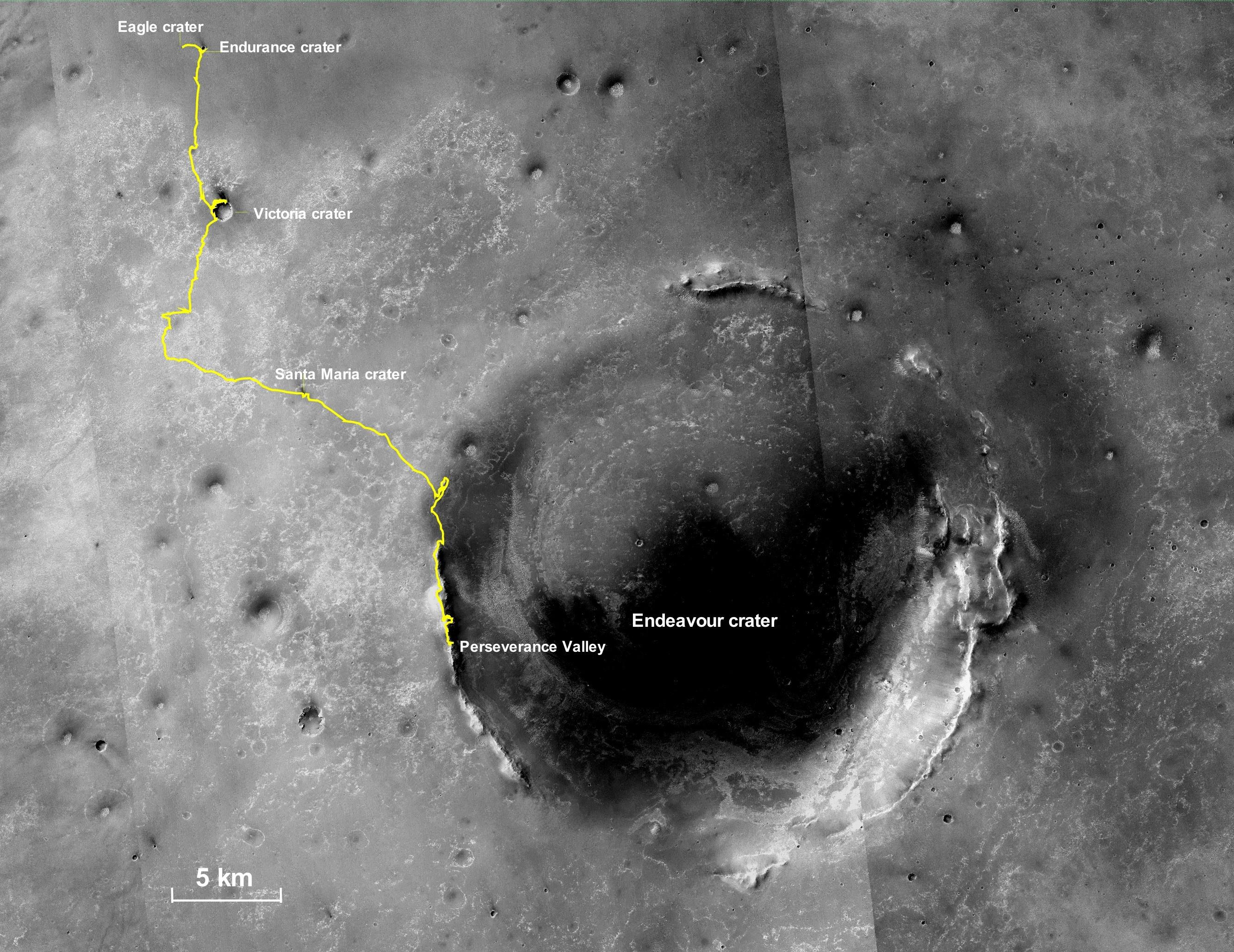
Figure 2. Opportunity's Traverse Map

Opportunity traveled 28.06 miles (45.16 kilometers) across the Meridiani Planum and around the rim of Endeavour Crater between January 2004 and June 2018. Figure 2 highlights the rover's traverse route (yellow line). The route's position within the Meridiani Planum is shown by the blue line traverse route labeled "OT" in Figure 1b. The journey started on January 25, 2004, with the landing in Eagle Crater. The rover crossed the plain's sediments and soils and studied many small and medium-sized craters until August 2011, when it reached the rim of the enormous Endeavour Crater. Between August 2011 and June 10, 2018, it studied the rim of Endeavour (which has different geological features from the plain). The rover's last communication with NASA was on June 10, 2018. The Opportunity mission was declared ended on February 13, 2019.

== Opportunity's human-like (Pancam) view of Meridiani Planum ==
The Opportunity rover had five cameras. One, the Pancam (panoramic cam), was mounted at the height of 1.5 m, i.e., a height similar to the eye height of most people. The Pancam was used to take scientific data, and it also took images that were approximate true color (ATC) photographs of the rover's surroundings; that is, the Pancam photographed images close to what people would see if standing in the rover's place. The following pictures, Figure 3 through Figure 10, provide a selection of images that cover the common and outstanding features a person would see standing at locations along Opportunity's traverse of the Meridiani Planum.

=== The wide view: A flat plain with smooth or ripple soils ===
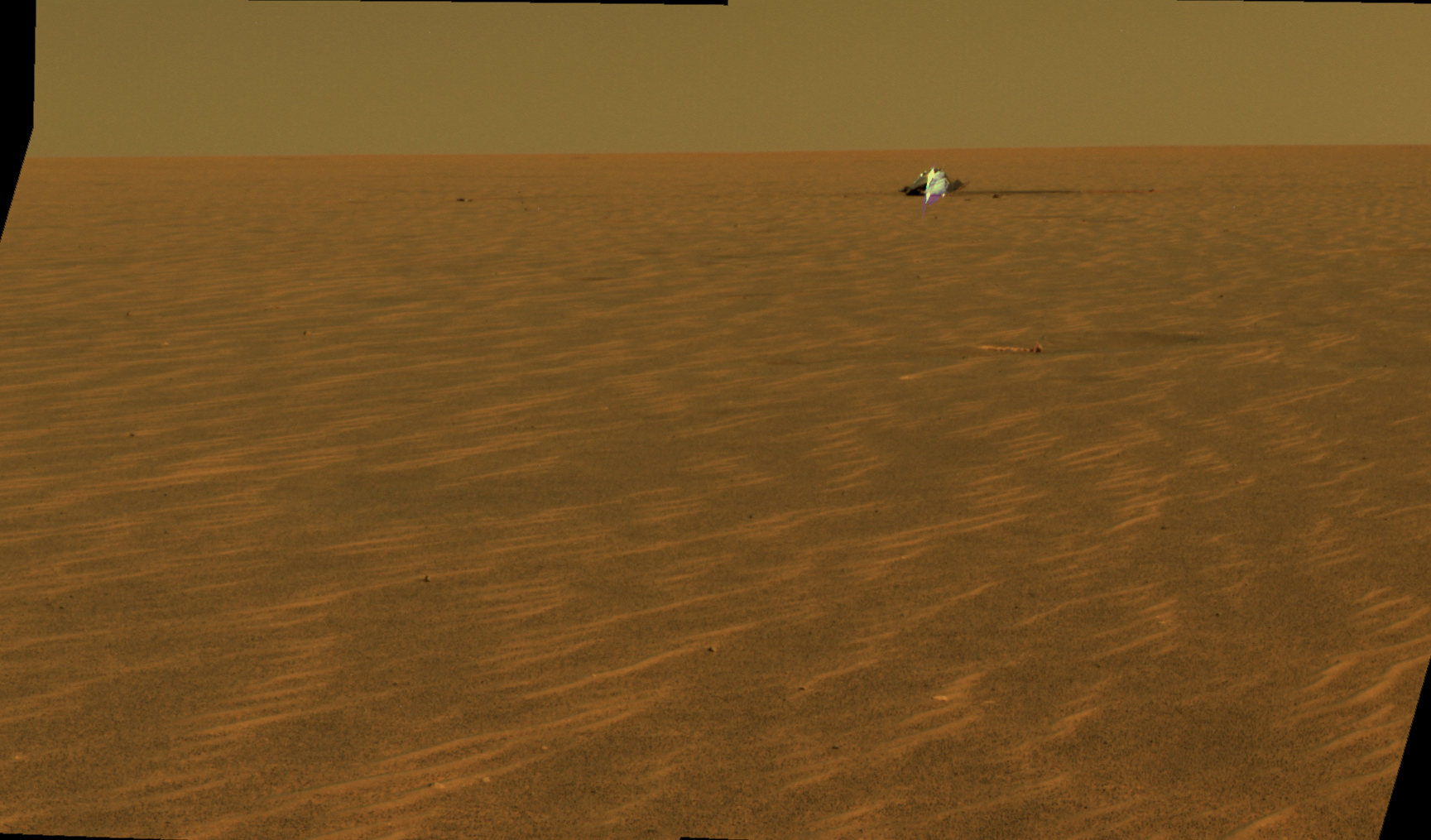
Figure 3. The plain at a field of "smooth sandy surface" soils. Fields of smooth sandy soils can cover many square kilometers. The discarded, shiny heat shield of Opportunity's lander sits at the image's center mid-ground. The blue/grey tint of the smooth sheets comes from many grey hematite spherules covering the soil. Fields of smooth shandy soils are so remarkably smooth that 1 cm tall "crest ripples" stand out. Crest ripples are the sinuous lines in the figure. They are made of fragments of spherules (see Figure 21 for close-ups). Most of the region from Opportunity's start at Eagle Crater to Victoria Crater was covered in smooth sandy soils. Image taken on Sol 322 (2004-12-19).

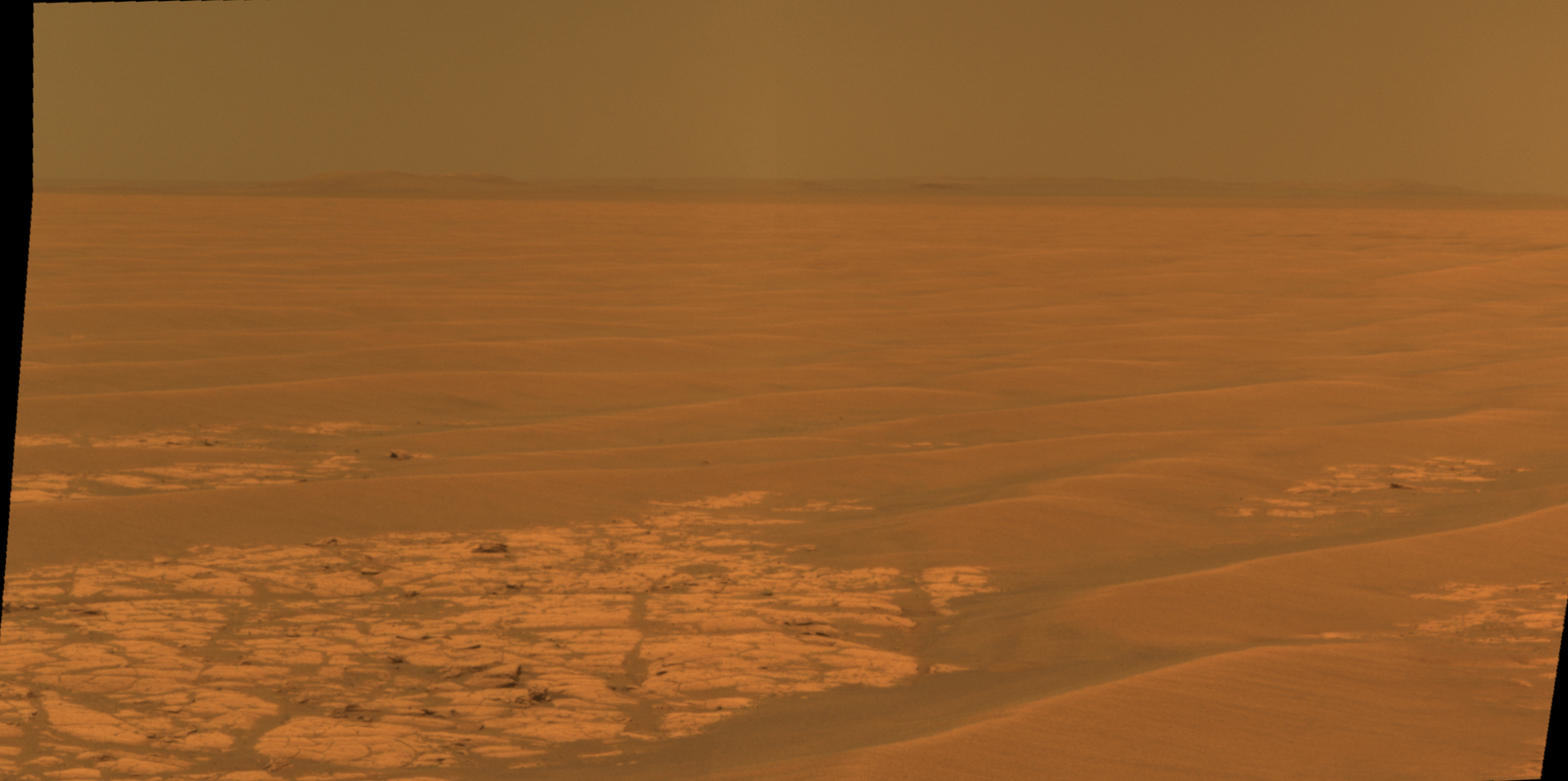
Figure 4. The plain at a field of "plains ripples" soils. Fields of plains ripples cover many square kilometers. The hills on the horizon are the rim of Endeavour Crater. Each plains ripple is a sloped mound of soil, usually around 25 cm tall, 2 m to 4 m wide, and longer than they are wide. The ripples' long axes are roughly aligned north-to-south since the prevailing winds are (like the equatorial trade winds on Earth) from east to west. Each ripple can join with others or be separated by patches of lighter Meridiani sediment outcrop (for example, in the left foreground). A scattering of loose blocks sits on the foreground sediment. Most block are ejecta from meteorite impacts. Plains ripples are smaller than dunes, "armored" by a layer of hematite spherules, and, hence, have exceedingly slow migration rates. Image taken on Sol 2314 (2010-07-28).

=== Inside craters: Layered sediments, Burns Cliff ===
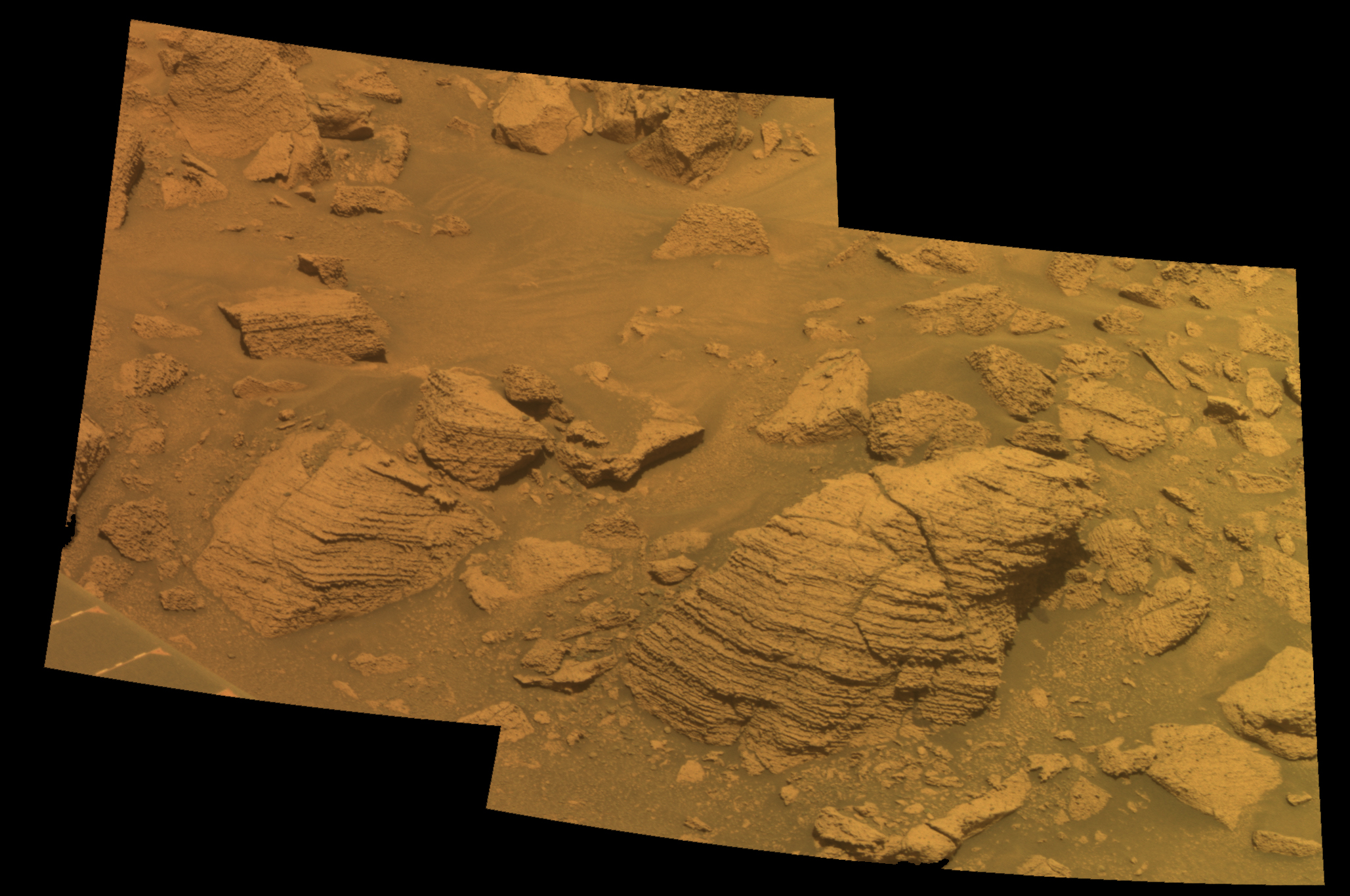
Figure 5. Blocks of Meridiani sediment in the walls of Concepcion Crater. Concepcion Crater is unusually young (roughly 100,000 years). So the exposed layered sediment surfaces imaged here are some of the freshest, least-weathered sediment layers photographed by Opportunity's Pancam. When viewed full size, these Pancam images (Figures 5 & 6) have just enough resolution to show many small hematite spherules embedded in the sediments. Another higher-resolution camera, the Microscopic Imager, took the best images of the hematite spherules (more below). Image taken on Sol 2147 (2010-02-06).

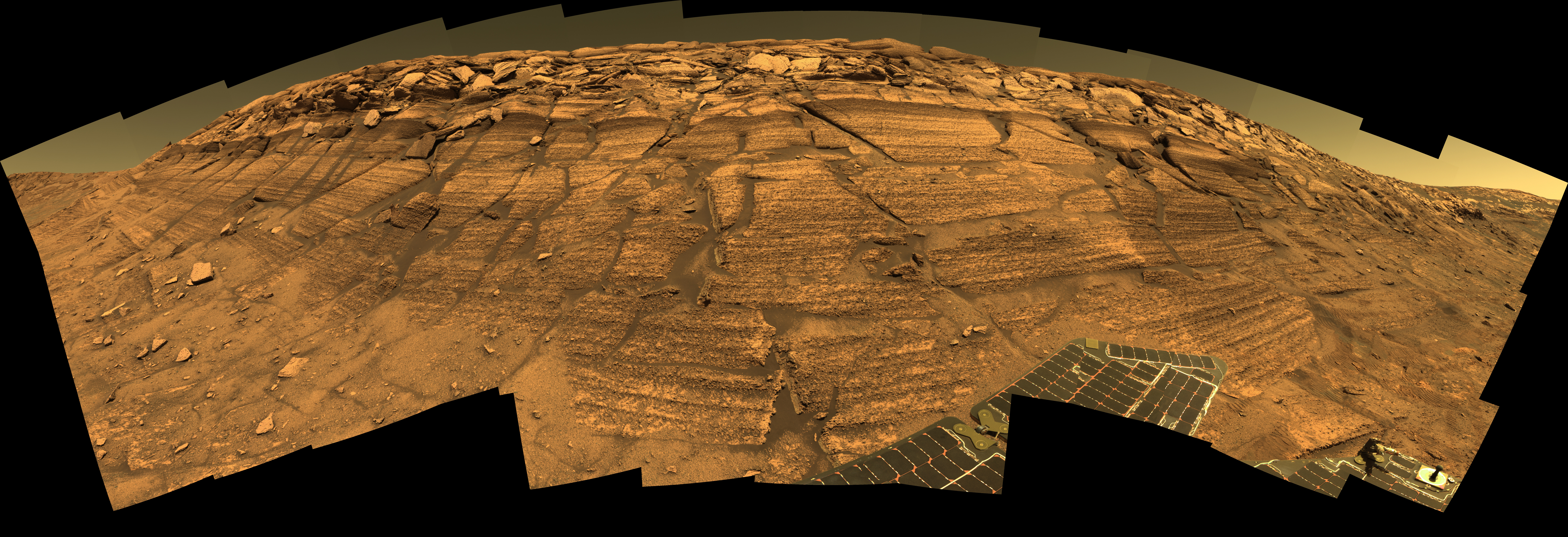
Figure 6. Burns Cliff in Endurance Crater. This image is one of the best known by Opportunity's Pancam. The original file is a huge (12,316 x 4,218 pixels) "mosaic" of many images. It has a "fish eye" view distortion. Click on the image for higher resolution. Burns Cliff is at least 7 m tall. Meridiani sediment cliffs as big as Burns Cliff are not common. They only occur in large Meridiani craters younger than the sediments. The sediments in Burns Cliff are more weathered than those in Figure 5 since Endurance Crater is much older than Concepcion Crater. Opportunity collected data at Burns Cliff over several months in 2004, and many important papers used this data. Images taken on Sols 287-294 (2004-11-13 to 2004-11-20).

=== Iron on the ground: Spherules (Blueberries), meteorites ===
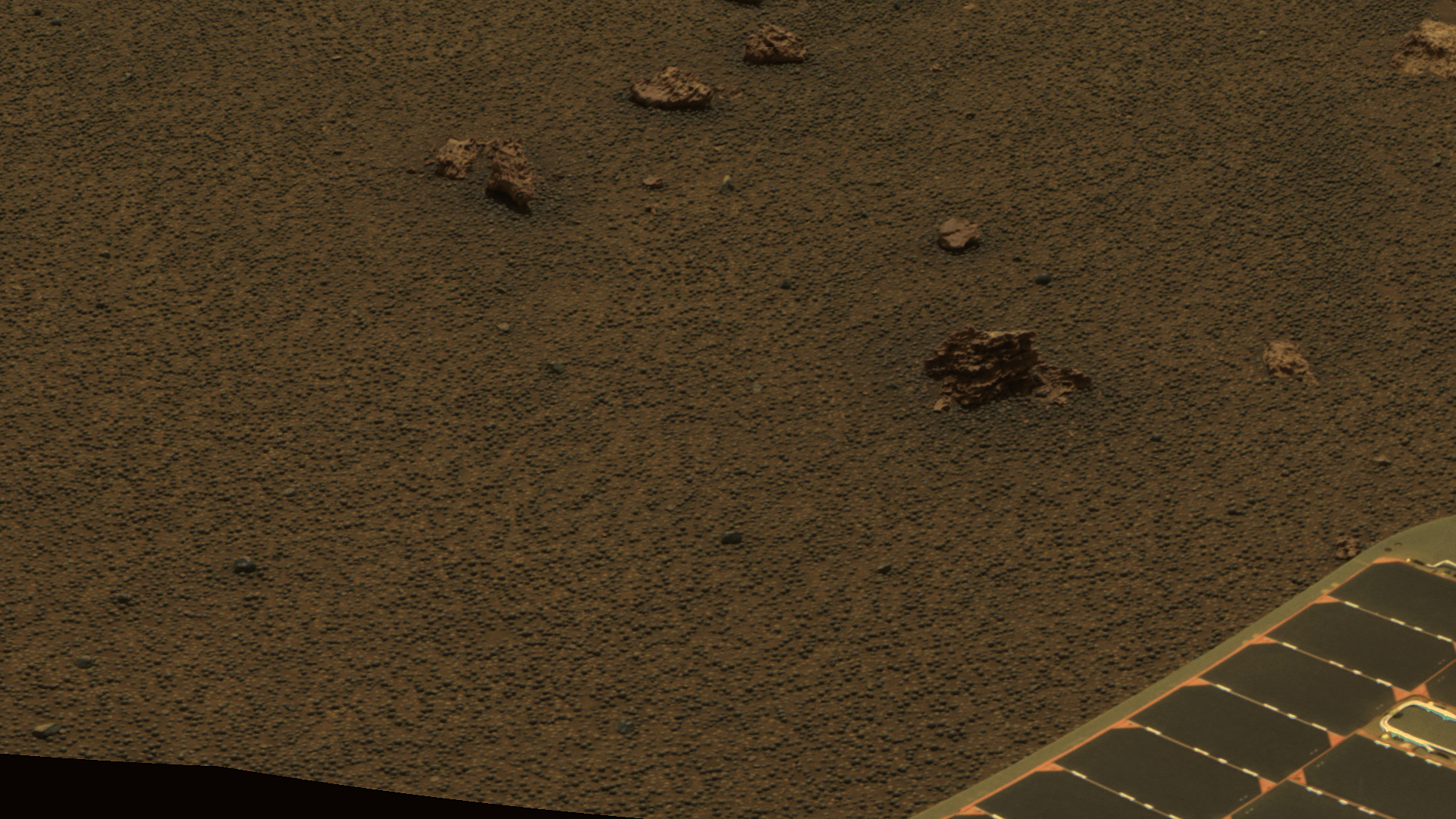
Figure 7. Many hematite spherules over an area bigger than 1 m^{2}. This image is cropped from the foreground of Figure 9. At full size, it is good at clearly imaging many thousands of hematite spherules (about 20,000 spherules strewn over an area of roughly 2 m^{2}). The clarity of the imaging was due to the favorable lighting and dust conditions. The larger blocks in the image are crater ejecta from the adjacent tiny Granada Crater (refer to the right side of Figure 9 below). These crater ejecta are small pieces of Meridiani sediment. Hematite spherules embedded in the ejecta sediment are visible. Some of Opportunity's solar panels are visible in the foreground. Image taken on Sol 1162 (2007-05-01).

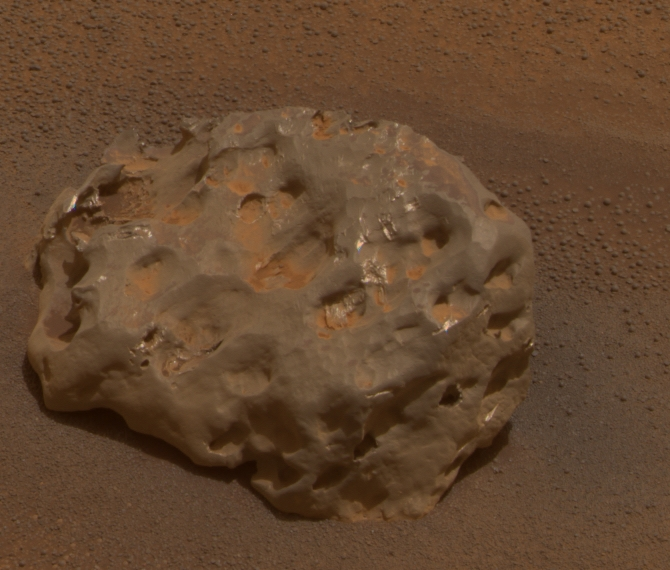
Figure 8. An example iron-nickel meteorite, Heat Shield Rock, with many hematite spherules in the background. Heat Shield Rock can also be seen in Figure 3 as a small dot about 20 m to the left of the discarded heat shield (hence the meteorite's name). It is large. Its longest dimension is 31 cm, i.e. roughly basketball-sized. Large iron-nickel meteorites were occasional featured finds by Opportunity, the rover found six of them. Image taken on Sol 346 (2005-02-01).

=== Crater rim overview (large and small) ===
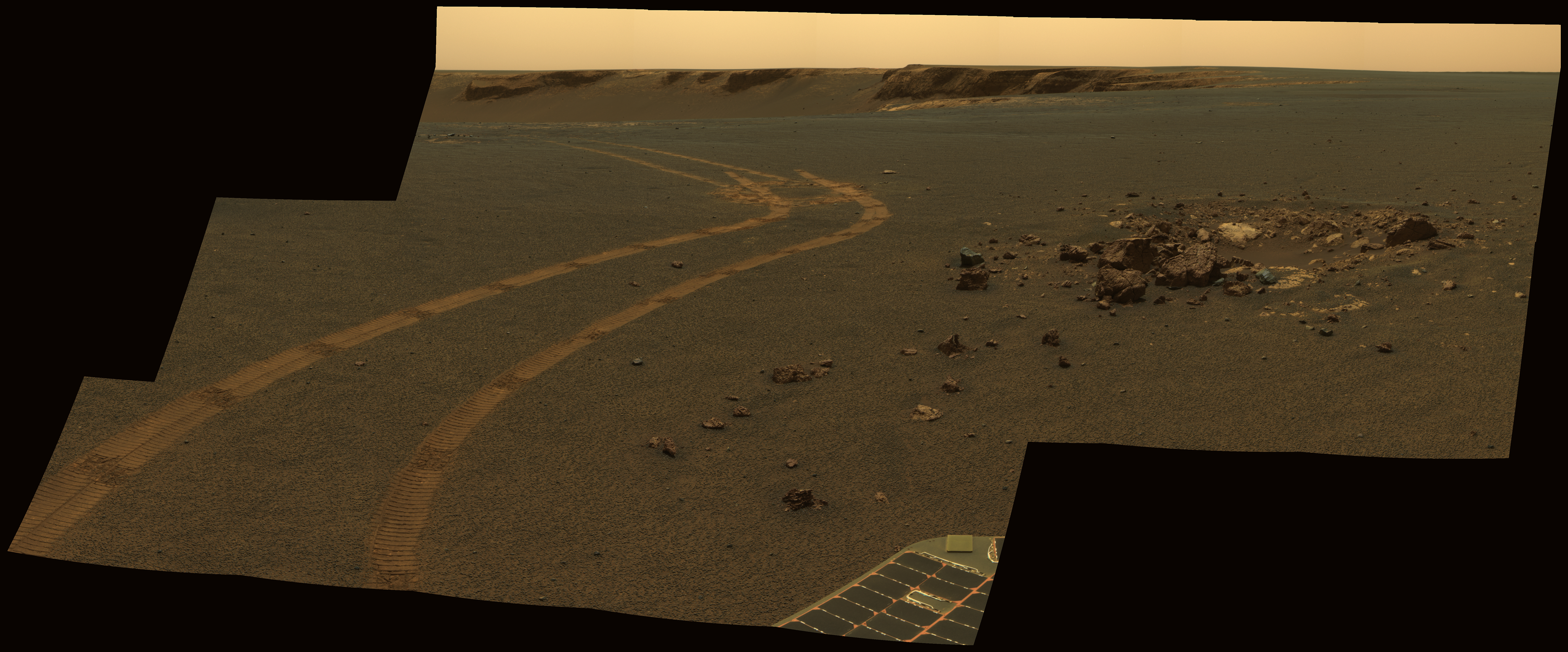
Figure 9. Sol 1162 (2007-05-01). The vicinity of the rim of Victoria Crater. This image shows a tiny (~1 m diameter) crater, Granada Crater, and this crater's ejecta in the right foreground, and a large 800m diameter crater, Victoria Crater, in the left background. The tracks of the rover Opportunity wind across the image around the two craters. The larger crater is much older (> 140 million years) than the smaller one (a few hundred thousand years) and in a more advanced state of erosion. An expanse of smooth sandy soils fill out the background. Image taken on Sol 1162 (2007-05-01).

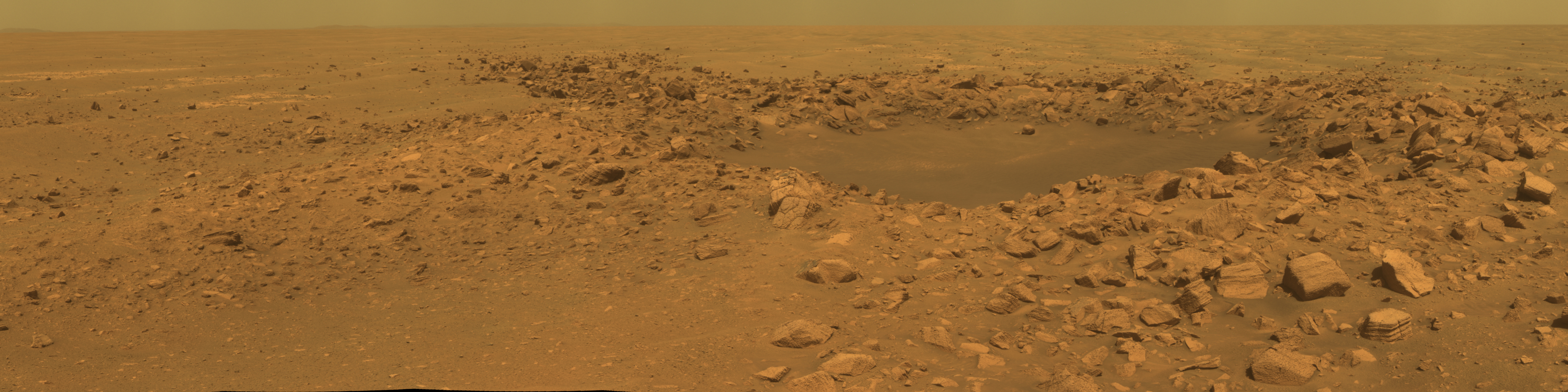
Figure 10. Concepcion Crater on Meridiani Planum. It is very young (~100,000 years old). It is not on the list of officially named craters; however, it was featured in Golombek et al 2014 a study of erosion at Meridiani Planum. The damage to the plain's sediments caused by the impact of the crater-forming meteorite aids in converting sediment embedded spherules into loose surface blueberries. This photograph is helpful for understanding the erosional processes that create the soils and loose blueberries (discussed below in a whole sub-section). A field of plain's ripples fills out the background - such background views are common at Meridiani. Image taken on Sol 2140 (2010-01-10).

The dominant visual impressions at eye level are that:

- Meridiani is a very flat plain.
- The plain is primarily covered in dark soils but with patches of lighter sediment outcrop.
- Vast numbers of small bluish-grey hematite spherules (mostly 1 mm - 6 mm in diameter) sit loosely on the soils and sediment outcrop (many more spherules are on soils than outcrop).
- At most locations, you are close to a visible small crater (5 to 30-meter diameters) - the visible small crater density is 65 to 127 craters per km^{2} (about 1 per hectare or about 1 per 2.5 acres). (There are plenty of tiny craters with diameters below 5 m.)
- At larger craters (like Endurance and Victoria Craters), the crater walls expose large (stratigraphic) sections of Meridiani sediments in which many sediment layers and partly embedded hematite spherules are visible.
- Scattered across the plain are (usually smallish) ejecta blocks of sediment from crater-forming meteorite impacts.
- The tall rims of enormous craters (like Endeavour and Bopolu Craters) are visible from great distances.
- Large meteorites sitting on soils and top sediment outcrops are somewhat rare but outstanding features.
- The soils come in fields with two main bedform types (i) smooth sheets (these are remarkably flat, and almost no sediment outcrop is visible in smooth sheet fields) and (ii) plains ripples (these are slopped and usually 10 to 40 cm tall and 1.5 to 5 m wide) that are often interspersed with top sediment outcrop.
- There are many sinuous, 1 cm tall "crest" ripples running on top of smooth sheet fields. These crest ripples are made up of sub-millimeter fragments of hematite spherules.

== Composition of the major materials found at Meridiani Planum ==
This section covers the composition of the major materials found at the Meridiani plain (i.e., sediments, spherules, soils, and dust). The discoveries and compositions of meteorites and long-distance ejecta are given in the next section. A later section covers the geological materials found by Opportunity after August 2011, i.e., around the rim of Endeavour Crater.

=== Sediments ===
The layered sedimentary outcrop rocks exposed in Eagle, Fram, and Endurance caters were examined by the suite of instruments on Opportunity. Mature data analysis found the following (broad category) mineral composition of the sediments (excluding embedded spherules): 36-37 wt% hydrated sulfates, 35 wt% hydrated aluminosilicates, 16 wt% basaltic rock, 10 wt% hematite and other oxides, 2 wt% chlorides, and 1-2 wt% phosphates. An outstanding feature of this composition is the extreme levels of the sulfates. These are about 5 times higher than the overlying Meridiani soils, about 20 times higher than in the basalts in Gusev Crater (investigated Spirit, the sibling MER), and even more extreme relative to typical Earth rocks. The principle sulfates are hydrated magnesium sulfates (e.g., kieserite & epsomite), hydrated calcium sulfates (e.g., bassanite & gypsum), and jarosite (a complicated hydrated sulfate containing iron and probably potassium or sodium); the chloride salts include halite and bischofite. Detecting jarosite was a surprise, and its presence significantly constrains the possible geochemical pathways leading to the formation of Meridiani sediments.

Water content? An outstanding unknown is the amount of residual water in the layered sediments today. Answers from direct measurement by the rover Opportunity were not possible because the rover's instruments could not detect water or hydrogen. However, in 2005, Clark et al. gave a range of 6 wt% to 22 wt% based on an indirect geochemical argument. Further, the actual water content should be higher than the water equivalent hydrogen (WEH) measurements made by the neutron detector orbiting on Mars Odyssey (due to the shallow (1m) penetration depth of the neutron detector and the layer of water-poor top soil covering most areas of Meridiani). In 2005 the measured WEH level at Meridiani was 7 wt%, but continued neutron detection produced a 2018 WEH map indicating 9-10 wt% WEH across Meridiani.

There is a small field of scientific study concentrating on how hydration levels of hydrated magnesium and calcium sulfates vary with temperature at Martain atmosphere pressures. At Martian pressures, these studies readily extracted water from magnesium sulfates with various levels of hydration using applied temperatures between 50 °C and 200 °C. They also observed a hyper-hydrated magnesium sulfate on Earth that they called meridianiite (after Meridiani Planum), with the formula MgSO_{4}.11H_{2}O, which decomposes to epsomite, MgSO_{4}.7H_{2}O, and water at 2 °C.

Opportunity's Alpha particle X-ray spectrometer (APXS) found rather high levels of phosphorus in the rocks. Since the solubility of phosphorus is related to the solubility of uranium, thorium, and rare-earth elements, it was suggested these other metals are also enriched in Meridiani outcrop sediments.

=== Spherules ===
==== Early spherule results ====
Early on, Opportunity's Mössbauer spectrometer took data that determined that the iron mineral component of these spherules is dominated by hematite. However, the Mössbauer spectrometer provided no information about the mineral components of these spherules that do not contain iron.

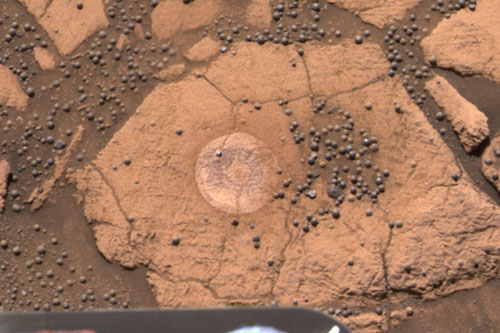
Figure 11. Site of "berry bowl" experiment. The two sampling targets are next to each other. Image taken on Sol 48 (2004-03-13).

The "berry bowl" experiment took alpha particle X-ray spectrometer (APXS) readings of two sampling targets just centimeters apart: One had no (zero or one) spherules in the spectrometer's field of view (FOV), while the other had around 25 spherules in the FOV. Figure 11 shows the adjacent "berry bowl" sampling targets. The APXS results indicated there was noticeably more iron in the target with ~25 spherules relative to the target with 0 or 1 spherules. Based on this and similar experiments, several unreviewed conference abstracts claimed (deliberately not cited here) that hematite dominated the composition of the spherules and some published papers cited these conference claims. However, there were reasons to be cautious. The instruments detected mixed signals from sampling targets that included signals not only from the spherules but also from dust and rock (in the "berry bowl" experiment) or dust and soils (in other composition data collections). In 2006, Morris et al. showed that the methods used by some researchers to pick out the spherule composition signal from the dust and soil signals were flawed and that such methods could do no more than constrain the iron oxide content of the spherules to between 24 wt% and 100 wt% (that is, almost no constraint at all).

==== Later spherule results ====
A 2008 paper published the result of a clever experiment that showed Opportunity's mini-TES (thermal emission spectrometer) could not detect any silicate minerals in the spherules. This non-detection constrained silicate levels in spherules to less than 10 wt% and probably below 8 wt%. This result is helpful since the APXS data shows a strong anti-correlation between silicates and iron oxide in the spherules - so low silicate levels indicate high iron oxide levels.

A recent paper used the mini-TES's non-detection of silicates and some improved data analysis methods to find over 340,000 allowable standard oxide chemical compositions for the spherules (allowable = consistent with the silicate non-detection). The lowest and highest weight percentages for the iron oxide content in these allowable spherule compositions were, respectively, 79.5 wt% and 99.8 wt%. While, for the large majority of the allowable compositions, the iron oxide contents in the spherules were between 85 wt% and 96 wt%; further, the nickel content was always close to 0.3 wt%, a group of five standard oxides (MgO, Na_{2}O, P_{2}O_{5}, SO_{3}, and Cl) each had content above trace-level with a combined group content of 6.8 ± 2.4 wt%, the SiO_{2} levels ranged between 8 wt% and 0 wt%, and the other eight APXS standard oxides had either 0 wt% content or only trace level content.

=== Soils ===
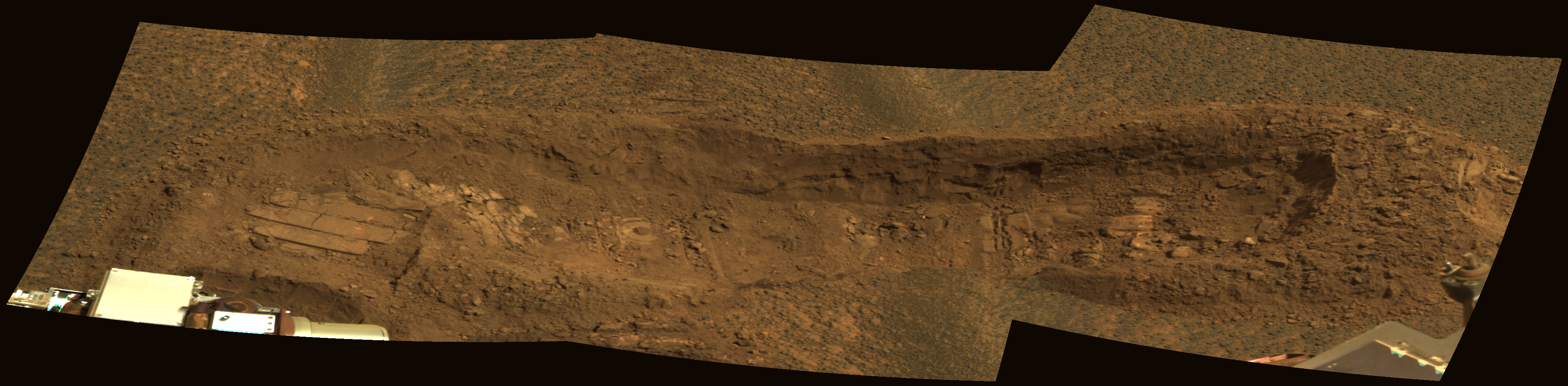
Figure 12. Trench in smooth sheet soils on the Meridiani Planum, Mars. Note, there are almost no hematite spherules or spherule fragments below the thin top layer. Basaltic soils dominate under the top-layer. Image taken on Sol 372 (2005-02-09).

The underlying soils at Meridiani Planum are similar to those at Gusev Crater, Ares Vallis, and Gale Crater; although, the levels of sulfates in Meridiani soils are noticeably higher than other locations. At Meridiani Planum, the soils are armored with a thin top layer of hematite spherules with their distinct composition (not found at Gusev Crater, Ares Vallis, and Gale Crater). This layering of spherules (and spherule fragments) on top, with basaltic soils below, is shown in Figure 12.

Most of the underlying soil consists of basaltic material but mixed with varying amounts of dust and sulfate-rich ejecta debris from the sediments. A typical mineral composition for basaltic Meridiani soils is 40 wt% plagioclase, 35 wt% pyroxenes, 15 wt% amorphous glasses, 10 wt% olivine, and around 5 wt% sulfates and oxides. Standard oxide compositions for typical basaltic soils are 44-46 wt% SiO_{2}, 18-19 wt% FeO + Fe_{2}O_{3}, 9-10 wt% Al_{2}O_{3}, 7.4 wt% MgO, 6.9 wt% CaO_{2}, 5.8 wt% SO_{3}, 2.2 wt% Na_{2}O, ~5 wt% other oxides (total).

=== Dust ===
Dust covers everything all over Mars and the composition of this dust is essentially uniform everywhere, due to the many dust storms over Mars, including global dust storms every few years.

Opportunity's APXS measurement of a commonly referenced dust-covered sampling target, MontBlanc_LeHauches, gives a dust composition that is largely basaltic in character with the following weight perecentages for the standard oxides: 45.3 wt% SiO_{2}, 17.6 wt% Fe0, 9.2 wt% Al_{2}O_{3}, 7.6 wt% MgO, 7.3 wt% SO_{3}, 6.6 wt% CaO, 2.2 wt% Na_{2}0, 1.0 TiO_{2}, 0.9 wt% P_{2}O_{5}, and a total of 2.0 wt% for the other seven standard oxides.

A Mössbauer spectrum was made of the dust that gathered on Opportunity's capture magnet. The results suggested that the magnetic component of the dust was titanomagnetite, rather than just plain magnetite, as was once thought. A small amount of olivine was detected which was interpreted as indicating a long arid period on the planet. On the other hand, a small amount of hematite that was present meant that there may have been liquid water for a short time in the early history of the planet.

== Discoveries of meteorites and long distance ejecta ==
=== Meteorites ===
Opportunity found six large iron-nickel meteorites just sitting on the plains (Heat Shield Rock (shown in Figure 8), Block Island, Shelter Island, Mackinac Island, Oileán Ruaidh, and Ireland), although these six may originate from fewer impacts (i.e., an original meteor broke into pieces). Examination with the Miniature Thermal Emission Spectrometer (Mini-TES), Mossbauer spectrometer, and APXS led researchers to classify Heat Shield Rock as an IAB meteorite with close to 93 wt% iron content and 7 wt% nickel content (mostly in metallic form). Heat Shield Rock (see Figure 8) was the first meteorite recognized on another planet. (The other MER, Spirit, found two rocks in Gusev Crater, "Allan Hills" and "Zhong Shan," that may be iron meteorites.)

The top layers of the plain's soils contain a noticeable content (~1 wt%) of small-particle, iron-nickel meteoritic material - many iron-nickel meteorites disintegrate during descent and impact, and these pieces were too small for the Pancam to identify.

Stony meteorites are more challenging to identify than iron-nickel meteorites. However, the cobble named "Fig Tree Barberton" and three others in the "Barberton group" are thought to be stony or stony-iron meteorites (mesosiderite silicate).

Opportunity studied nine cobbles in the "Arkansas Group" that were breccias displaying evidence of material melting from heat generated by meteorite impacts.

=== Long distance ejecta ===
The rover found two odd boulders with mineralogies significantly different from the plain's common sediment rocks. One rock, "Bounce Rock," contains mainly pyroxene and plagioclase but no olivine. It closely resembled a part, Lithology B, of the shergottite meteorite EETA 79001, a meteorite on Earth known to have come from Mars. Bounce rock received its name by being bounced on by the airbags of Opportunity's lander. The other rock, "Marquette Island," is believed to have originated deep inside the crust of Mars. Both "Bounce Rock" and "Marquette Island" are considered to be ejecta from large crater impacts occurring off the plain at large distances from where these rocks were found by the rover.

== Geological history ==
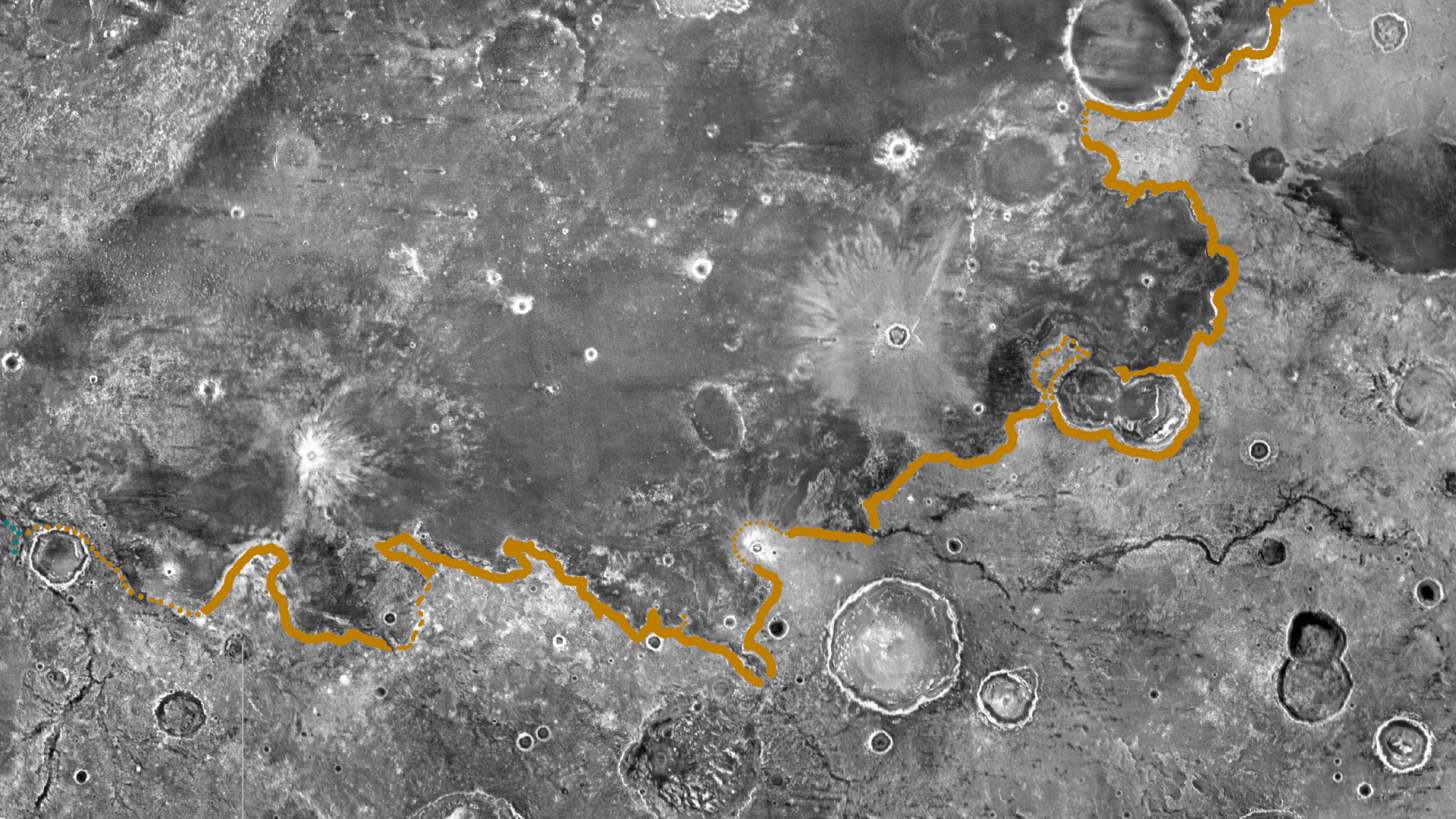
Figure 13. Thermal inertia map of the southern half of Meridiani Planum and a region to the south of it. Dried-up river valleys are visible in the region to the south. These dried-up rivers used to flow into the Meridiani sediments, the dry valleys now end at the plain. The imaging was made from orbit by the THEMIS instrument on board the Mars Odyssey orbiter.

The history of geological change at Meridiani Planum fits into three epochs with distinct processes. These three eras of change at Meridiani align reasonably well with the three standard epochs for the whole planet, i.e., the Noachian, Hesperian, and Amazonian epochs.

=== Noachian River flows ===
Prior to the formation of Meridiani's defining sediments, in the wet Noachian (named for the biblical Noah) more than about ~3.7 billion years ago, liquid water was present and plentiful enough to form river channels that bought and deposited large quantities of basaltic silt to the current Meridiani region. Edgett and Parker could barely discern some of these river valleys in the Viking orbiter images from the 1970s. However, they are easy to see in thermal inertia images taken in orbit by Mars Odyssey and reproduced in Figure 13 (click on it for higher resolution). These river channels took water from the higher ground in the southeast (lower right of Figure 13) toward the northwest and down to the present-day Meridiani Planum. The river valleys seen in Figure 13 terminate abruptly as they flow into the Meridiani's massive formation of sediments.

Current evidence points to the sloping ground (necessary for the river flows) being created by a giant tilt in the surface of Terra Meridiani Mars caused by the emergence of the enormous Tharsis Plateau and the vast volcanoes of Tharsis several thousand kilometers away.

=== Formation of today's sediments and embedded spherules ===
From around the late-Noachian/early-Hesperian to sometime around 3.5 billion years ago, the layered sediments deposited in the earlier Noachian epoch were transformed. This transformation probably included a significant additional deposition of high-sulfur-content material of volcanic origin. The change certainly included aqueous geochemistry that was acidic and salty, as well as rising & falling water levels: Features providing evidence include cross-bedded sediments, the presence of vugs (cavities), and embedded hematite spherules that cut across sediment layers, additionally the presence of large amounts of magnesium sulfate and other sulfate-rich minerals such as jarosite and chlorides. Jarosite formation requires aqueous acidic conditions below pH 3.

Figures 14 and 15 show Microscopic Imager close-up images of the sediment rock matrix that appeared (cropped) in a prestigious paper. Figure 14 illustrates the four physical constituents of sediment outcrop: (i) the sedimentary layers containing a lot of basaltic sand particles; (ii) the embedded hematite spherules; (iii) fine-grained, sulfate-rich cement (in most parts of the outcrop); (iv) vug cavities (that are thought to be molds for crystals of, for example, hydrated sulfates). Figure 15 images a similar sediment outcrop surface to Figure 14. However, Opportunity's Rock Abrasion Tool abraded this surface. Such abrasions showed that (a) the sediment layers are very soft and easy to cut, and (b) the hematite spherules have uniform internal structures.

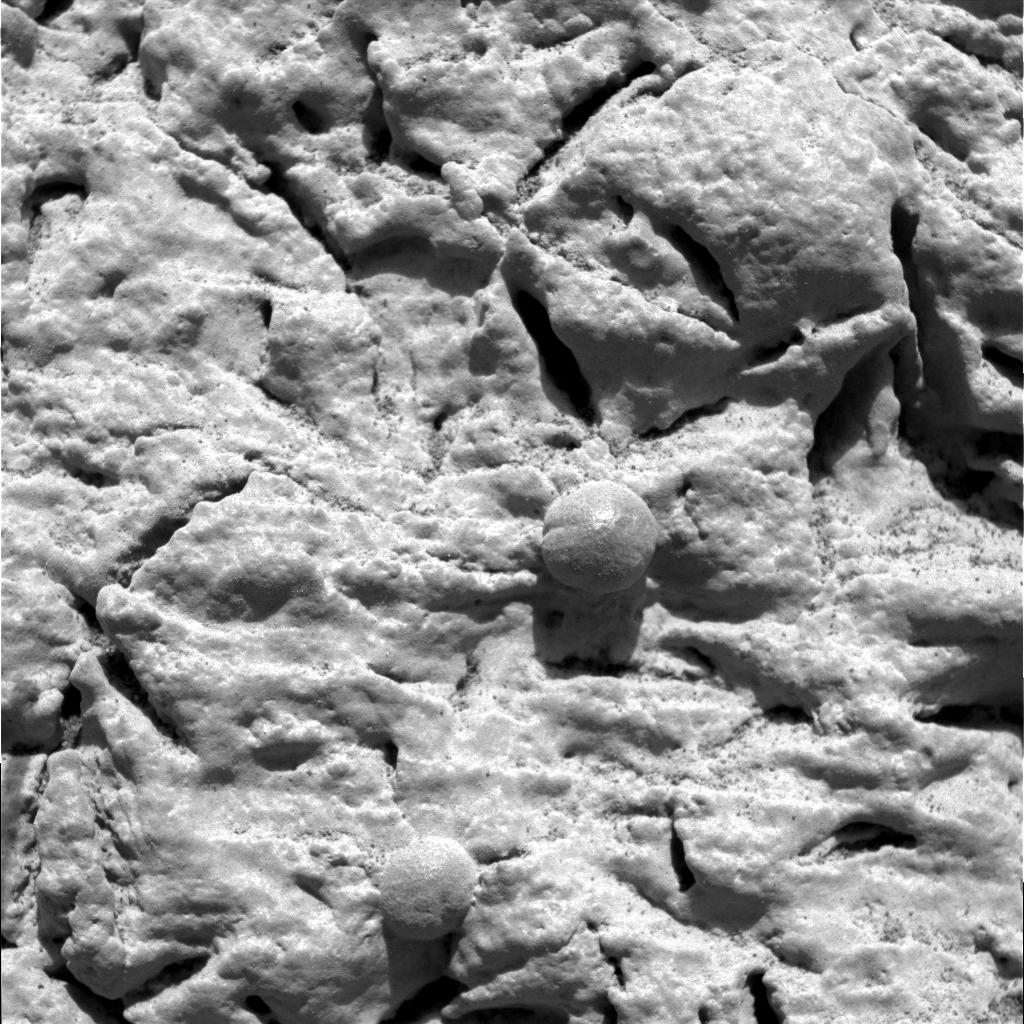
Figure 14. Close-up of sediment matrix with embedded hematite spherules at Eagle Crater. The central (partially embedded) spherule is 3.7 mm in diameter. The image covers an approximate 32 mm x 32 mm area. It was taken on Sol 29 (2004-02-24).

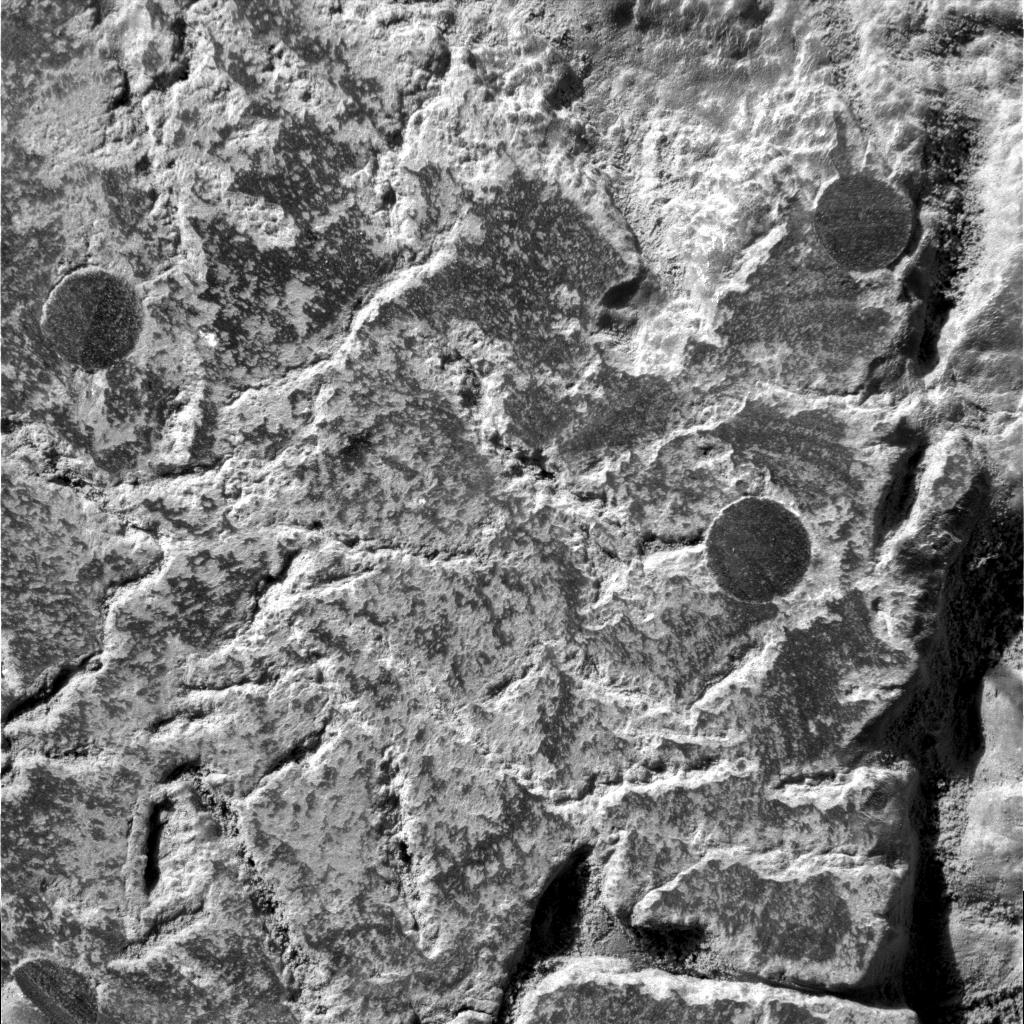
Figure 15. Close-up of sediment matrix and embedded hematite spherules abraded by Opportunity's Rock Abrasion Tool. This Eagle Crater image covers an approximate 32 mm x 32 mm area. It was taken on Sol 34 (2004-02-29).

The "diagenetic" transformation (i.e., change by water-rock interactions) to today's sediments involved a significant shift in water flows in the region. The inflows from rivers became less and less, and in this period, the dominant water movements in the sediments became vertical movements with rising and falling aquifer levels. At least one model of global Martian hydrology accounts for the historical shift in water flows at Meridiani Planum. This model links Meridiani's change in water flows to activity in the volcanic Tharsis region. With the vertical aquifer flows, it is believed that (playa) lakes repeatedly formed and disappeared as the aquifer levels rose and fell. (The dry area around Utah's Great Salt Lake is a playa.) The Opportunity team found minerals ("evaporites") that typically form when salty water evaporates; these evaporites cemented together other components of the sediment (such as basaltic particles and the spherules).

McLennan and his students constructed a geochemical model that generates hematite within a context like the Meridiani sediment. The hematite formed into spherules by concretion. The concretion process to form near spherical balls (spherules) of hematite probably occurred by diffusion of the hematite through the sedimentary rock matrix (the hematite still in the rock matrix probably fixed in place when moveable water disappeared).

The results of these transformations are still largely intact today. The main subsequent changes just affected the top layers of the Meridiani sediments (more below).

=== Crater degradation, formation of soils and loose spherules ===
The period of rising and falling aquifer levels ceased, and no water flowed on Meridiani Planum thereafter. Although, when this happened is poorly understood. Estimates include around 3.5 billion years ago and about 3 billion years ago. The only water left at the plain was and is bound in rocks.

Erosion with water flows in earlier eras was much faster than in this last (and present) arid epoch. However, erosion did not stop. Other much slower erosional processes continued and became the primary agents of change to the plain. This slower change was and is driven by meteorite impacts, the wind, and gravity. Over the hard-to-grasp eon of around three billion years, meteorite impacts, and the wind formed the sandy topsoil and loose hematite spherules and sorted these into the layered soil bedforms that Opportunity's Pancam photographed, and we can now see.

The meteorite, gravity, and wind-driven processes work like this:

- Over billions of years, meteorite impacts created many craters on the plain.
- There were enough small (5 to 30 m diameter) craters created in the eon of around three billion years to cover, on average, the whole plain once. Although, each small crater degraded and disappeared in about 25 million years or less, and only about 0.7% of the plain's area is presently covered in small craters.
- Each meteorite impact produces large numbers of blocks of sediment material in the crater rim and as ejecta around the crater: See, for example, Concepcion Crater in Figure 10 and the tiny Granada Crater (on the right side) of Figure 9.
- Most of the initial sediment blocks project above the surrounding material (by a few centimeters or more) and are exposed to saltating sand (i.e., wind-driven, bouncing sand).
- The saltating sand erodes the soft, easy-to-erode parts of the sediment matrix in the projecting blocks.
- These blocks are either completely eroded or erode until they become smooth and no longer project into saltating sand.
- This block erosion creates dust particles and turns embedded spherules into loose spherules (more below).
- The dust particles are blown off the plain and become part of the global dust.
- The sulfates preferentially turn into dust and are transported off the plain by the wind.
- The larger basalt sand particles, spherules fragments, and hematite spherules remain in place on the plain.
- Wind, gravity, and size-sorting created the soil bedforms from the basaltic sands, spherule fragments, and spherules.
- With the aid of gravity and wind, the original (small) crater holes are gradually filled in (with material from eroded rim blocks and other local erosion material), and the plain is returned to a flat state.

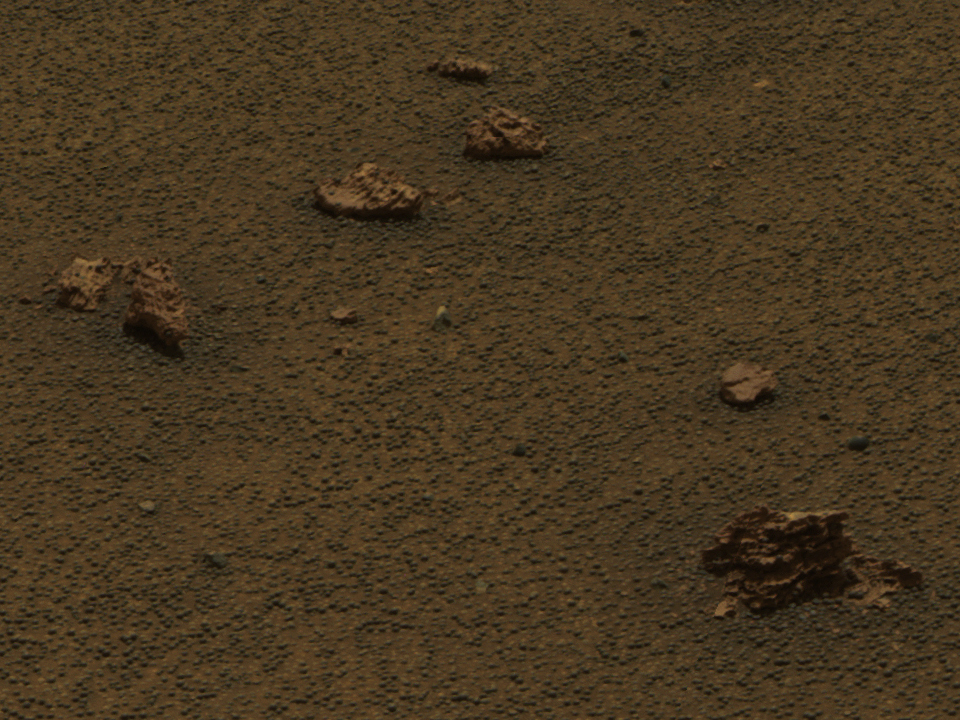
Figure 17. Detail showing hematite spherules eroding out of blocks of sediment ejecta. Notice the increased surface density of loose spherules lying in rings around the small clocks of sediment ejecta. This image is cropped from Figure 7. It was taken on Sol 1162 (2007-0501).

Phil Christensen outlined these processes in 2004, soon after Opportunity landed. Later, more in-depth research (with more years of data from Opportunity) confirmed the above processes and added details. Christensen's rapid assessment of the erosional processes was probably connected to his correct 2000 prediction that the plain's surface material is soft and easy-to-erode (friable). And that prediction was made after orbiter data showed that Meridiani Planum is very smooth and that small craters degrade and disappear more rapidly than in adjoining regions.

Opportunity found that Meridiani sediments are soft and friable. More satellite and rover data showed that erosion rates on the Meridiani Planum are both very slow (relative to water-related erosion on Earth and early Mars) but also extremely fast (about 30 to 300 times faster) when compared to other arid regions of Mars (such as Gusev Crater).

Figure 17 shows hematite spherules as they turned from being embedded spherules into loose spherules. In Figure 17, right around seven blocks of eroding sediment ejecta (from the tiny Granada Crater) are rings surrounding these blocks where these rings are formed by locally high surface concentrations of loose spherules and caused by additional loose spherules eroding out of the blocks of sediment. Figure 17 is cropped from Figure 7, which was, in turn, cropped from Figure 9. Click and enlarge Figure 17 to see the high-density rings of spherules.

== Size and surface density of hematite spherules (blueberries) ==
=== Spherule size ===
The size of the hematite spherules varied by location along Opportunity's traverse of Meridiani Planum. The figures below illustrate this variation. Figures 18, 19, and 20 show loose surface spherules at Eagle Crater (the rover's landing site in January 2004), 500m northwest of Victoria Carter (August 2007), and 200m outside the rim of Endeavour crater (late July 2011). The straight-line distance between the sampling targets shown in Figures 18 and 20 is about 23 km (the rover's route between the two targets was 33 km). Figure 20 features one of the largest spherules photographed on the plain by Opportunity's Microscopic Imager; it is 8.3 mm in diameter.

Figure 21 shows spherule fragments (or very small spherules) in a "crest ripple". These were right next to much larger spherules lying on top of smooth sandy soils and within a few meters of the trench shown in Figure 12. The top section of Figure 12 shows two crest ripples and the much larger spherules spread out between the crest ripples on top of the soils. The wide view Figure 3 also shows crest ripples as the sinuous wind-formed lines on top of the smooth sandy soil bedforms.

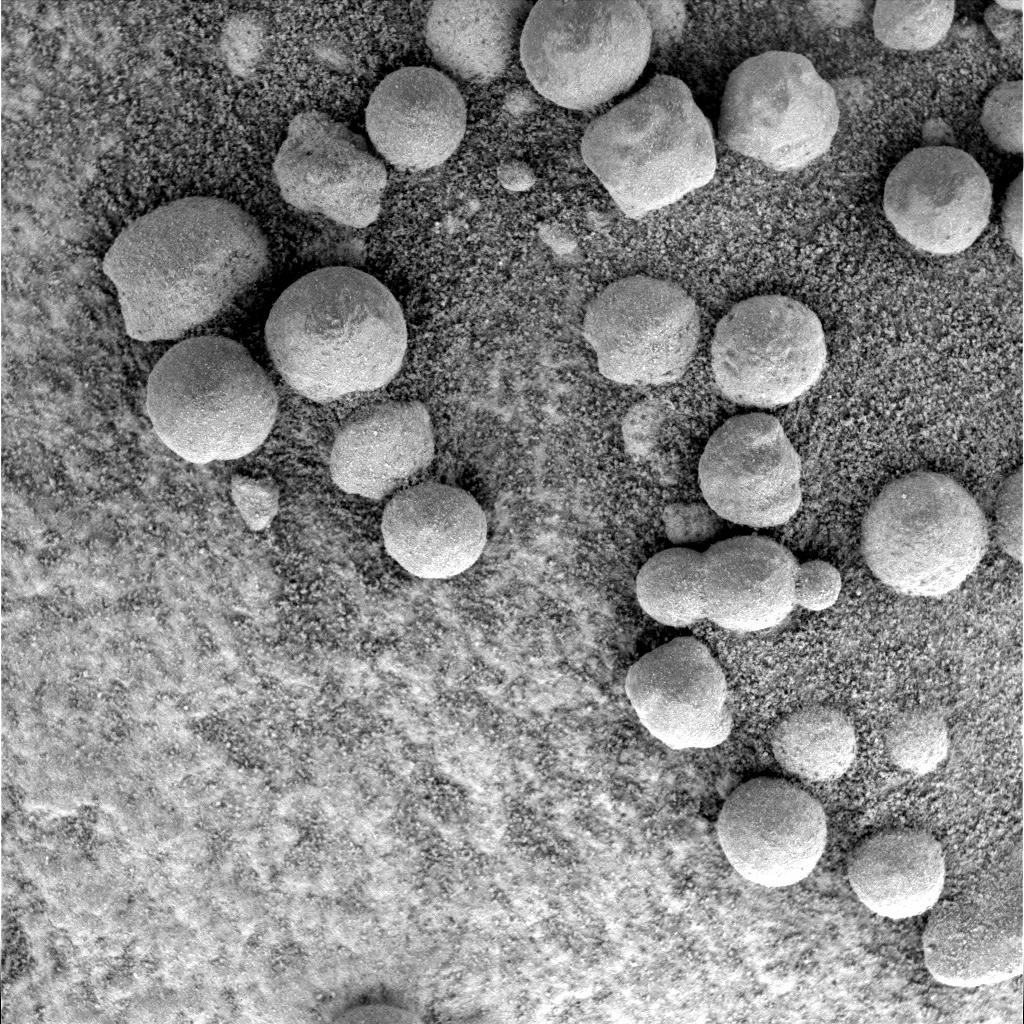
Figure 18. Loose hematite spherules on an outcrop of sediments at Eagle Crater. At this location, most spherule diameters were 4 - 6 mm; in this image, the range is 3 - 6 mm. Image taken on Sol 46 (2004-03-10).

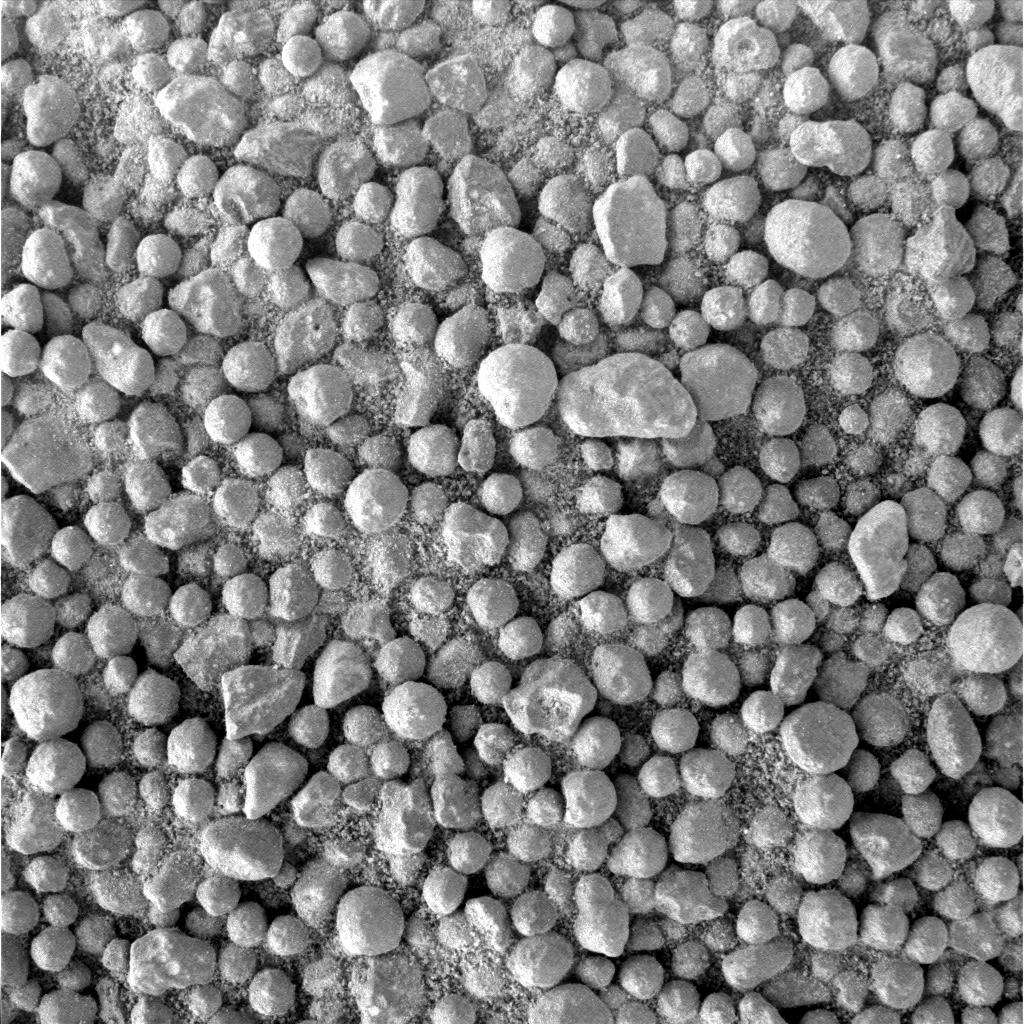
Figure 19. Small, loose hematite spherules on soils about 500 m northwest of Victoria Crater. In this image, most spherules have 1 - 2 mm diameters. A few have diameters under 1 mm, and the largest is 2.5 mm x 4 mm. Image taken on Sol 910 (2004-08-15).
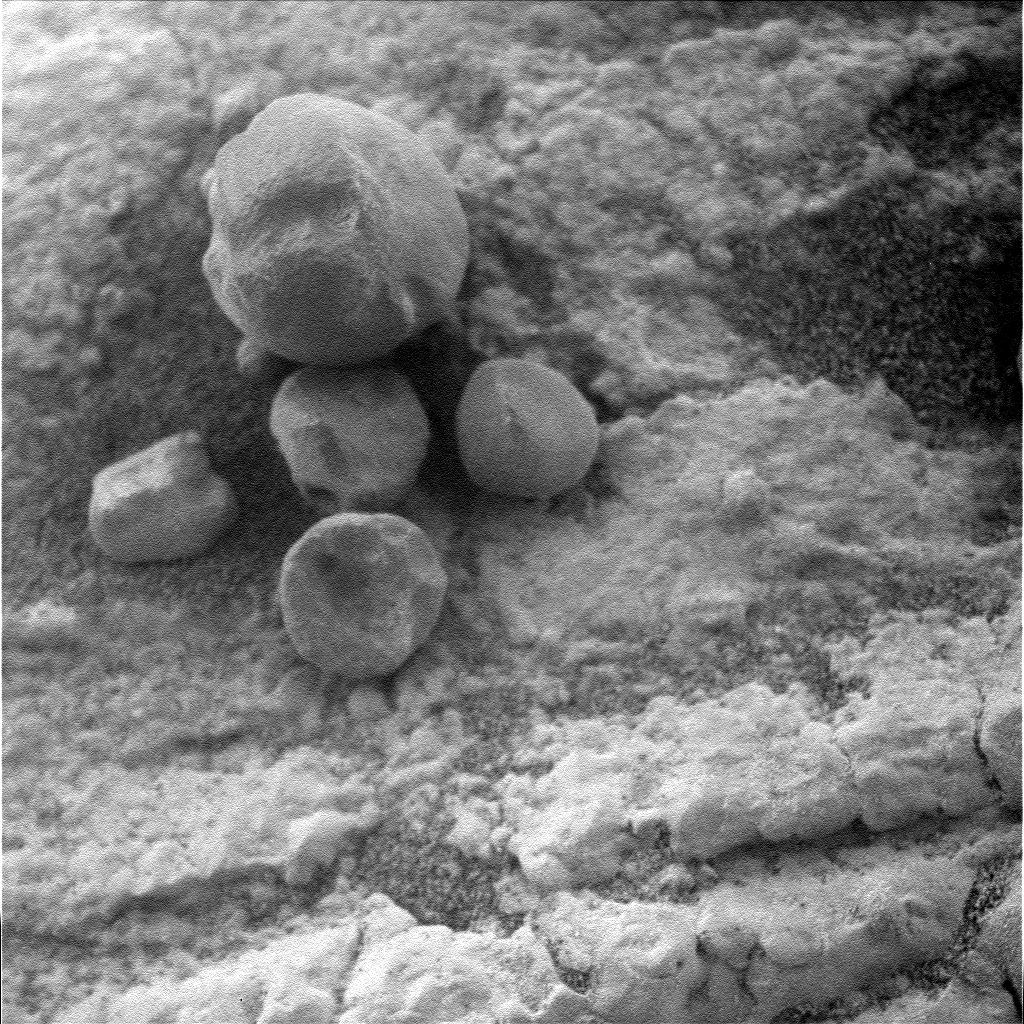
Figure 20. A few loose hematite spherules on an outcrop of sediments about 200 m from Endeavour Crater. The largest spherule has a diameter of 8.3 mm - this is one of the biggest photographed anywhere by Opportunity. The lower number density of spherules in this image is mainly due to the spherules sitting on outcrop rock rather than on soil. The number density on nearby soils are at normal, i.e., high, levels. Image taken on Sol 2669 (2011-07-28).

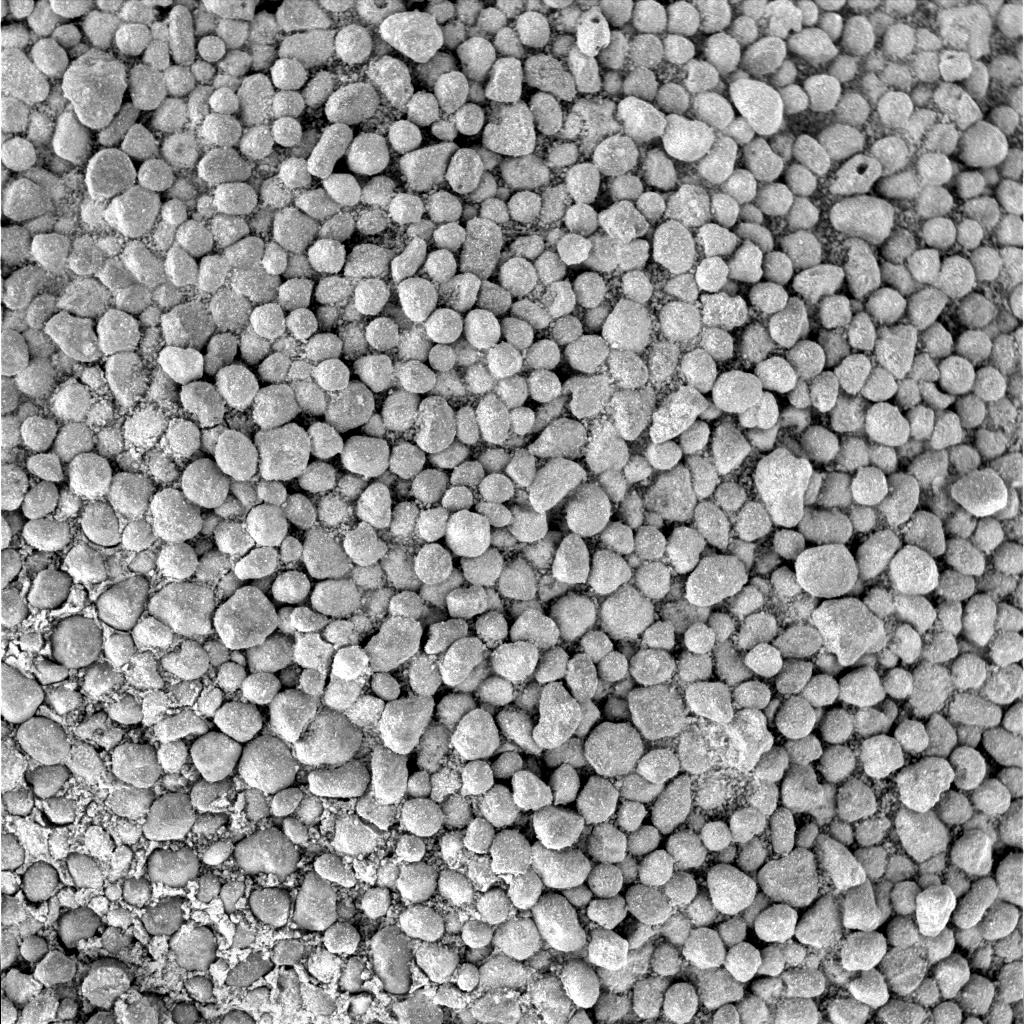
Figure 21. Small loose hematite spherule fragments (or very small spherules) in a crest ripple on smooth sandy soils about 650 m south of Endurance Crater. The diameters of most small spherules/fragments are between 0.7 mm and 1.5 mm. This image was taken within a few meters of the trench in Figure 12. The top part of Figure 12 shows a wide-angle view of two crest ripples (bisected by the trench) with much larger hematite spherules spread out on top of the soils between the two crest ripples. Image taken on Sol 369 (2005-02-06).

=== Numbers of hematite spherules and loose spherule surface density ===
There are no peer-reviewed published estimates of the number of loose hematite spherules on Meridiani's soils or embedded hematite spherules in the plain's sediments. However, the reader can sense how mind-boggling big those numbers are with a photograph of an area of soil with a typical surface density of the hematite spheres. Such a photograph has been published.

Figures 22 and 23 are true-color and false-color versions of the photo. The spherules are easier to see in the published false-color version (Figure 23). Click on it to enlarge it. The sampling target of Figures 22 & 23 had 29% coarse hematite coverage. The range of coverage among similar targets was 10% to 40%. These targets were sampled over a wide area, between Sol 70 (2004-04-04) and Sol 999 (2007-11-15).

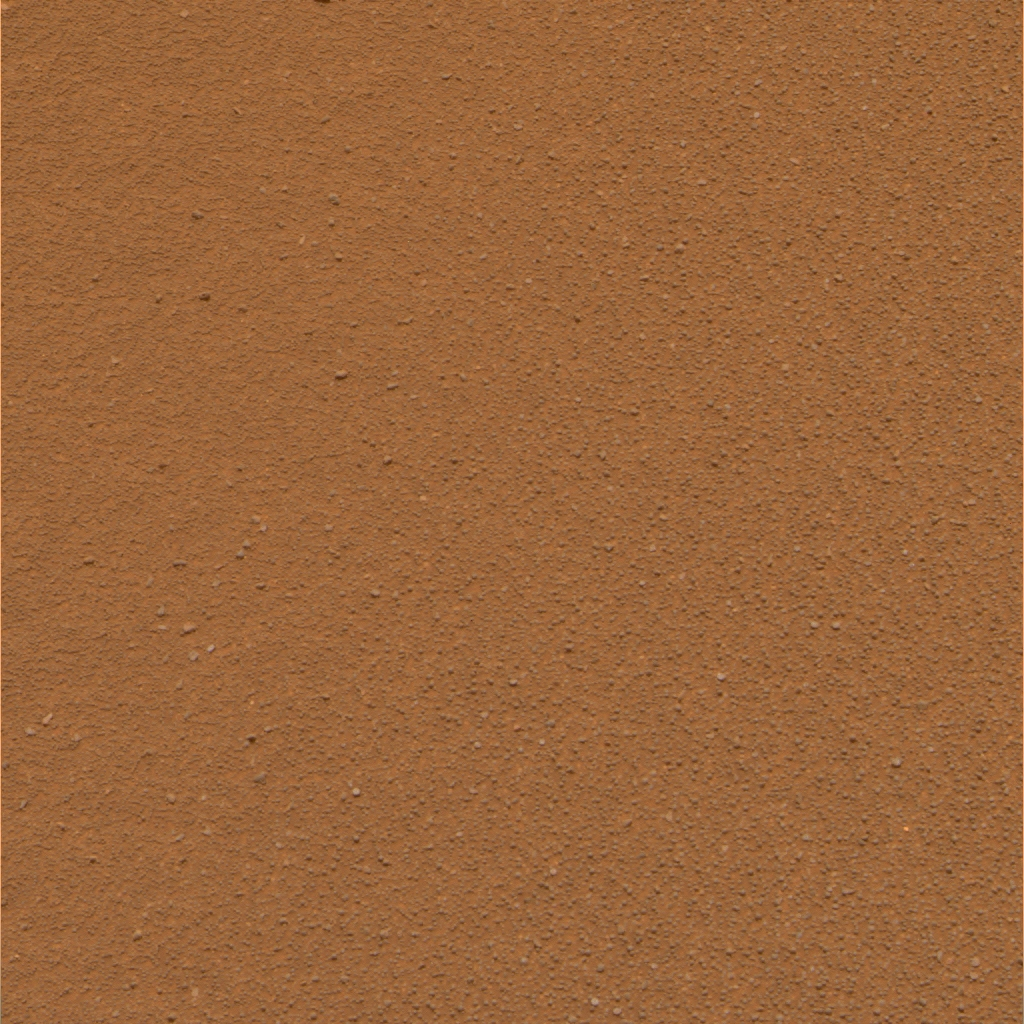
Figure 22. This (approximate true color) image is a surface hematite sampling target taken by Opportunity's Pancam on Sol 532. This target was measured to have 29% coarse hematite coverage. Image taken on Sol 532 (2005-07-02).

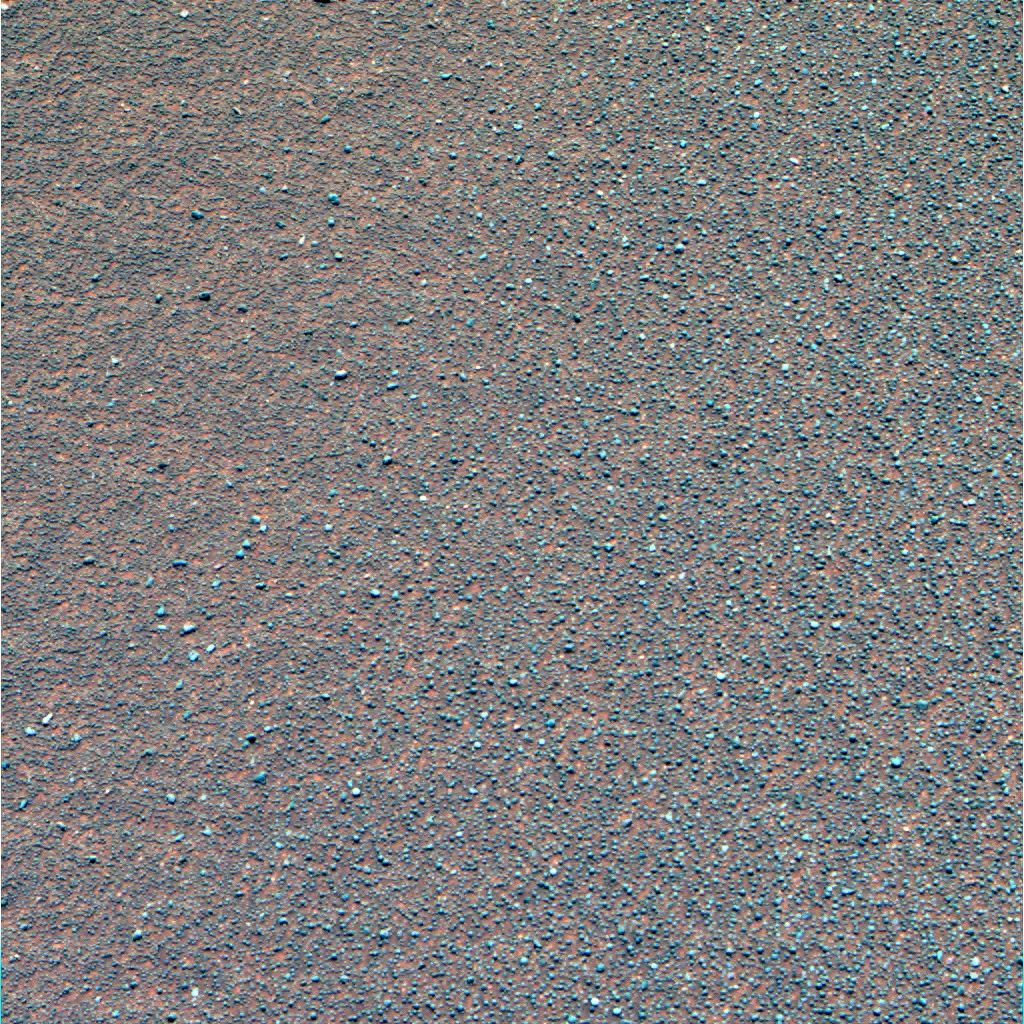
Figure 23. This is a false color version of Figure 22. The hematite spherules are easier to resolve in false color. Image taken on Sol 532 (2005-07-02).

The parts of the plain Opportunity studied are not special: Compared to the rest of Meridiani Planum, they do not have high surface hematite levels. To see this, look at the plain's surface hematite map (Figure 1b) and the small blue line (labeled OT) indicating the route of Opportunity's Traverse of the plain.

The mind-bogglingness of the number of loose hematite spherules hits when Figures 22 & 23 are extrapolated to the plain's whole surface area (about 150,000 km^{2}): 150,000 km^{2} is close to 2/3's the area of the main island of Japan (Honshu) and also 72% the area of the main island of the UK (Great Britain), it is also bigger than the land areas of 30 of the 50 states of the USA.

The number of embedded spherules (in the plain's sediments) is probably much higher than the number of loose spherules (on soils). Since (1) the estimates of the erosion depth of original sediment needed to produce the loose spherules are less than 1 meter, while (2) the typical depths of the plain's sediments are several hundred meters.

== Summary of evidence of water ==
Many lines of evidence indicate water either at Meridiani Planum today or in the distant past. Before giving a short summary of the major lines of evidence already provided above, a few more are introduced.

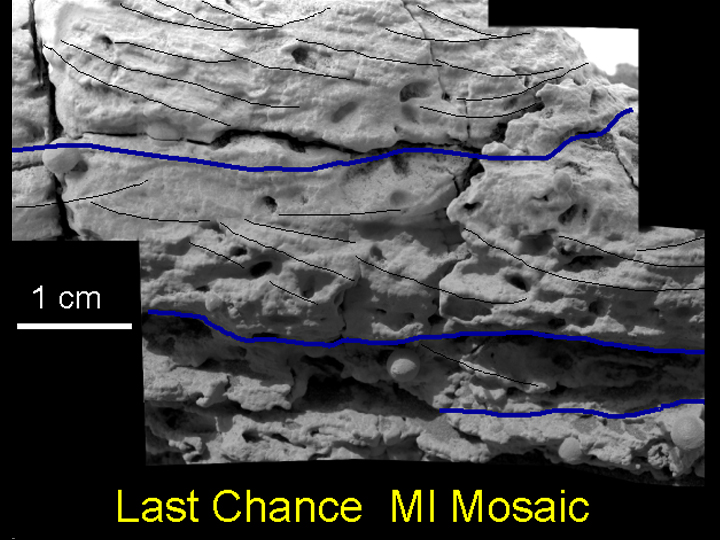
Figure 24. Cross-bedding features in "Last Chance" rock.

Some rocks showed small layers (laminations) with shapes only made by gently flowing water. The first such laminations were found in a rock called "The Dells." Geologists would say that the cross-stratification showed festoon geometry from transport in subaqueous ripples. Figure 24 illustrates cross-stratification, also called crossbedding.

The concentration of the element bromine in rocks was highly variable. This may be evidence of water. Bromine is very soluble and may have moved with water flows. Thin-film water frost deposition may have concentrated bromine in certain spots.

In mid-2004, thermal inertia signals (collected by the Mars Global Surveyor's TES) for "light-toned outcrop" (that is, outcrops of the plain's sediments) were found all over Meridiani Planum and also over extensive adjacent regions to the west, north, and east of the plain. Noting early results from Opportunity that the outcrop showed evidence of "long-term water interaction locally at the landing site", ref suggested the entire region with light-toned outcrop displayed evidence of past water.

Major lines of evidence for water:

The orbiting satellite evidence includes (A) the TES spectra for surface hematite (mapped in Figure 1b) since hematite only forms in watery conditions, and (B) the orbiting neutron detector's finding of fairly high levels of WEH over the plain and the adjacent regions (to the west, north, and east).

The deposition of sediments and the visible dried-up river valleys flowing into the plain's sediments are both strong evidence of ancient water flows in the Meridiani region.

The stratigraphic details of plain's sediments provide several lines of evidence for water, including cross-bedded sediments, the presence of vugs (cavities), and embedded hematite spherules that cut across sediment layers. The geochemical details of plain's sediments provide more lines of evidence for water, including the presence of large amounts of magnesium sulfate and other sulfate-rich minerals such as jarosite as well as chlorides.

== Endeavour Crater ==
At Endeavour Crater, Opportunity investigated the Homestake Vein, the Matijevic formation containing smectites, the Shoemaker formation composed of breccia at the crater rim, the Grasberg formation composed of clastics, and much else.

Homestake Vein:

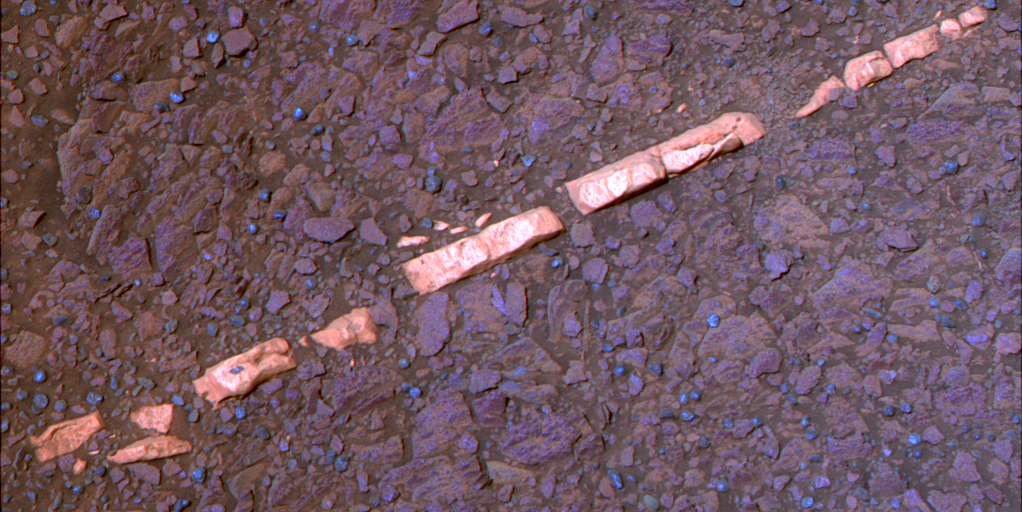
"Homestake" vein

In December 2011, Opportunity had driven onto the rim of Endeavour Crater and found a white vein identified as being pure gypsum. Tests confirmed that it contained calcium, sulfur, and water. It was formed when water carrying gypsum in solution deposited the mineral in a crack in the rock. The vein is called "Homestake." It is in a zone where the sulfate-rich sedimentary bedrock of the plains meets older, volcanic bedrock exposed at the rim of Endeavour.

== North of Meridiani Planum ==
A broad region north of the Meridiani plain displays layered features from orbit.

A detailed discussion of layering with many Martian examples can be found in Sedimentary Geology of Mars.

== Craters on Meridiani Planum ==
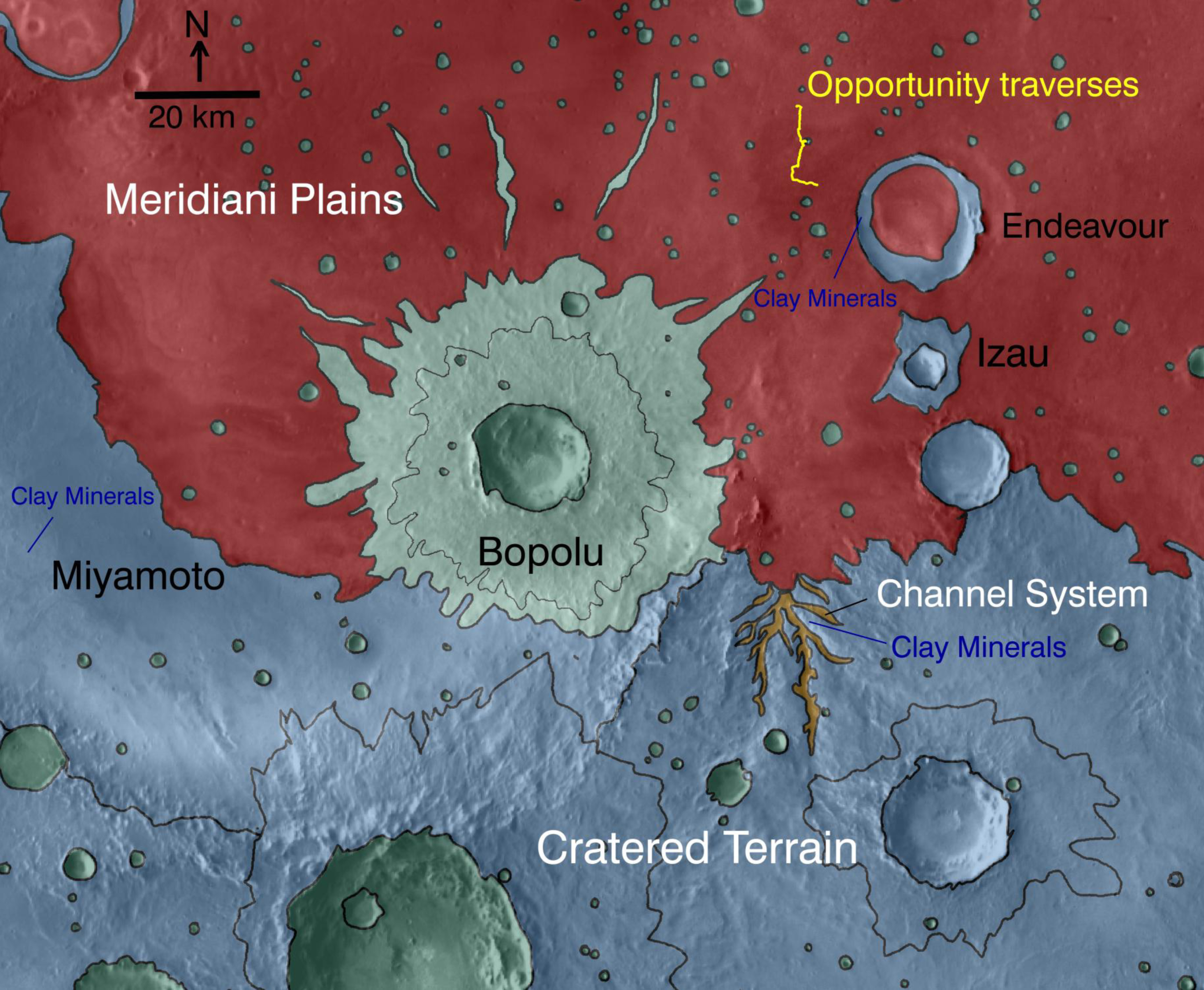
Color-coded for minerals and annotated

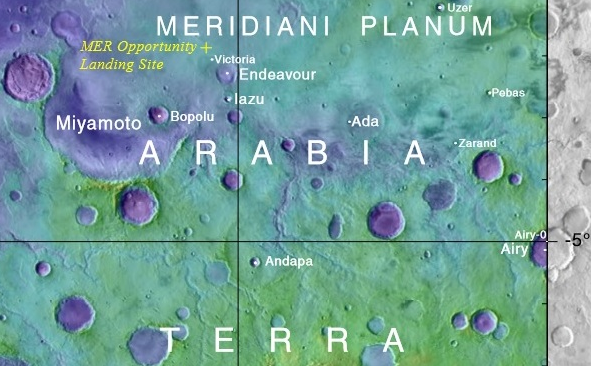
Annotated elevation map of Opportunity landing site and some surrounding craters including Endeavour and Miyamato

- Ada Crater
- Airy Crater – 40 kilometre (km) in diameter and about 375 km west-southwest of Opportunity
  - Airy-0 – Lies within the Airy crater, and defines the Martian Prime Meridian
- Argo Crater – Visited by Opportunity
- Beagle Crater – Visited by Opportunity
- Beer Crater
- Bopolu Crater
- Concepcion Crater - Visited by Opportunity
- Crommelin Crater
- Eagle Crater – Landing site of Opportunity (diameter 30 meters)
- Emma Dean Crater – Visited by Opportunity
- Endeavour Crater – Visited by Opportunity
- Endurance Crater – Visited by Opportunity
- Erebus Crater – Visited by Opportunity
- Firsoff Crater - Candidate landing site for 2020 rover mission
- Iazu Crater
- Mädler Crater
- Santa Maria Crater - Visited by Opportunity
- Victoria Crater – Visited by Opportunity (diameter 750 meters)
- Vostok Crater – Visited by Opportunity

== See also ==
- Geography of Mars
- List of plains on Mars
