= Mädler (disambiguation) =

Mädler may refer to:

- Johann Heinrich von Mädler (1794-1874), a German astronomer; and things named for him:
  - 65859 Mädler, an outer main-belt minor planet
  - Mädler (lunar crater)
  - Mädler (Martian crater)
