= Beer (Martian crater) =

Crater on Mars

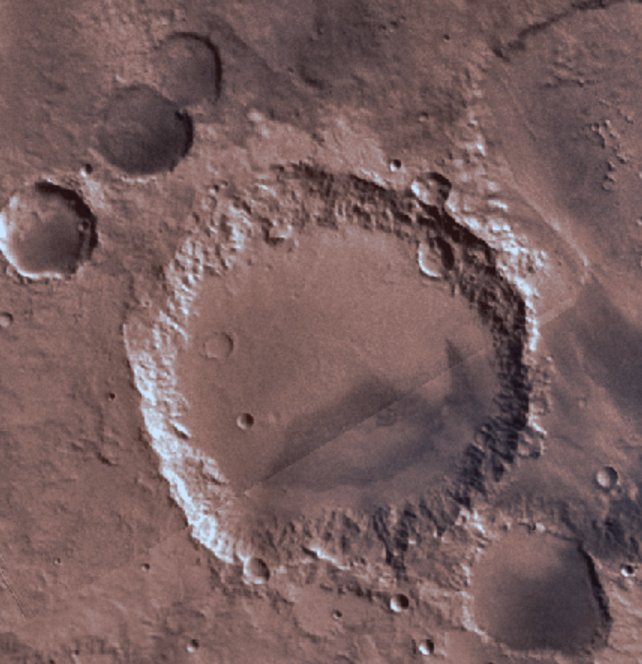
- Map of Beer Crater
- Planet: Mars
- Coordinates: 14.4°S 351.8°E
- Quadrangle: Margaritifer Sinus
- Diameter: 33.5 km
- Eponym: Wilhelm Beer

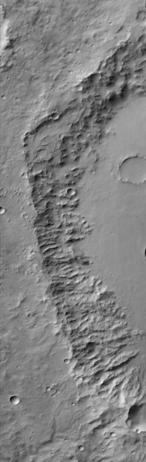
Beer Crater eroded west wall, as seen by CTX

Beer is an impact crater lying situated within the Margaritifer Sinus quadrangle (MC-19) region of the planet Mars, named in honor of the German astronomer, Wilhelm Beer. It is located at 14.4°S 351.8°E .

Beer and collaborator Johann Heinrich Mädler produced the first reasonably good maps of Mars in the early 1830s. When doing so, they selected a particular feature for the prime meridian of their charts. Their choice was strengthened when Giovanni Schiaparelli used the same location in 1877 for his more famous maps of Mars. The feature was later called Sinus Meridiani ("Middle Bay"), but following the landing of the NASA probe MER-B Opportunity in 2004 it is perhaps better known as Meridiani Planum. Currently the Martian prime meridian is the crater Airy-0.

Beer lies in the southwest of Meridiani Planum, about 8° from the prime meridian and about 10° west from the crater Mädler. Schiaparelli is also in the region.

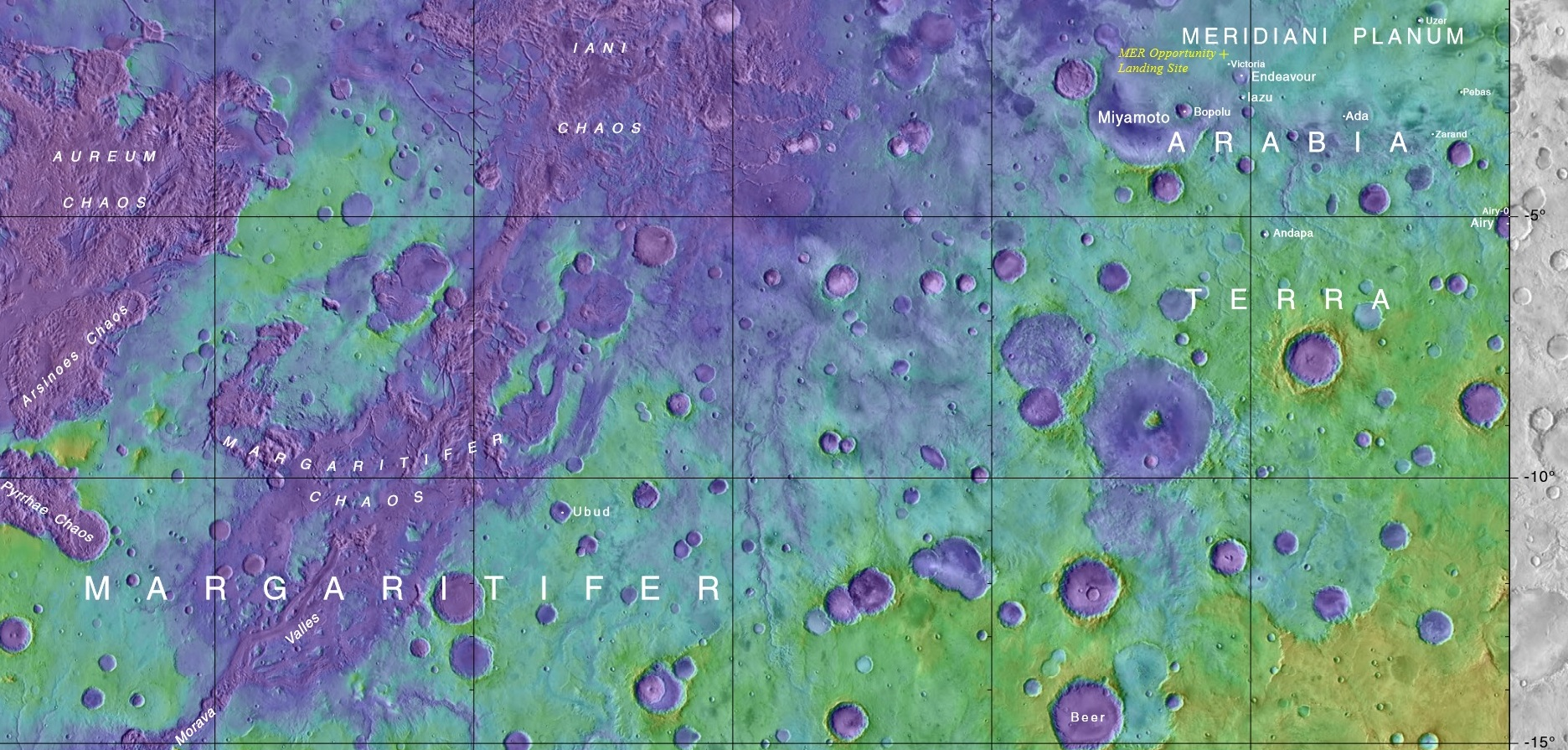
Map showing the location of Beer Crater and other, nearby features

== See also ==
- List of craters on Mars
