= Mädler (Martian crater) =

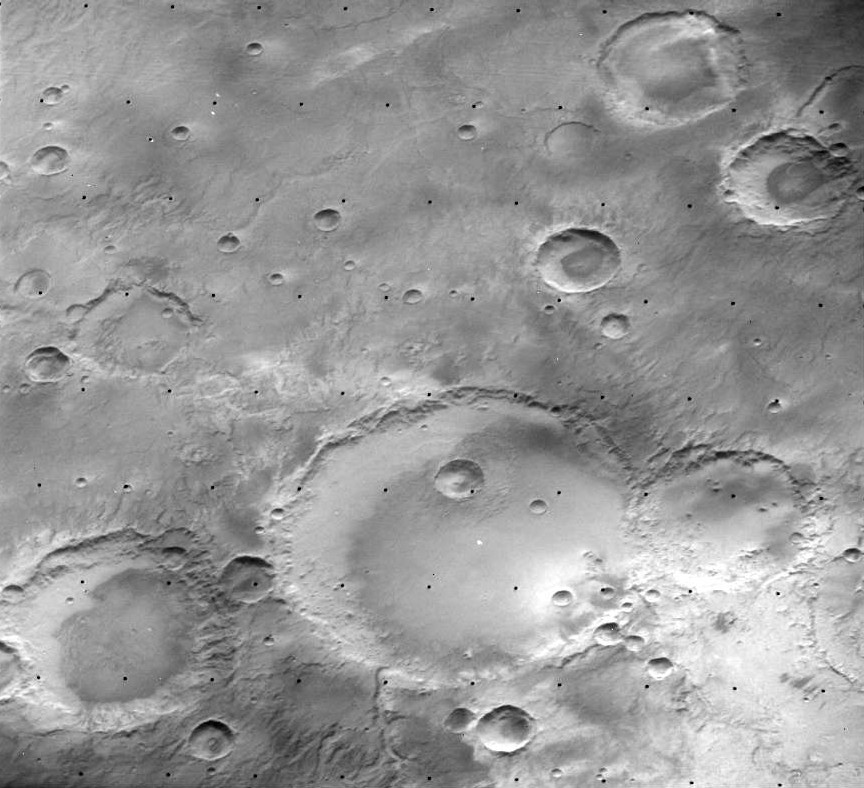
- Viking Orbiter 1 image with Mädler at bottom center. The outflow channel is clearly visible at the bottom (west).
- Planet: Mars
- Region: Sinus Sabaeus quadrangle
- Coordinates: 10.65°S 2.77°E
- Quadrangle: Sinus Sabaeus
- Diameter: 124.16 km
- Eponym: Johann Heinrich Mädler

Mädler is a crater on Mars. It was named in honor of the German astronomer Johann Heinrich Mädler by the IAU in 1973.

Mädler and collaborator Wilhelm Beer produced the first reasonably good maps of Mars in the early 1830s. When doing so, they selected a particular feature for the prime meridian of their charts. Their choice was strengthened when Giovanni Schiaparelli used the same location in 1877 for his more famous maps of Mars. The feature was later called Sinus Meridiani ("Middle Bay" or "Bay of the Meridian"), but following the landing of the NASA probe MER-B Opportunity in 2004 is perhaps better known as Meridiani Planum.

Mädler lies in the south of Meridiani Planum, close to the prime meridian and about 10° east of Beer. Schiaparelli is also in the region.

A valley-lake system called Markikh Vallis that once held water flowed into Mädler crater from the south, and formed a lake within Mädler and the adjacent, smaller crater to the southeast. The water flowed out of Mädler to the west and eventually to the northern plains.

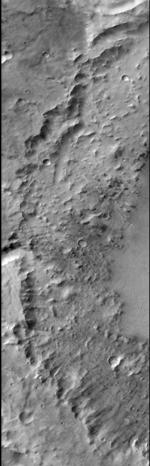
Eroded rim of Mädler crater, as seen by MRO's CTX.
