= Wilhelm Beer =

Prussian astronomer and banker

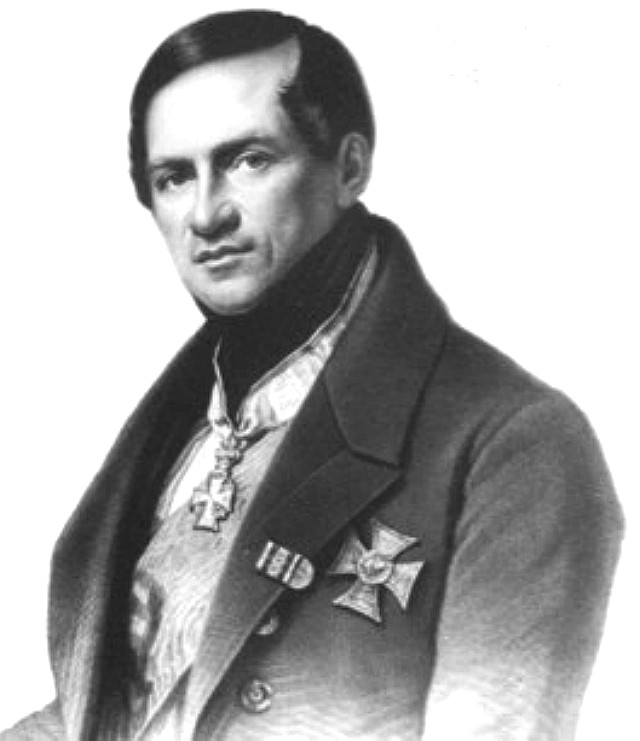
- Wilhelm Beer
- Born: 4 January 1797; Berlin, Prussia
- Died: 27 March 1850 (aged 53); Berlin, Prussia
- Scientific career
- Fields: astronomy

Wilhelm Wolff Beer (4 January 1797 – 27 March 1850) was a banker and astronomer from Berlin, Prussia, and the brother of Giacomo Meyerbeer.

== Astronomy ==
Beer's fame derives from his hobby, astronomy. He built a private observatory with a 9.5 cm refractor in Tiergarten, Berlin. Together with Johann Heinrich Mädler he produced the first exact map of the Moon (entitled Mappa Selenographica) in 1834–1836, and in 1837 published a description of the Moon (Der Mond nach seinen kosmischen und individuellen Verhältnissen). Both remained the best descriptions of the Moon for many decades.

In 1830, Beer and Mädler created the first globe of the planet Mars. In 1840 they made a map of Mars and calculated its rotation period to be 24 h 37 min 22.7 s, only 0.1 seconds different from the actual period as it is known today.

== Other work ==
In addition to his hobby of astronomy, he helped with the establishment of a railway system in Prussia, and promoted the Jewish community in Berlin. In his last decade of life, he worked as a writer and politician. In 1849 he was elected as an MP for the first chamber of the Prussian parliament.

== Named after Beer ==
The crater Beer on Mars is named in Wilhelm Beer's honor and lies near Mädler. There is also a crater called Beer on the Moon.
