= Johann Heinrich von Mädler =

German astronomer

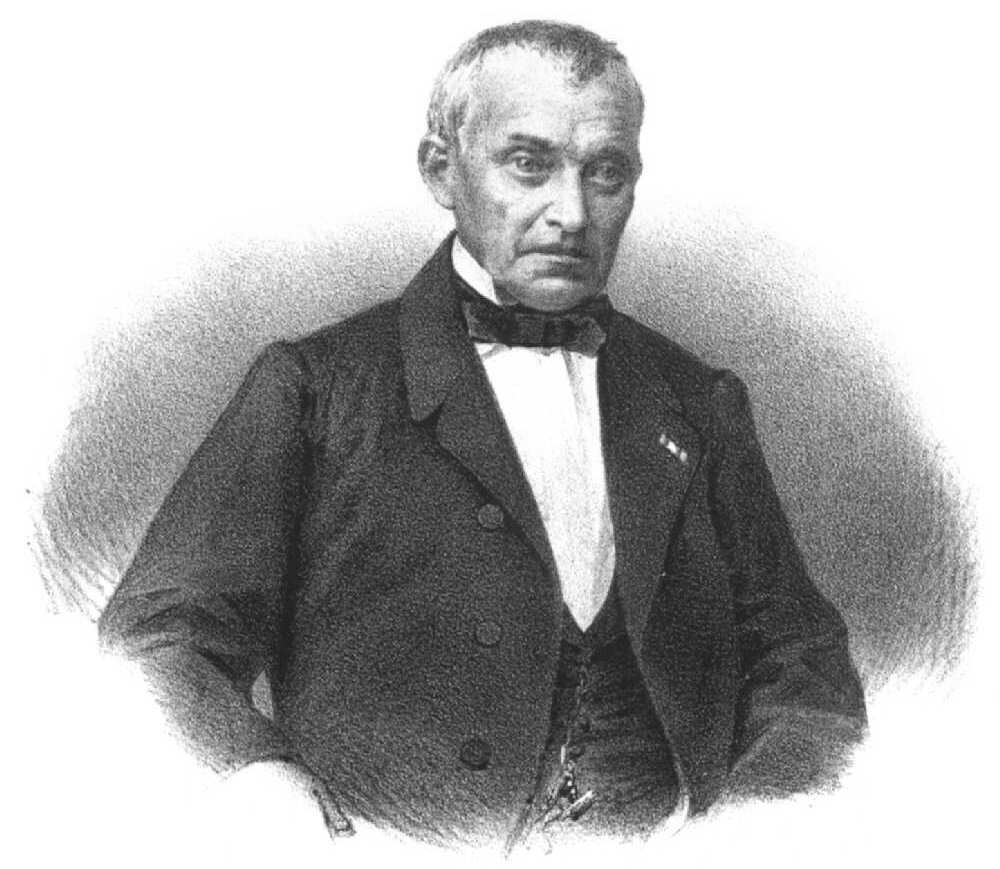
- Johann Heinrich von Mädler
- Born: 29 May 1794; Berlin
- Died: 14 March 1874 (aged 79)
- Scientific career
- Fields: astronomy

Johann Heinrich von Mädler (29 May 1794, Berlin – 14 March 1874, Hannover) was a German astronomer.

== Early life ==
His father was a master tailor and when 12 he studied at the Friedrich‐Werdersche Gymnasium in Berlin. He was orphaned at age 19 by an outbreak of typhus, and found himself responsible for raising three younger sisters. He began giving academic lessons as a private tutor and in this way met Wilhelm Beer, a wealthy banker, in 1824.

== Career ==
In 1829 Wilhelm Beer decided to set up a private observatory in Berlin, with a 95 mm refractor telescope made by Joseph von Fraunhofer, and Mädler worked there.

=== Mars ===
In 1830 Beer and Mädler began producing drawings of Mars which later became the first true maps of that planet. They were the first to choose what is today known as Sinus Meridiani as the prime meridian for Martian maps.

They made a preliminary determination for Mars's rotation period, which was off by almost 13 seconds. A later determination in 1837 was off by only 1.1 seconds.

=== Moon ===
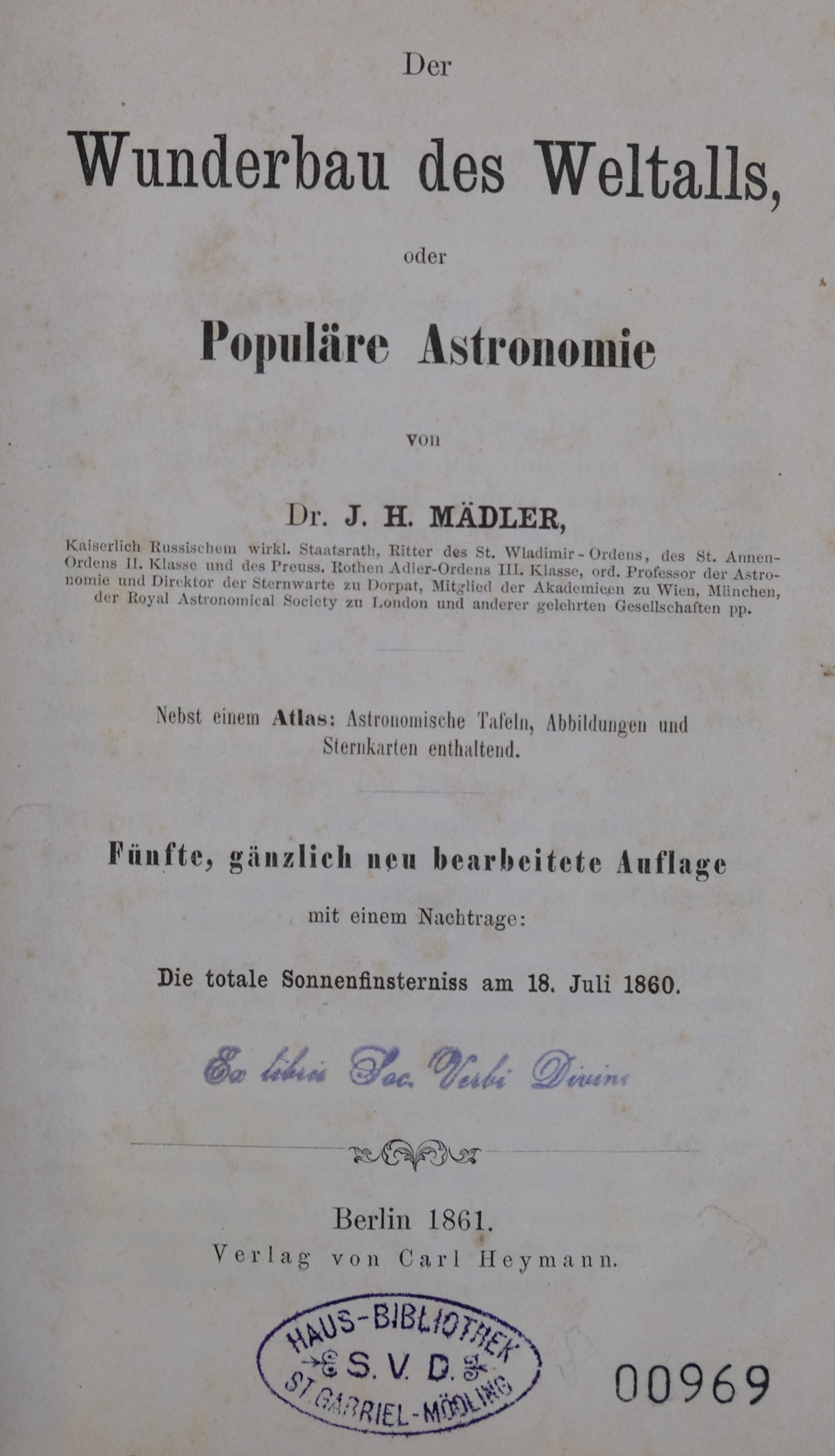
Title page to a 1861 first edition copy of "Der Wunderbau des Weltalls oder Populäre Astronomie"

Beer and Mädler also produced the first exact map of the Moon, Mappa Selenographica, published in four volumes in 1834–1836. In 1837 a description of the Moon (Der Mond) was published. Both were the best descriptions of the Moon for many decades, not superseded until the map of Johann Friedrich Julius Schmidt in the 1870s. Beer and Mädler drew the firm conclusion that the features on the Moon do not change, and there is no atmosphere or water.

=== Stars ===
In 1836, Johann Franz Encke appointed Mädler an observer at the Berlin Observatory, and he observed with its 240-mm refractor. In 1840, Mädler was appointed director of the Dorpat (Tartu) Observatory in Estonia (then Russian Empire), succeeding Friedrich Wilhelm Struve who had moved to Pulkovo Observatory. He carried out meteorological as well as astronomical observations. He continued Struve's observations of double stars. He remained in Tartu until he retired in 1865, and then returned to Germany.

By examining the proper motions of stars, he came up with his "Central Sun Hypothesis", according to which the center of the galaxy was located in the Pleiades star cluster and that the Sun revolves around it. He got the location wrong.

In 1858, he was one of the first persons to resolve the Olbers' paradox, indicating that a universe with a finite age could explain why the night sky is dark.

He published many scientific works, among them a two-volume History of Descriptive Astronomy in 1873. Mädlers Populäre Astronomie – Wunderbau des Weltalls ("Popular Astronomy – the Miraculous Architecture of the Universe") reached out to wider audiences; an eighth edition was published in 1885.

=== Calendar ===
In 1864, he proposed a calendar reform for Russia: After dropping 12 days to align with Gregorian calendar dates before the year 1900, the leap year in 1900 along with every 128th year afterwards (2028, 2156, etc.) under the Julian rules would be cancelled.

This would give a mean year of 365 days, 5 hours, 48 minutes, 45 seconds, which is extremely close to the mean tropical year. Neither the Tsar nor Orthodox clergy accepted this unsolicited proposal, though a modified version of it was made by Sergey Glazenap in 1900, and ultimately Russia would adopt the Gregorian calendar in 1918.

== Honors ==
The craters Mädler on the Moon and Mädler on Mars are both named in his honor.

== Bibliography ==
- Heino Eelsalu, Dieter B. Herrmann: Johann Heinrich Mädler (1794–1874): Eine dokumentarische Biographie. Akademie-Verlag Berlin, 1985 ISSN 0138-4600 (German)
