= List of surface features of Mars visited by Spirit and Opportunity =

Features recorded by 2004–2018 missions

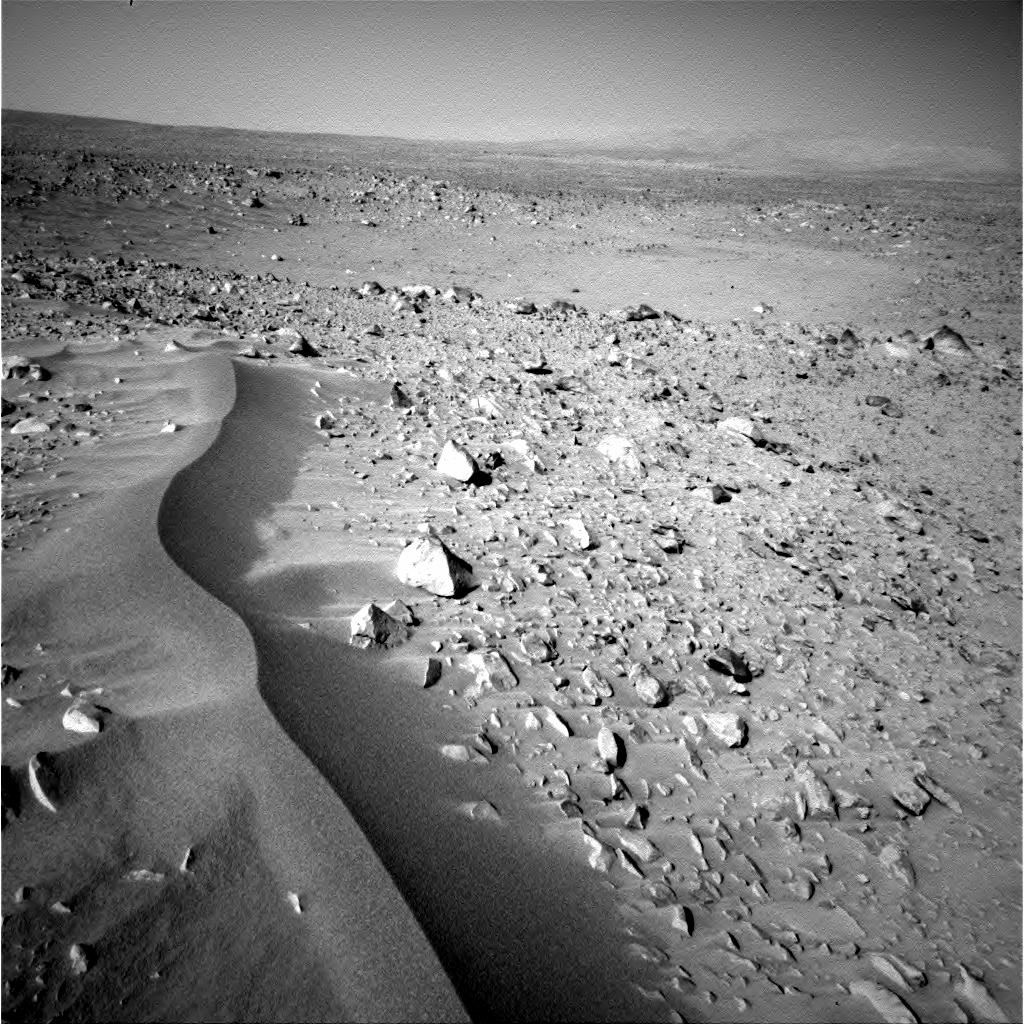
The crater Lahonten near the Columbia Hills, photographed by the Spirit navcams in May 2004

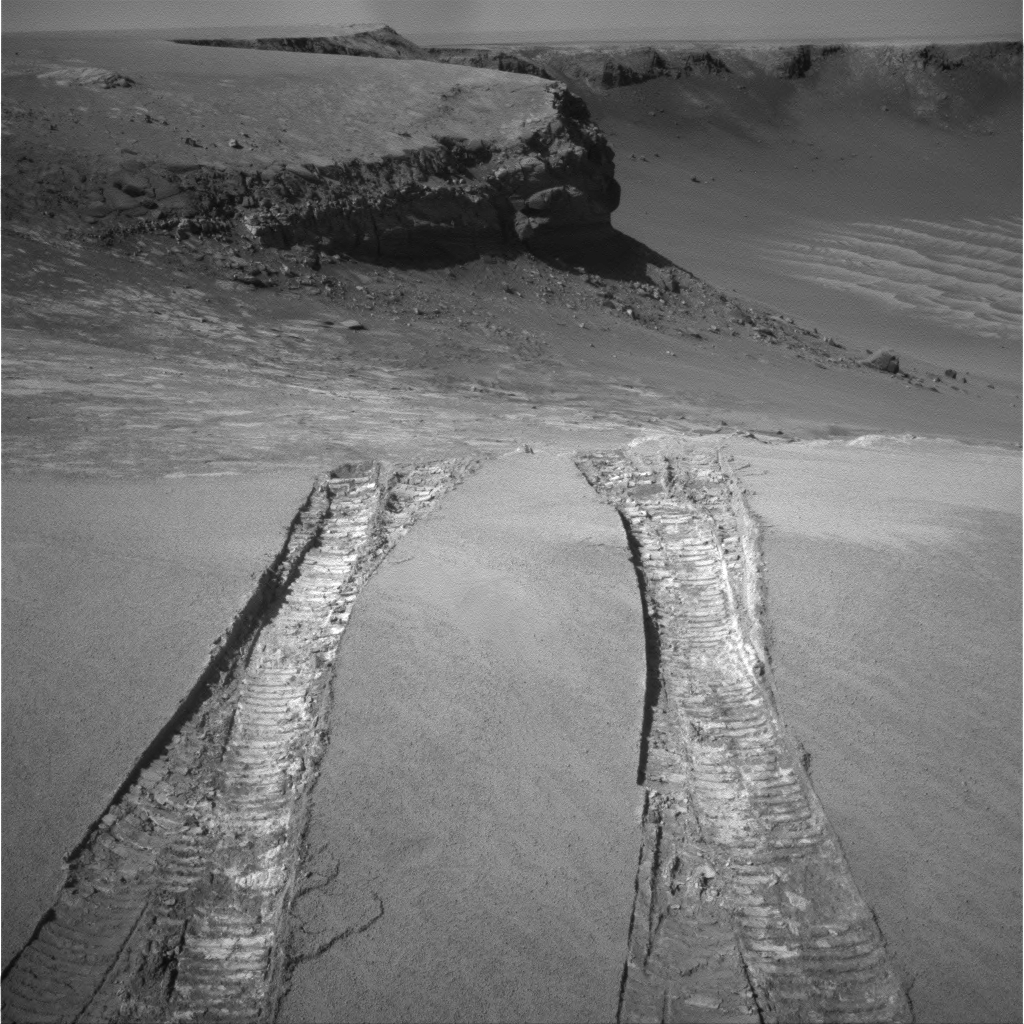
Cape Verde at the crater Victoria, photographed by the Opportunity navcams in August 2008

The Mars Exploration Rover mission successfully landed and operated the rovers Spirit and Opportunity on the planet Mars from 2004 to 2018. During Spirit's six years of operation and Opportunity's fourteen years of operation, the rovers drove a total of 52 kilometres (32 miles) on the Martian surface, visiting various surface features in their landing sites of Gusev crater and Meridiani Planum, respectively.

== Spirit ==
=== Hills ===
- Apollo 1 Hills
  - Grissom Hill
- Columbia Hills
  - Husband Hill
  - McCool Hill

=== Craters ===
- Bonneville crater
- Gusev crater
- Thira crater

=== Rocks ===
- Adirondack
- Home Plate
- Humphrey
- Pot of Gold

=== Miscellaneous ===
- Larry's Lookout
- Sleepy Hollow

== Opportunity ==
=== Craters ===
- Argo crater
- Beagle crater
- Bopolu crater
- Concepción crater
- Eagle crater
- Emma Dean crater
- Endeavour (crater)
  - Cape Tribulation
    - Marathon Valley
  - Cape York
    - Greeley Haven
  - Solander Point
- Endurance crater
- Erebus crater
- Fram crater
- Naturaliste crater
- Nereus crater
- Santa Maria crater
- Victoria crater
  - Cape Verde
- Vostok crater

=== Rocks ===
- Block Island meteorite
- Bounce Rock
- El Capitan
- Heat Shield Rock
- Last Chance
- Mackinac Island meteorite
- Matijevic Hill
- Oileán Ruaidh
- Shelter Island meteorite

== See also ==
- List of craters on Mars
- List of rocks on Mars
