= Shelter Island meteorite =

Meteorite on Mars

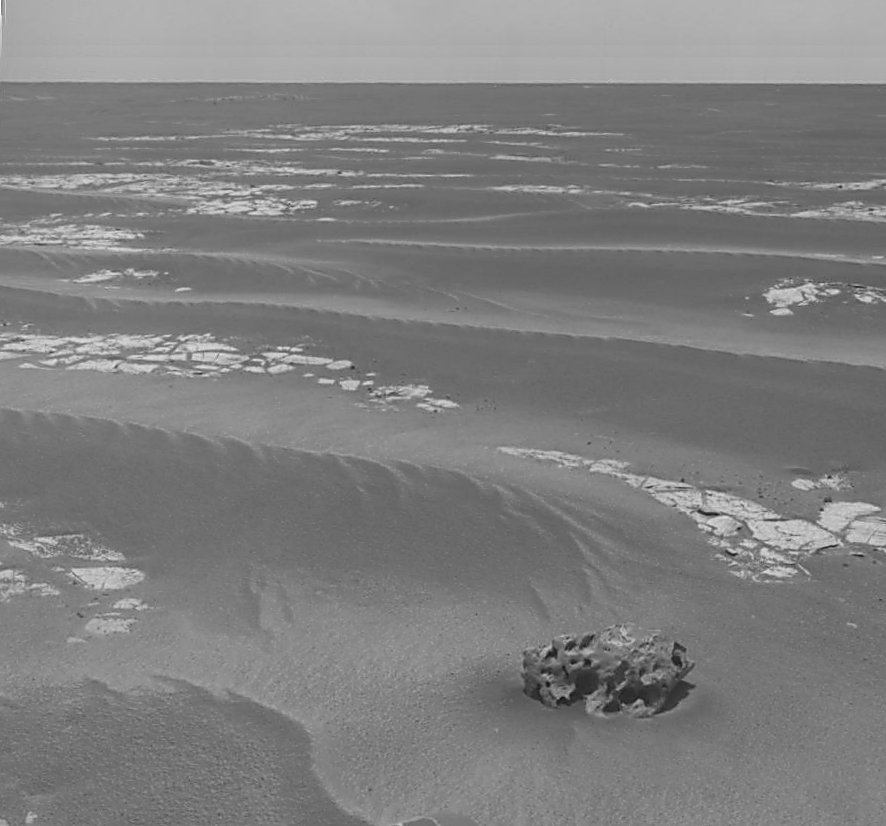
- Shelter Island meteorite viewed by the Opportunity rover (October 3, 2009).
- Type: Iron
- Parent body: Unknown
- Composition: Kamacite, taenite
- Weathering grade: Large-scale, cavernous weathering
- Country: Mars
- Region: Meridiani Planum
- Coordinates: 02°07′04″S 05°31′41.30″W
- Observed fall: No
- Fall date: Possibly late Noachian
- Found date: December 1, 2009
- Strewn field: Possibly
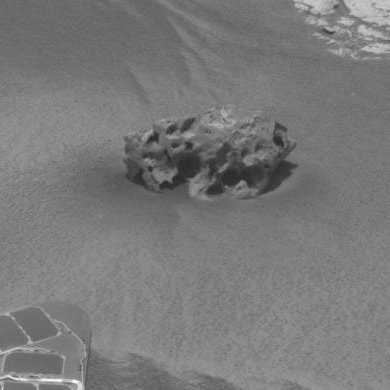
- Shelter Island meteorite - close-up (October 1, 2009).
- Related media on Wikimedia Commons

Shelter Island meteorite was found on Mars by the Opportunity rover on October 1, 2009. It is about 27 centimetres (11 in) long.

== History ==
Shelter Island was the second of three iron meteorites encountered by the rover on Meridiani Planum within a few hundred meters, the others being Block Island and Mackinac Island.

Shelter Island may have fallen on Mars in the late Noachian period and is extensively weathered.

== See also ==
- Atmospheric reentry
- Bounce Rock
- Glossary of meteoritics
- Heat Shield Rock
- List of Martian meteorites
- List of meteorites on Mars
- List of rocks on Mars
- Oileán Ruaidh meteorite
- List of surface features of Mars imaged by Opportunity
