= Mackinac Island meteorite =

Martian meteorite

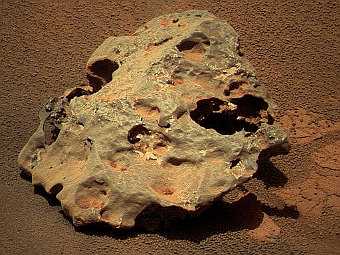
- Type: Iron
- Parent body: Unknown
- Composition: Nickel, iron, Kamacite, taenite
- Weathering grade: Large-scale, cavernous weathering
- Country: Mars
- Region: Meridiani Planum
- Coordinates: 02°07′02″S 05°31′22.43″W
- Observed fall: No
- Fall date: Possibly late Noachian
- Found date: 2009-10-13
- Strewn field: Possibly
- Related media on Wikimedia Commons

Mackinac Island meteorite is a meteorite that was found on Mars by the Opportunity rover on October 13, 2009.

== History ==
Mackinac Island was the third of three iron meteorites encountered by the rover on Meridiani Planum within a few hundred meters, the others being Shelter Island and Block Island.

Mackinac Island may have fallen on Mars in the late Noachian period and is extensively weathered.

== See also ==
- Atmospheric reentry
- Bounce Rock
- Glossary of meteoritics
- Heat Shield Rock
- List of Martian meteorites
- List of meteorites on Mars
- List of rocks on Mars
- Oileán Ruaidh meteorite
- List of surface features of Mars imaged by Opportunity
