= Block Island meteorite =

Iron meteorite on Mars

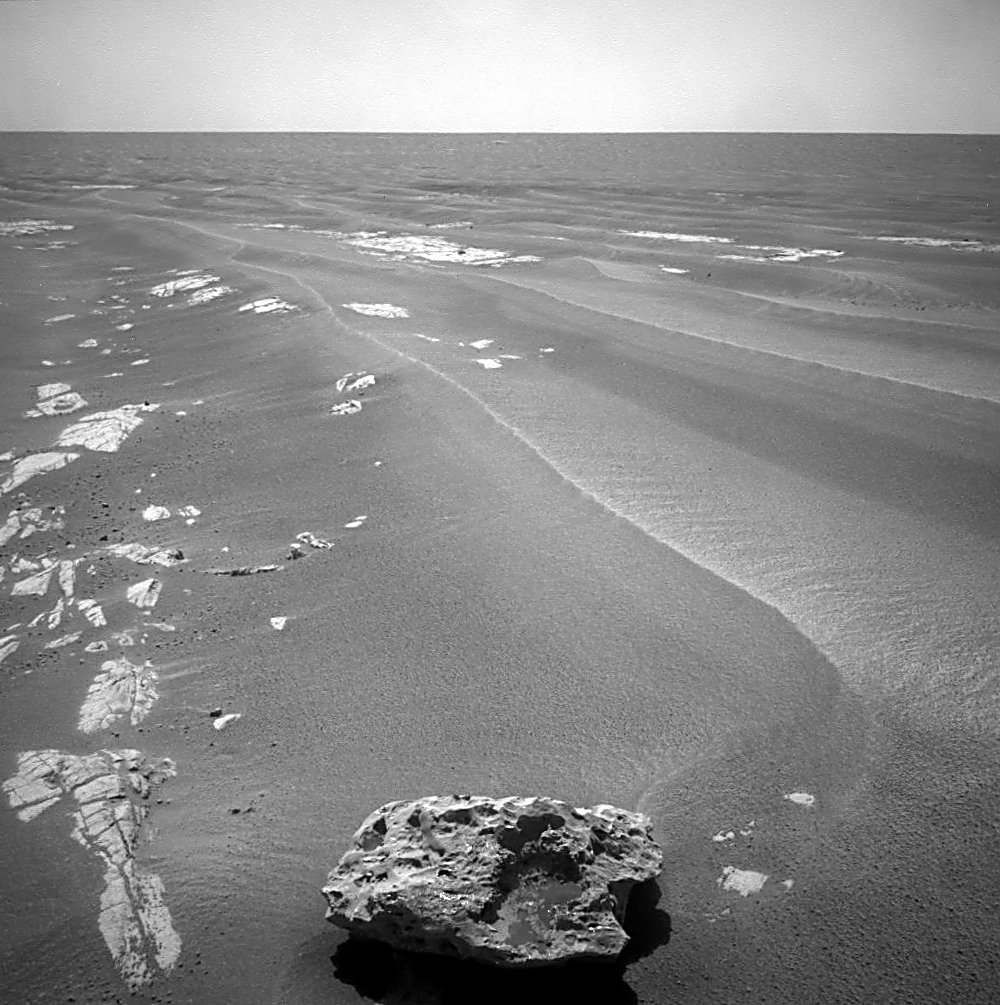
- Type: Iron
- Parent body: Unknown
- Composition: Nickel, iron, Kamacite, taenite
- Weathering grade: Large-scale, cavernous weathering
- Country: Mars
- Region: Meridiani Planum
- Coordinates: 02°07′00.85″S 05°31′02.85″W
- Observed fall: No
- Fall date: Possibly late Noachian
- Found date: July 17, 2009
- TKW: >0.5 short tons (0.45 t)
- Strewn field: Possibly
- Alternative names: Meridiani Planum 006, MP 006
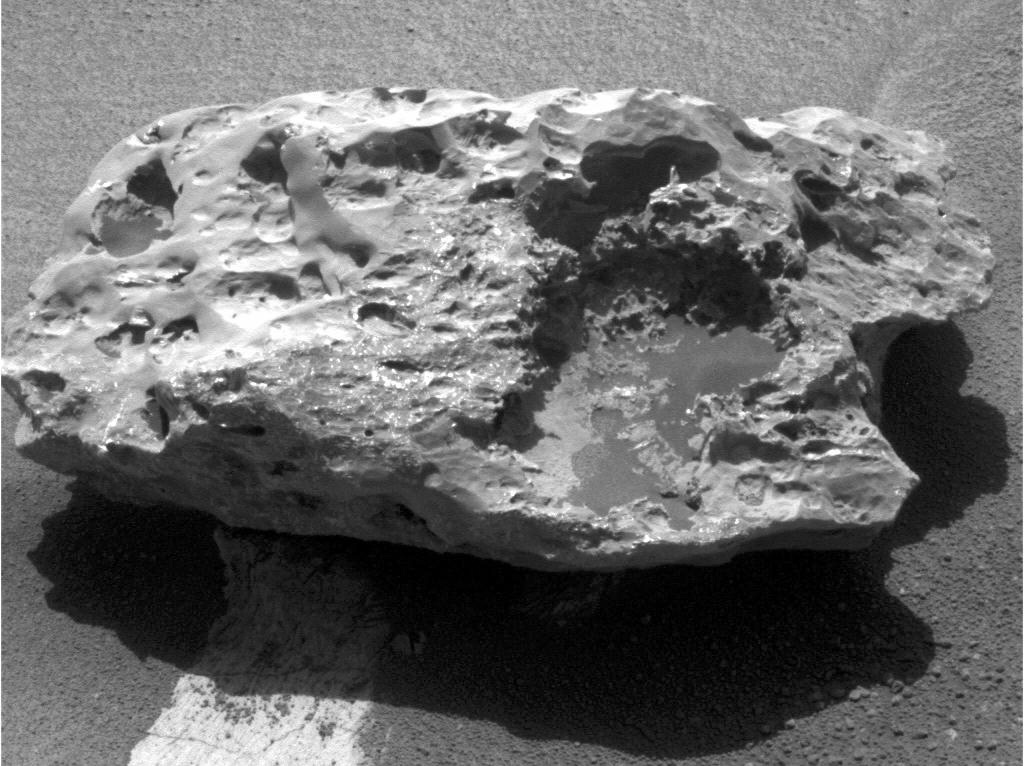
- Block Island in close up.
- Related media on Wikimedia Commons

Block Island meteorite, officially named Meridiani Planum 006 shortened as MP 006, was found on Mars by the Opportunity rover on July 17, 2009. It is about 67 centimetres (26 in) across.

== History ==
Block Island was the first of three iron meteorites encountered by the rover on Meridiani Planum within a few hundred meters, the others being Shelter Island (the second meteorite found), and Mackinac Island (the third one found).

No strong evidence exists concerning when Block Island may have fallen on Mars, though atmospheric conditions would have favored its arrival in the late Noachian period. Block Island may be extensively weathered, or conversely the features covering it may simply be the regmaglypts formed by its passage through the atmosphere. Contrary to some claims, Block Island is not too large for the modern Martian atmosphere to produce, though the denser the atmosphere the more effectively it would produce Block Island mass meteorites.

== See also ==
- Atmospheric reentry
- Bounce Rock
- Glossary of meteoritics
- Heat Shield Rock
- List of Martian meteorites
- List of meteorites on Mars
- List of rocks on Mars
- Oileán Ruaidh meteorite
