= El Capitan (Mars) =

Rock outcrop on Mars

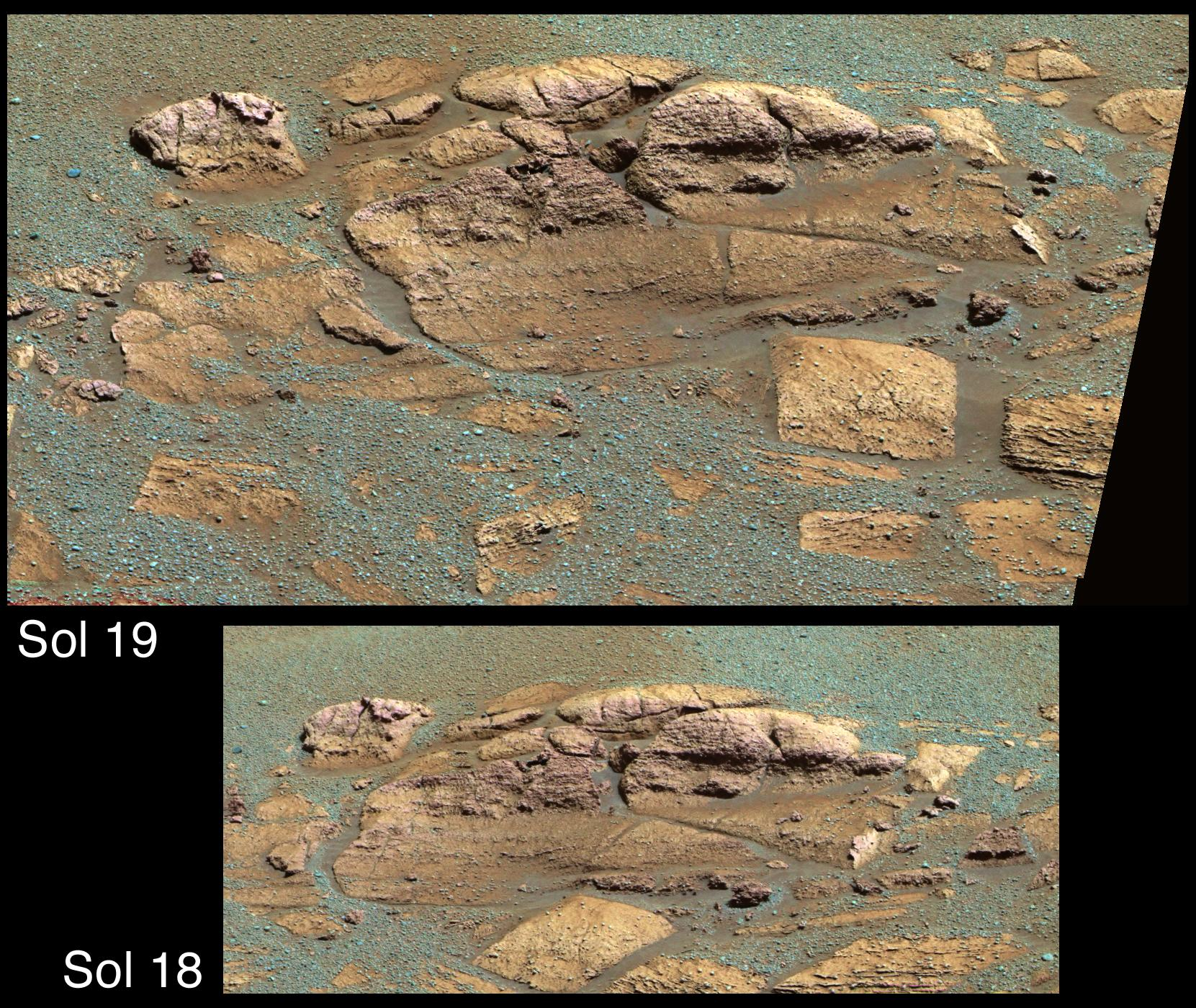
- El Capitan rock outcrop at Meridiani Planum, Mars
- Feature type: Rock outcrop
- Coordinates: 1.9°S 354.5°E

El Capitan is a layered rock outcrop found within the Margaritifer Sinus quadrangle (MC-19) region of the planet Mars, this geological outcrop was first discovered and observed by the Mars Exploration Rover Opportunity in February 2004. The rock outcrop was named for El Capitan, a topographical mountain lying within the state of Texas.

== See also ==
- List of rocks on Mars
- Eagle (crater)
- List of surface features of Mars imaged by Opportunity
