= Last Chance (Mars) =

Rock outcrop on Mars

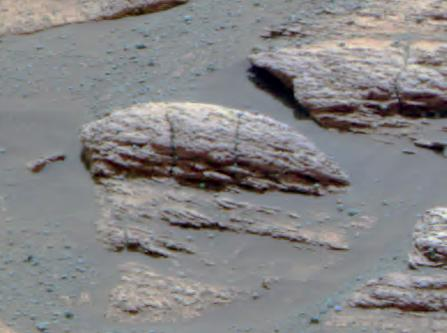
- Last Chance rock outcrop on Mars.
- Feature type: Rock outcrop
- Coordinates: 1.9°S 354.5°E

Last Chance is a layered rock outcrop found within the Margaritifer Sinus quadrangle (MC-19) region of the planet Mars, discovered by the Mars Exploration Rover Opportunity in March 2004. The rock lies within the outcrop near the rover's landing site at Meridiani Planum, Mars.

Images returned show evidence for a geologic feature known as ripple cross-stratification. At the base of the rock, layers can be seen dipping downward to the right. The bedding that contains these dipping layers is only one to two centimeters (0.4 to 0.8 inches) thick. In the upper right corner of the rock, layers also dip to the right, but exhibit a weak "concave-up" geometry. These two features—the thin, cross-stratified bedding combined with the possible concave geometry—suggest small ripples with sinuous crest lines. Although wind can produce ripples, they rarely have sinuous crest lines and never form steep, dipping layers at such a small scale. The most probable explanation for these ripples is that they were formed in the presence of moving water.

== See also ==
- List of rocks on Mars
- List of surface features of Mars imaged by Opportunity
