= Bathurst Inlet (rock) =

Rock on the surface of Aeolis Palus on Mars

Bathurst Inlet Rock
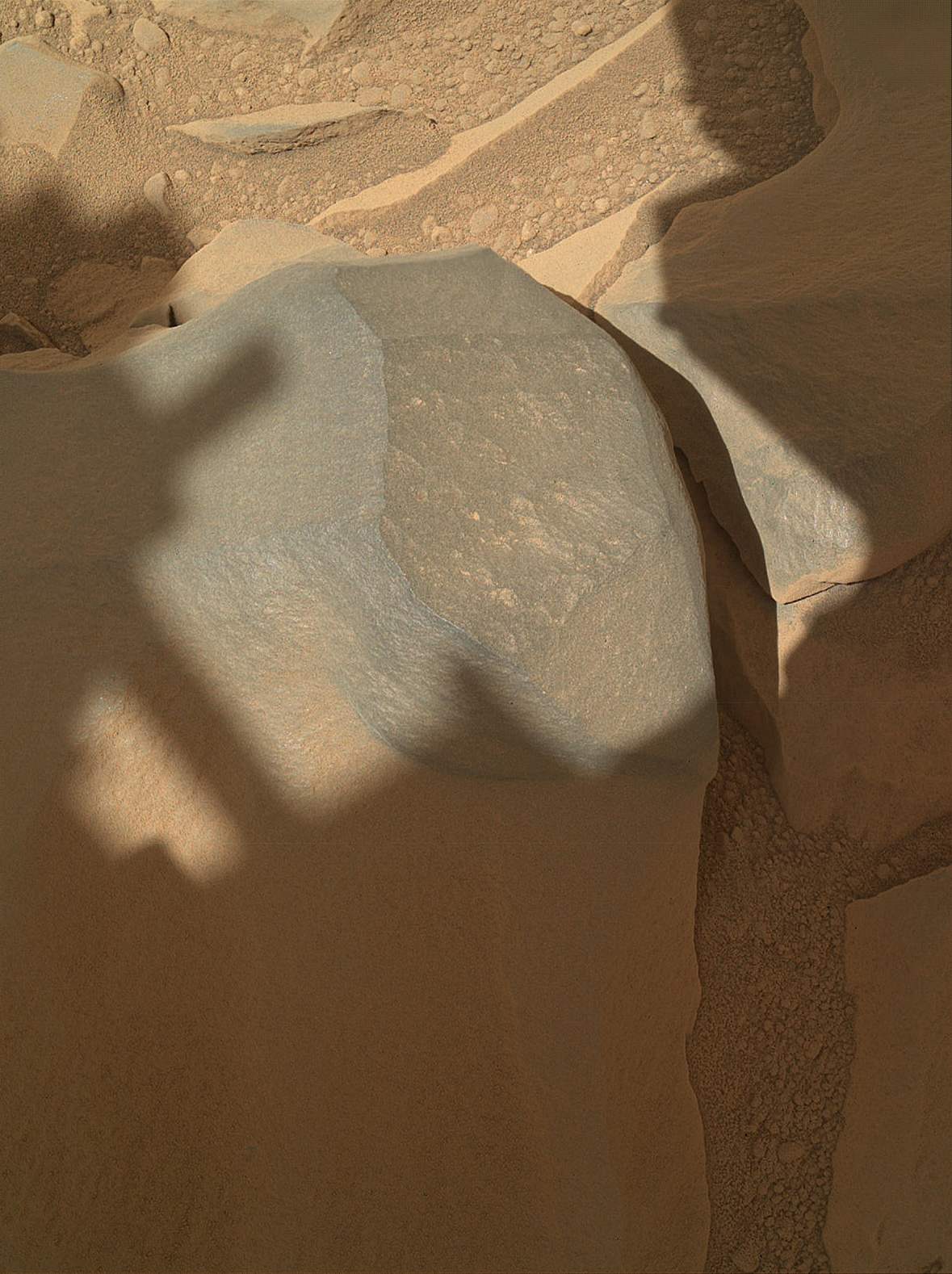
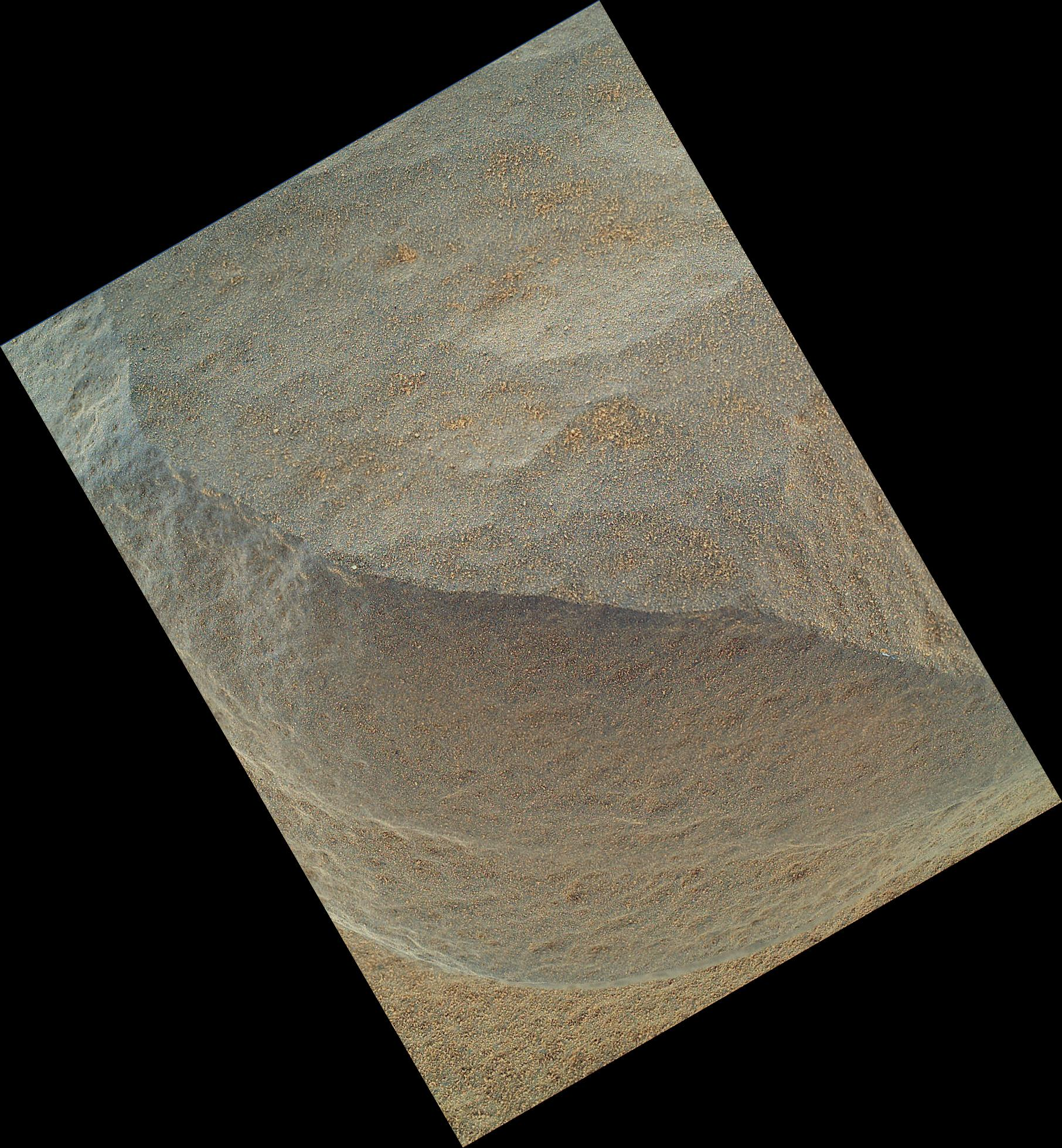
- Images taken by the Curiosity rover (September 30, 2012). (Above) Context view area 16 cm (6.3 in) x 12 cm (4.7 in); (Below) Close-Up view area 3.3 cm (1.3 in) x 2.5 cm (0.98 in).
- Feature type: Rock
- Coordinates: 4.59°S 137.44°E

Bathurst Inlet is a rock on the surface of Aeolis Palus, between Peace Vallis and Aeolis Mons ("Mount Sharp"), in Gale crater on the planet Mars. The rock was encountered by the Curiosity rover on the way from Bradbury Landing to Glenelg Intrigue on September 30, 2012 and was named after Bathurst Inlet, a deep inlet located along the northern coast of the Canadian mainland. The "approximate" site coordinates are: 4.59°S 137.44°E.

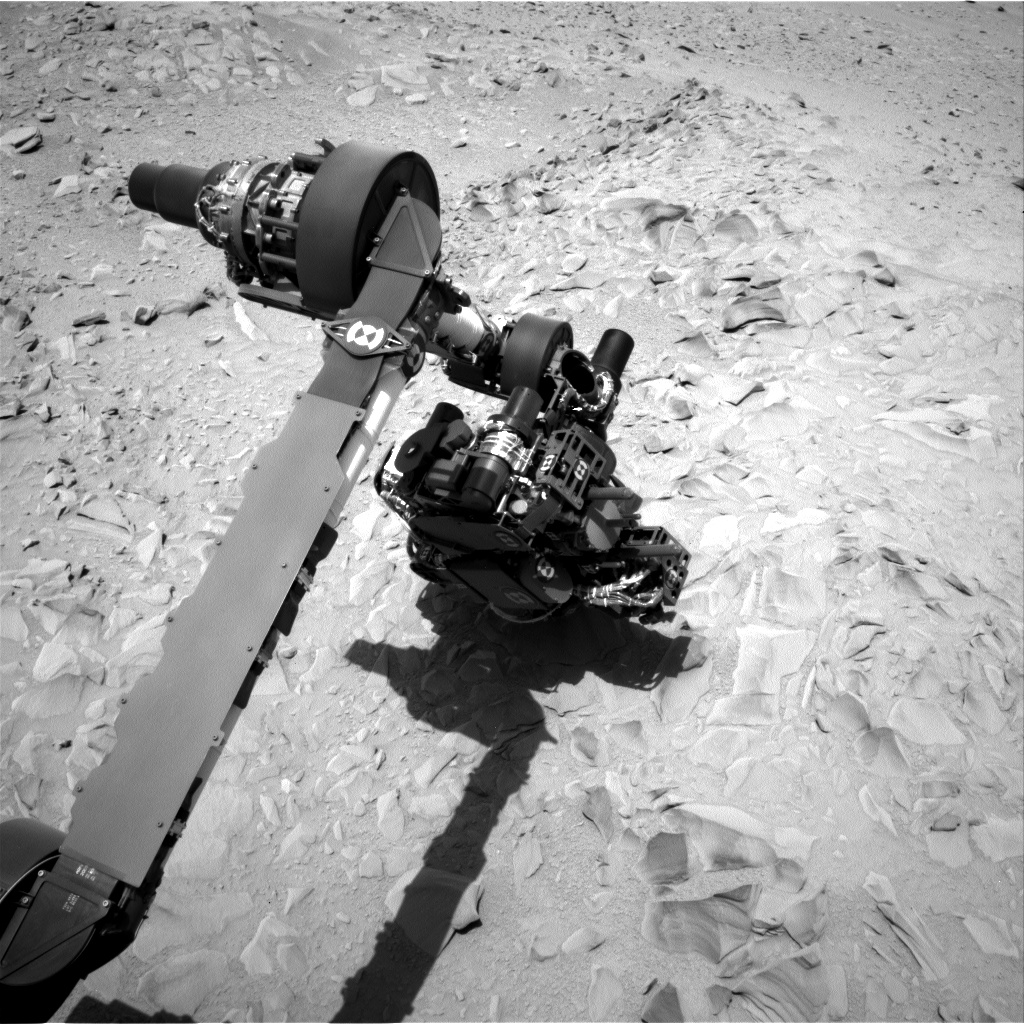
The Curiosity rover inspecting Bathurst Inlet rock on Mars.

The NASA rover team had assessed the rock to be a suitable target for one of the first uses of Curiosity's contact instruments, the Mars Hand Lens Imager (MAHLI) and the Alpha particle X-ray spectrometer (APXS). The rock is dark gray and seems to contain grains or crystals, if any at all, that are finer than Curiosity's cameras can resolve: less than 80 μm in size.

== See also ==
- Aeolis quadrangle
- Composition of Mars
- Geology of Mars
- List of rocks on Mars
- Timeline of Mars Science Laboratory
