= 2018 Mars global dust storm =

Intense dust storm occurring on Mars in 2018

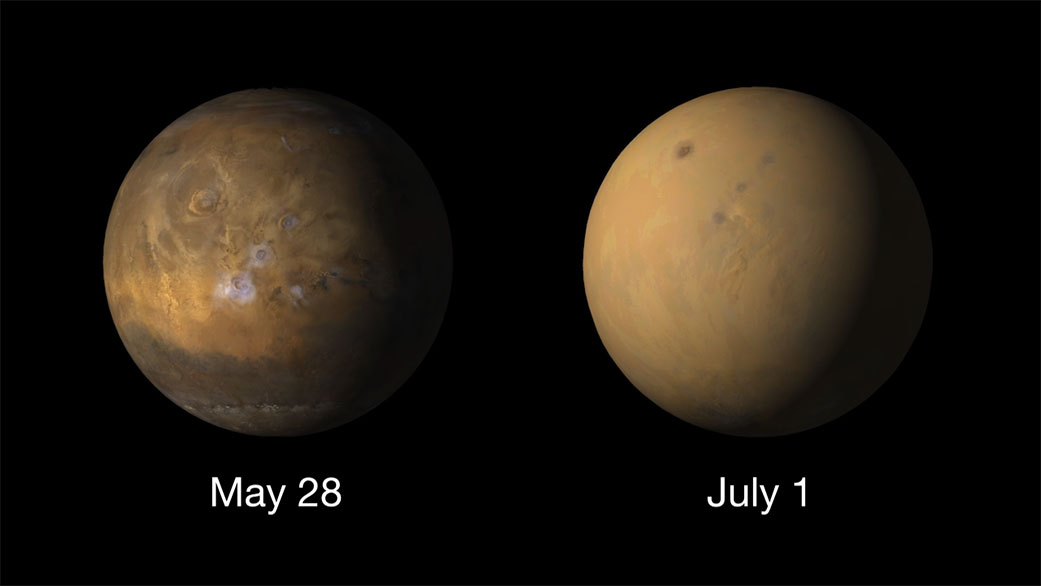
Mars before and after the dust storm

Mars before and after/during the 2018 global dust storm (animation)

The 2018 Mars global dust storm was a massive and planet-wide dust storm that affected the surface of Mars between May and July 2018. It became one of the most intense, discussed and widespread storms in the history of Mars observations, with its impact felt across the entire planet. The storm was notable for its rapid development and extreme size, eventually enveloping the planet entirely and lasting for several weeks.

== History ==
The storm initially started as a smaller regional dust storm in the planet's northern hemisphere in late May 2018, being first detected on May 31. By mid-June, it had escalated, covering most of the planet's surface. It was fueled by atmospheric conditions, due to the strong thermal contrast between regolith and ice-covered surfaces.

The dust storm reached its peak intensity by June 2018, when it expanded to cover the entire planet. The storm caused a high decrease in visibility, with the dust layer reducing the amount of sunlight and reaching practically the entire Martian surface. The dust optical depth reached up to τ=5, with local values reaching τ=10 or even higher. By the end of July 2018, the dust storm began to dissipate, and sunlight gradually began to penetrate the atmosphere again.

One of the most significant impacts of the 2018 dust storm was on NASA’s Opportunity rover, which had been operational on Mars since 2004. The rover was severely affected by the storm's extreme dust and the resulting drop in sunlight. With solar panels unable to recharge the rover's batteries due to the dust blocking sunlight, Opportunity entered a low-power hibernation mode to conserve energy. Attempts to re-establish contact with the rover were unsuccessful, and Opportunity was declared lost in February 2019 after months of silence.

Other Mars missions, such as NASA's Curiosity rover and the InSight lander, were not directly impacted by the storm. These missions continued to operate, although they experienced some atmospheric effects such as reduced solar power generation. Curiosity, for instance, had to rely on its nuclear-powered battery more heavily during the storm period.
