= Pot of Gold (Mars) =

Rock in Gusev Crater on Mars

Pot of Gold Rock
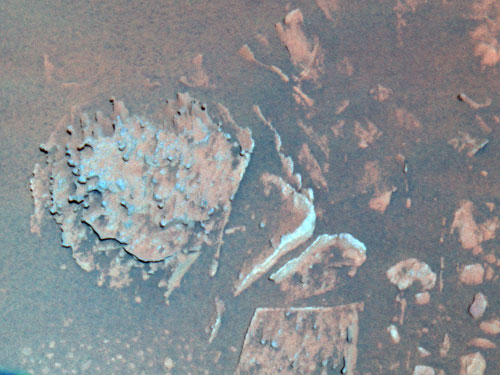
- The knobby "Pot of Gold" rock on Mars.
- Feature type: Rock
- Coordinates: 14.6°S 175.5°E

Pot of Gold is the nickname for a knobby, softball-sized rock in Gusev Crater on Mars. During an examination by the Mars Exploration Rover Spirit on June 25, 2004, hematite was first detected by Spirit, suggesting a watery past on Mars.

== See also ==
- List of rocks on Mars
