= Solander Point =

North end of Endeavour crater on Mars

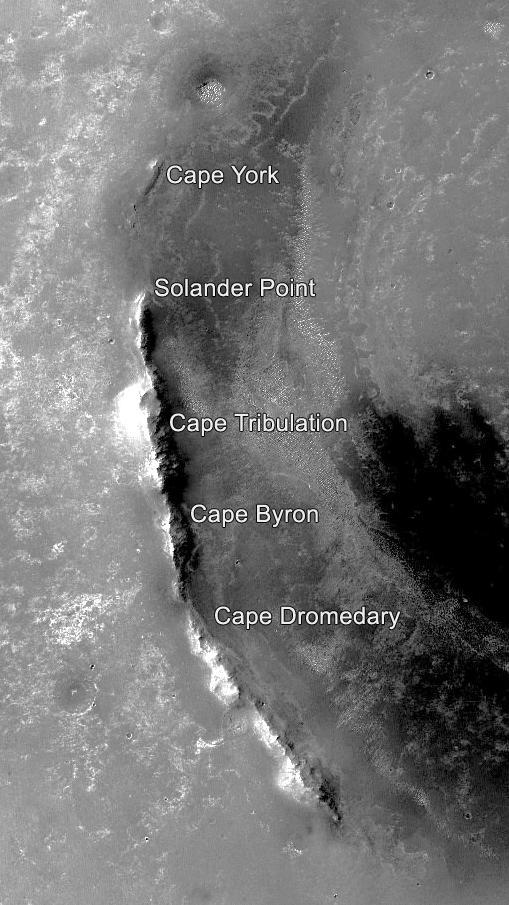
Annotated map with location of Solander Point, on Endeavour crater's western rim

Solander Point is at the north end of the west-southwestern ridgeline of Endeavour crater on the planet Mars. It is named after the Swedish scientist Daniel Solander, who was the first university-educated scientist to set foot on Australian soil at Botany Bay in 1770.

Solander Point was visited in 2013 by the Mars Exploration Rover-B Opportunity, a robotic rover that was active on Mars from 2004-2018.

By early July 2013 Opportunity was approaching it from the North, after previously examining outcrops on the northwest edge of the crater, north of Solander. The rover drove south from Cape York through Botany Bay to travel to Solander. By July 2, 2013, it was about half-way there. The area was imaged from Martian orbit by HiRISE on July 8, 2013, data which aids the rover team in understanding the terrain and planning rover traverses. The rover made good time on its approach to Solander, giving Opportunity time to investigate a curious area of terrain in the crater. At the start of August, the rover was less than 100 meters (328 ft) from Solander, and arrived at its base in the following days. Its arrival signaled the availability of a northward facing slope, useful for angling to collect more sunlight during the Martian winter. In October and November 2013, the rover climbed up the north end of Solander. By December 2013, the rover reached the top of Solander point hill as the 10 year anniversary of its landing on Mars neared. After Solander point Opportunity moved along Murray Ridge, and then south to Cape Tribulation.

Between Solander Point and, to north of it Cape York, both of which are raised up, is a lower area that is noted to be a part of the Burns Formation. The Burns Formation extends all the way back to Opportunity's landing site by Eagle crater, and it was heavily studied prior to this time by the rover. The Burns Formation is "high in sulfate bearing minerals" according to NASA. Solander Point lies at the geological contact line between the Burns Formation, and what is thought to be an even older geological region.

== Solander point ==
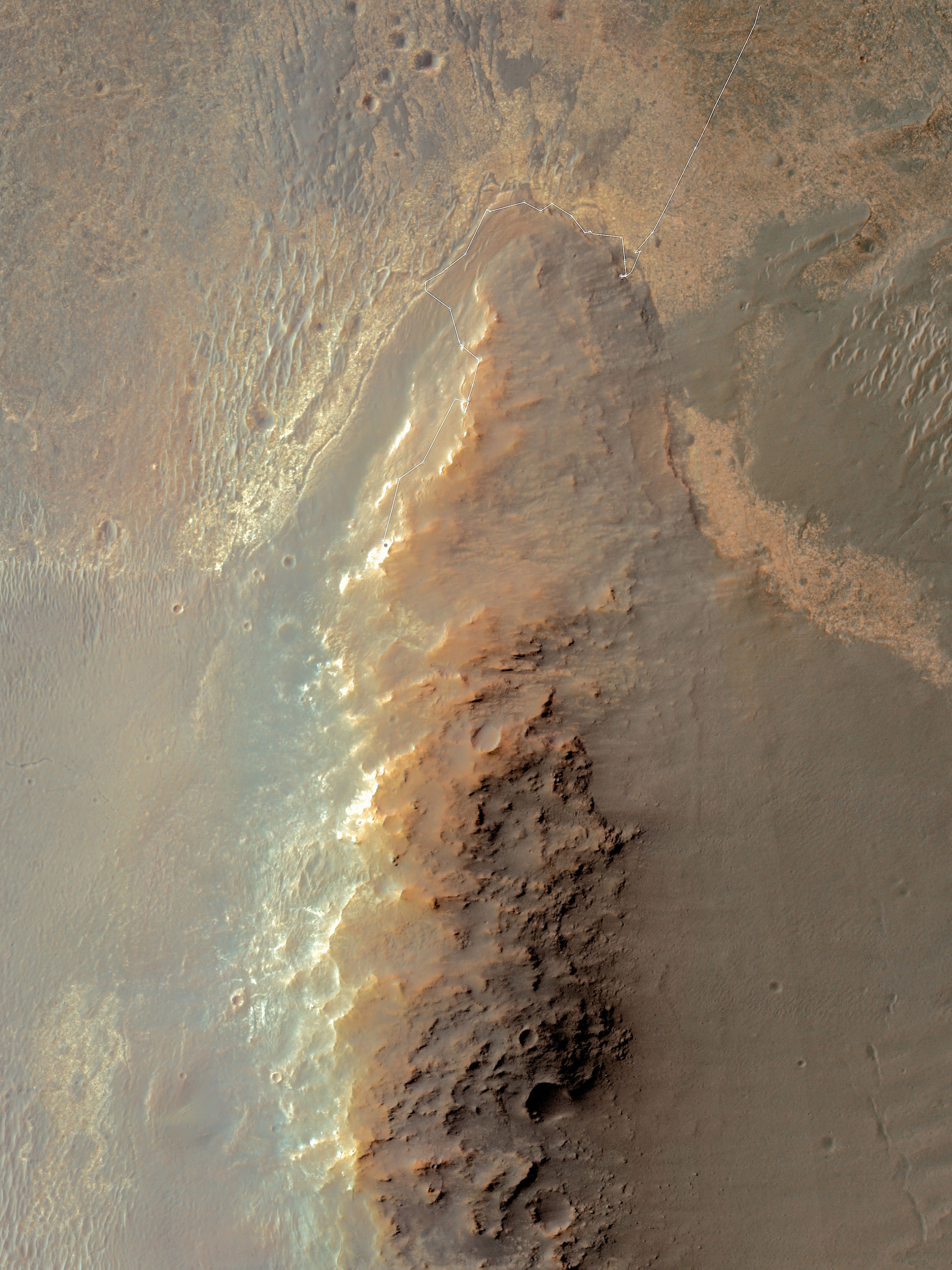
Solander Point with MER-B rover track November 2013

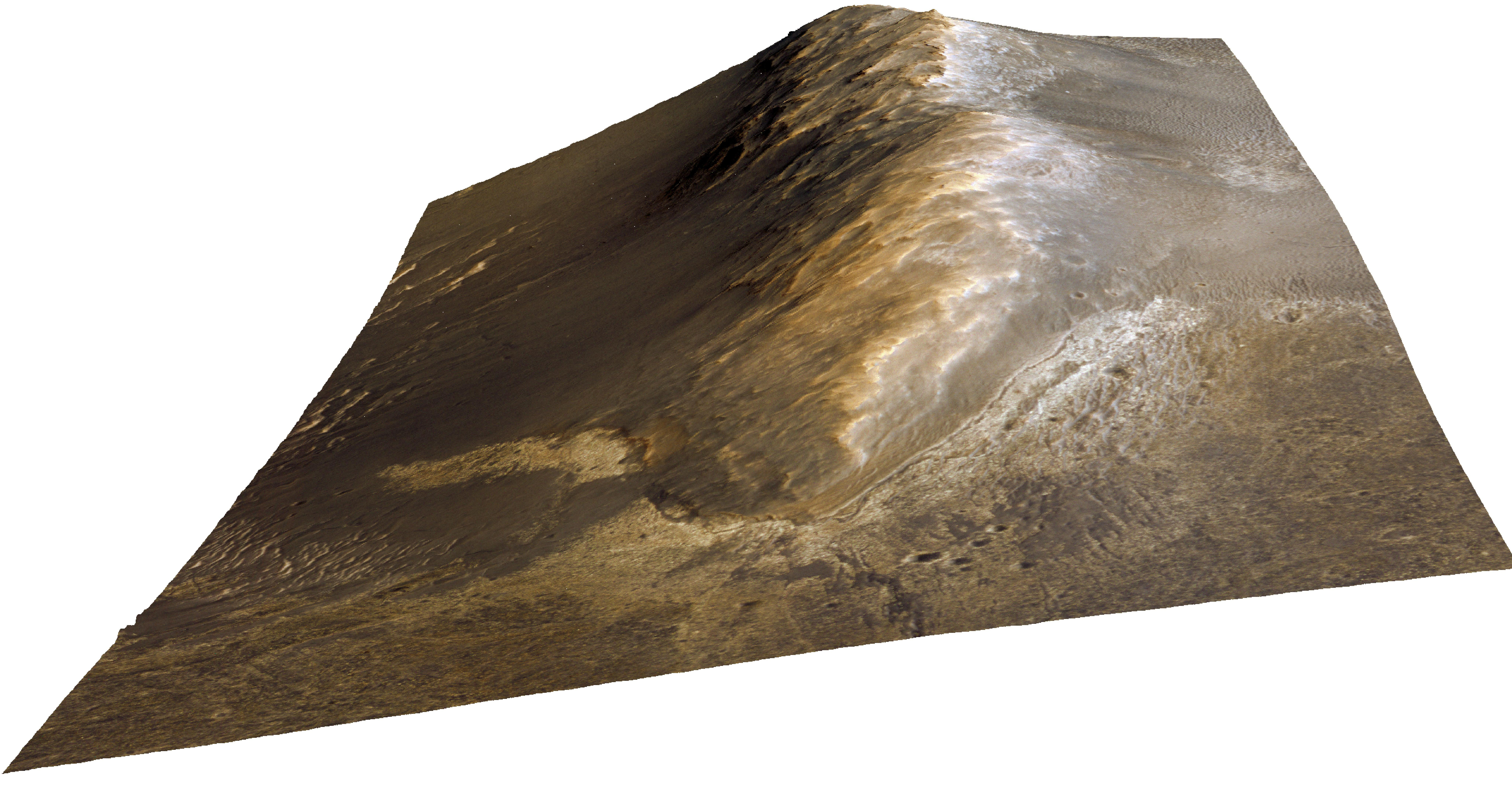
Looking south on Solander Point with the crater floor to the left

== Map showing journey of MER-B near Solander Point ==
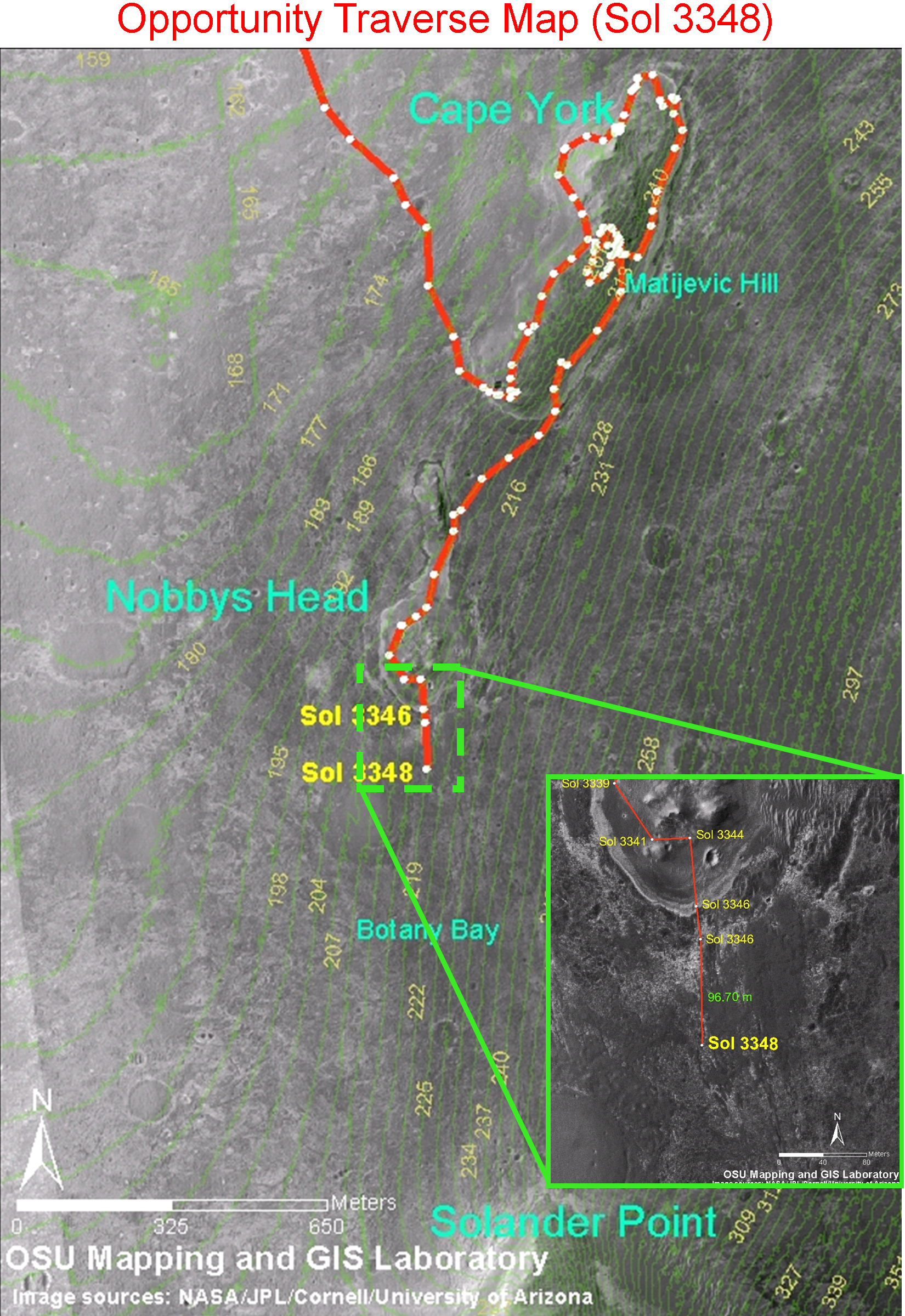
MER-B's arrival and subsequent path around Cape York, and finally its departure as it headed south into Botany Bay towards Solander Point

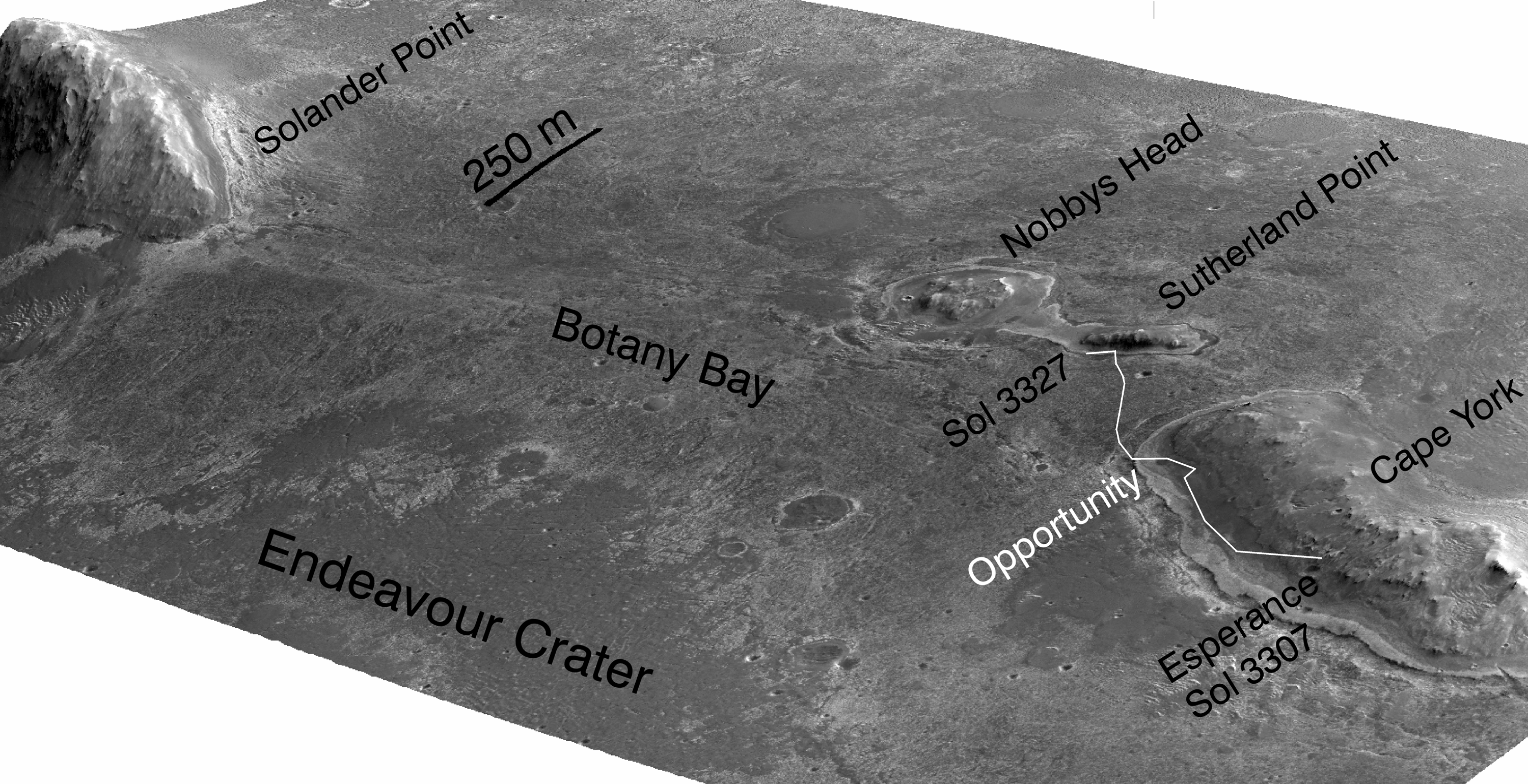
A different view of its path towards Solander

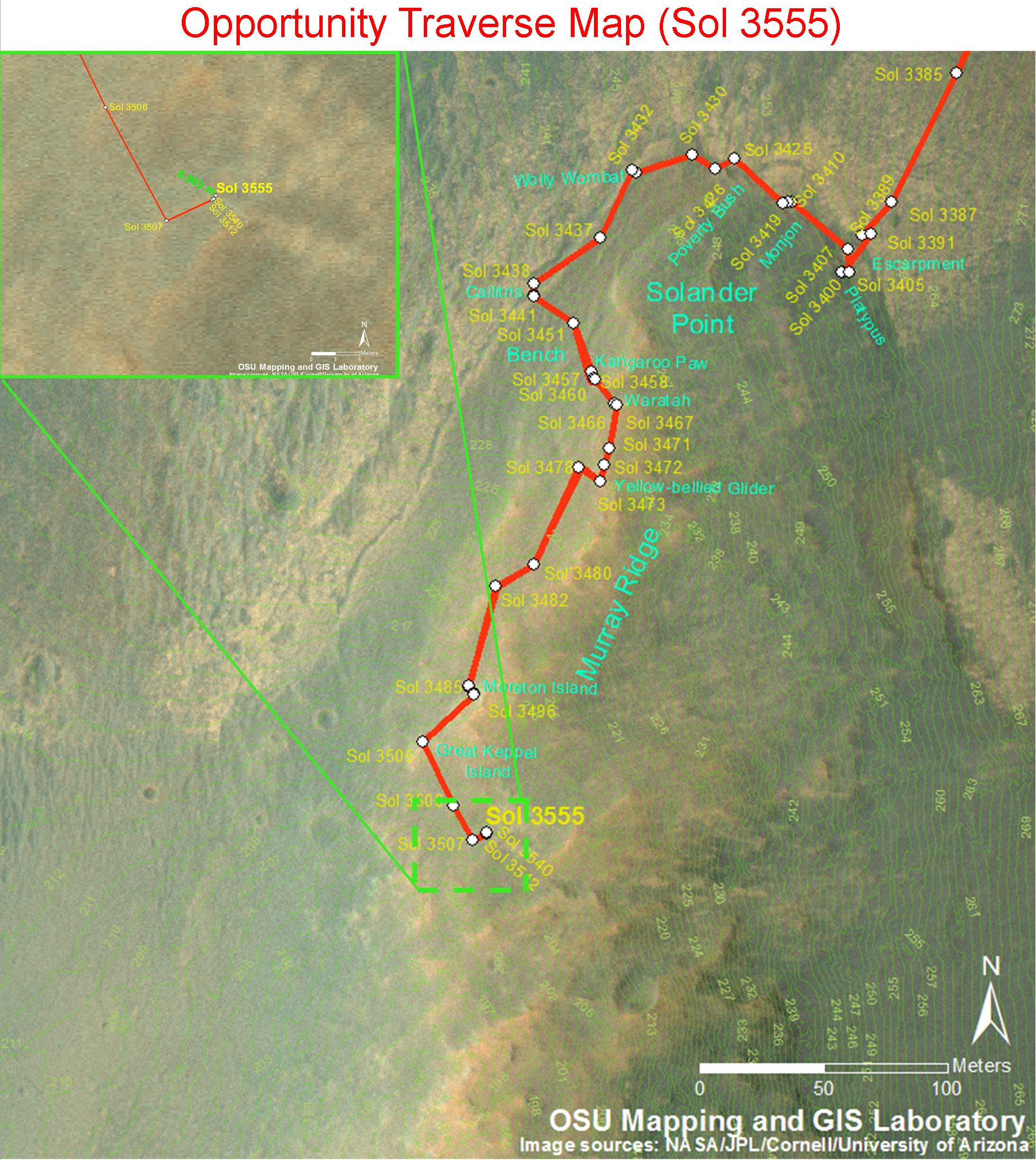
MER-B's path to Solander Point, and then down along Murray Ridge. (Up to February 2014)

== Geological regions around Solander ==
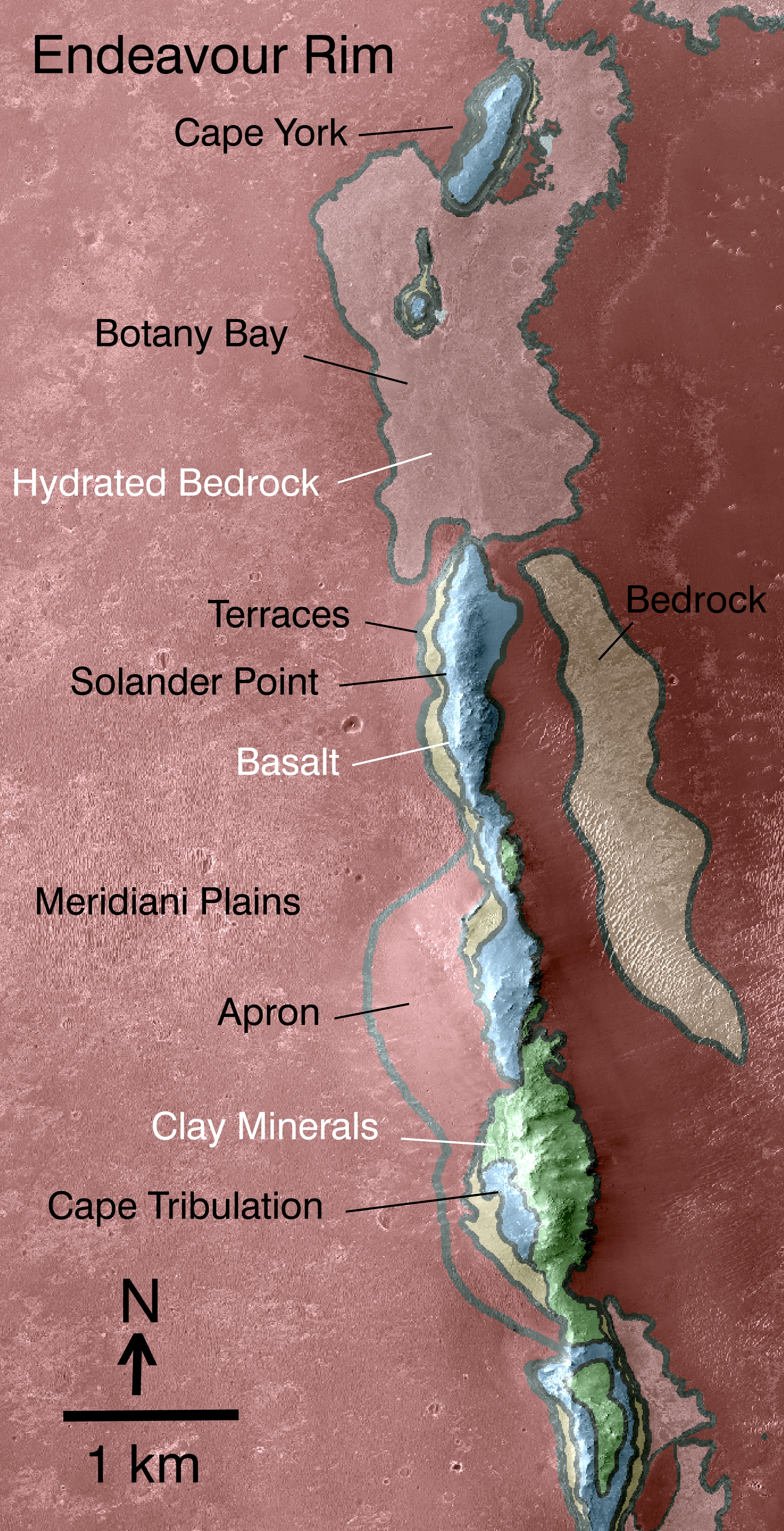
Solander Point is a location on the Western Rim of Endeavour crater, shown here in this geological map produced with data from MRO's CRISM instrument

== Rover views of Solander ==
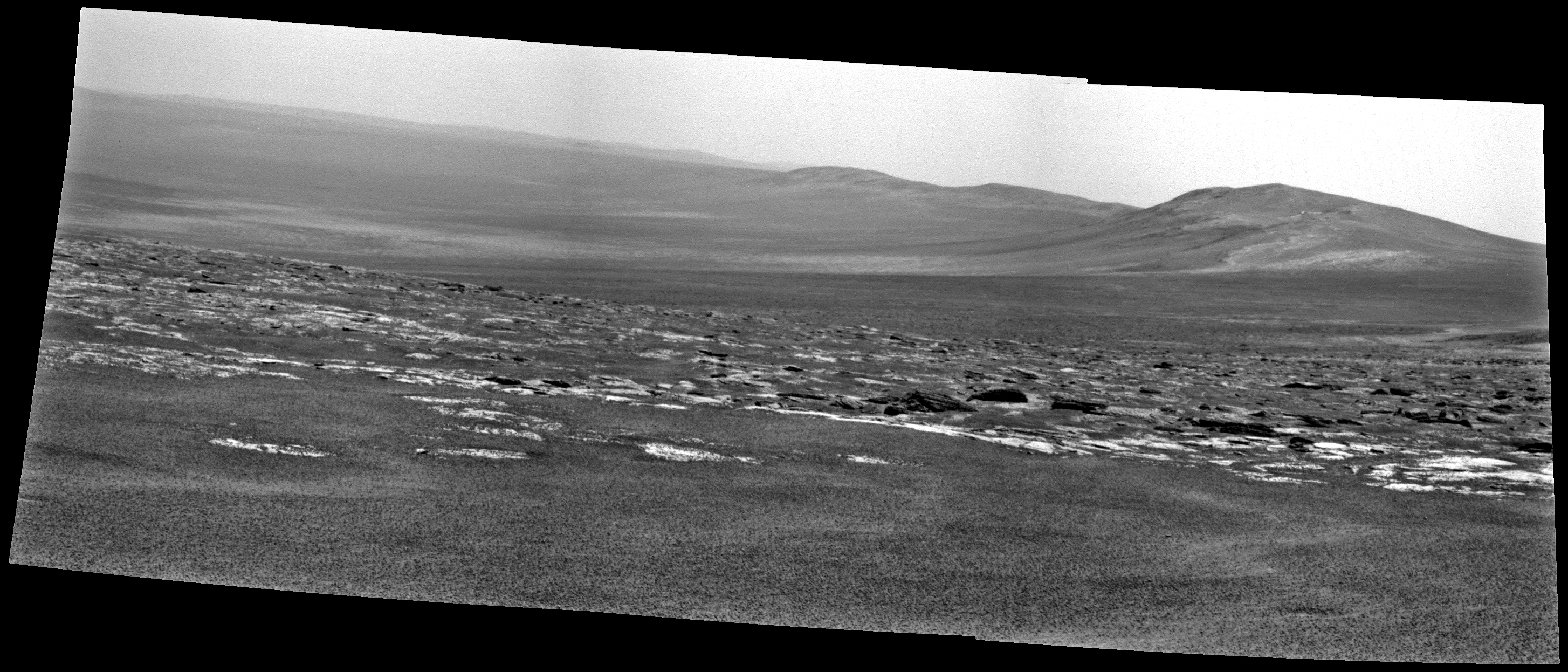
Looking south along the Western rim of Endeavour crater, Solander Point is the start of the ridge on the right

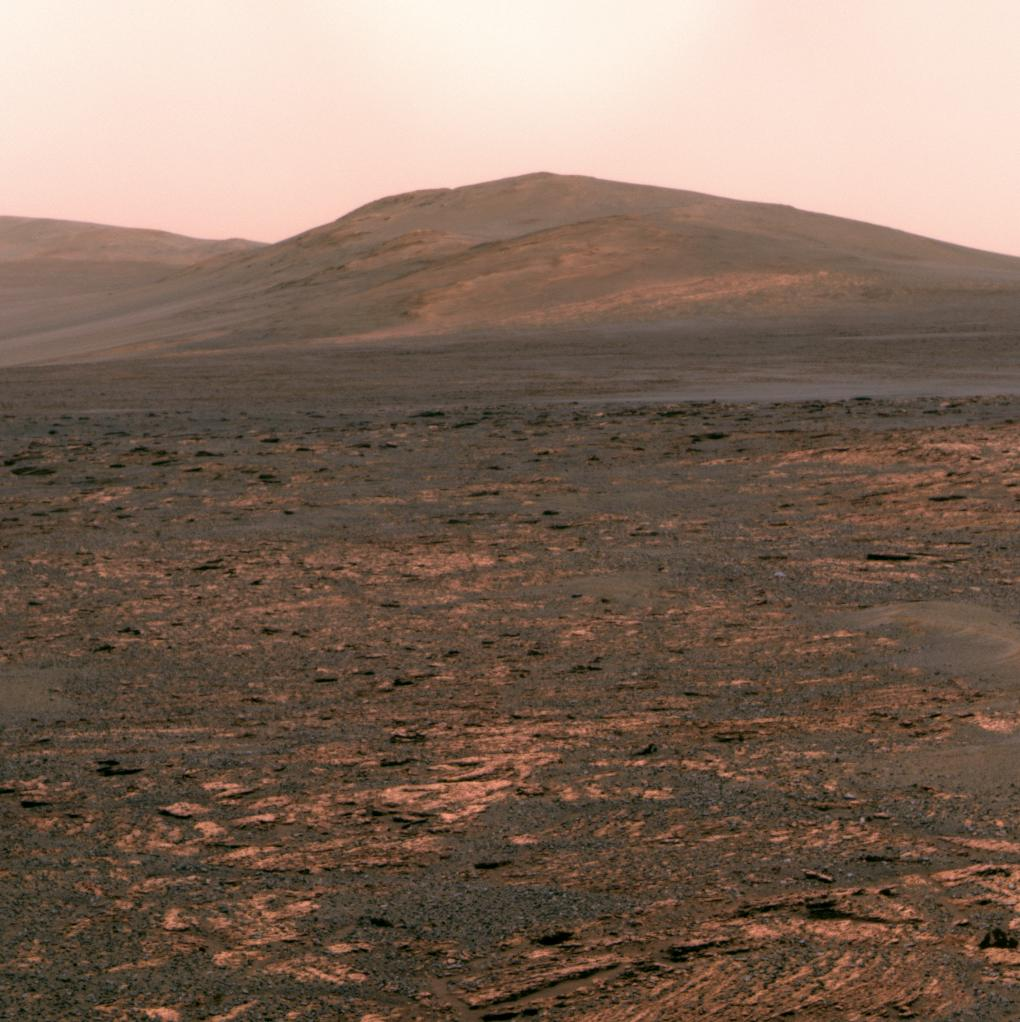
Solander Point from the north
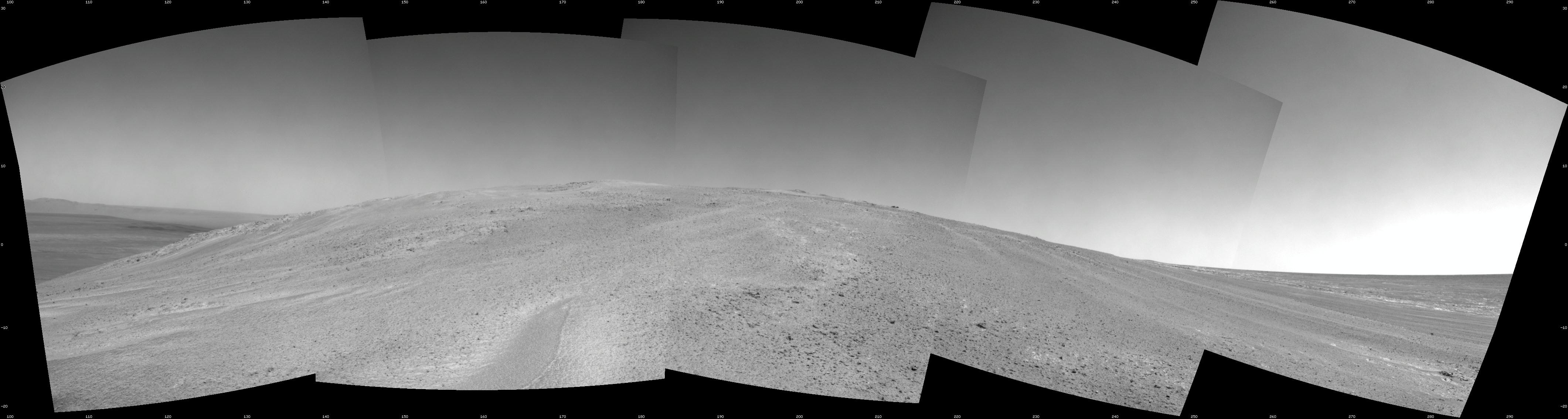
This is a southward uphill view as the rover ascended the mountain in October 2013. It is assembled from NavCam images.

== See also ==
- Cape York (Mars)
- Endeavour crater
- Opportunity mission timeline
