= List of rocks on Mars =

Martian rocks and outcrops have been studied in-situ by various landers and rovers. While many of the rocks identified on the Martian surface are similar to each other, some have been considered scientifically important or otherwise notable and have been subjected to more extensive study or public interest.

Names for Mars rocks are largely unofficial designations used for ease of discussion purposes, as the International Astronomical Union's official Martian naming system declares that objects smaller than 100 m (330 ft) are not to be given official names. Because of this, some less significant rocks seen in photos returned by Mars rovers have been named more than once, and others have even had their names changed later due to conflicts or even matters of opinion among researchers. Often rocks are named after the children or family members of astronauts or NASA employees.

The rocks at the landing site of the Sojourner rover were given names of cartoon characters. Among them were Pop Tart, Ender, mini-Matterhorn, Wedge, Baker's Bench, Scooby Doo, Yogi, Barnacle Bill, Pooh Bear, Piglet, the Lamb, the Shark, Ginger, Souffle, Casper, Moe, and Stimpy. A dune was called Mermaid Dune, and a pair of hills were named Twin Peaks.

Sojourner rover (Mars Pathfinder 1997):

- Barnacle Bill
- Yogi

Spirit rover (Mars Exploration Rover, 2004–2010):

- Adirondack
- Home Plate
- Pot of Gold

Opportunity rover (Mars Exploration Rover, 2004–2018):

- Block Island
- Bounce
- El Capitan
- Heat Shield
- Last Chance
- Mackinac Island
- Oileán Ruaidh

Curiosity rover (Mars Science Laboratory, 2012–present):

- Bathurst Inlet
- Goulburn
- Hottah
- Jake Matijevic
- Link
- Rocknest
- Rocknest 3
- Tintina
- N165 ("Coronation" rock)

Perseverance rover (Mars 2020, 2020–present):

- Cheyava Falls

== See also ==
- Composition of Mars
- Geology of Mars
- List of craters on Mars
- List of individual rocks
- List of mountains on Mars
- List of rock formations
- List of valles on Mars
- Martian regolith
- Mineralogy of Mars
