= Bounce Rock =

Pyroxene rock found on Mars

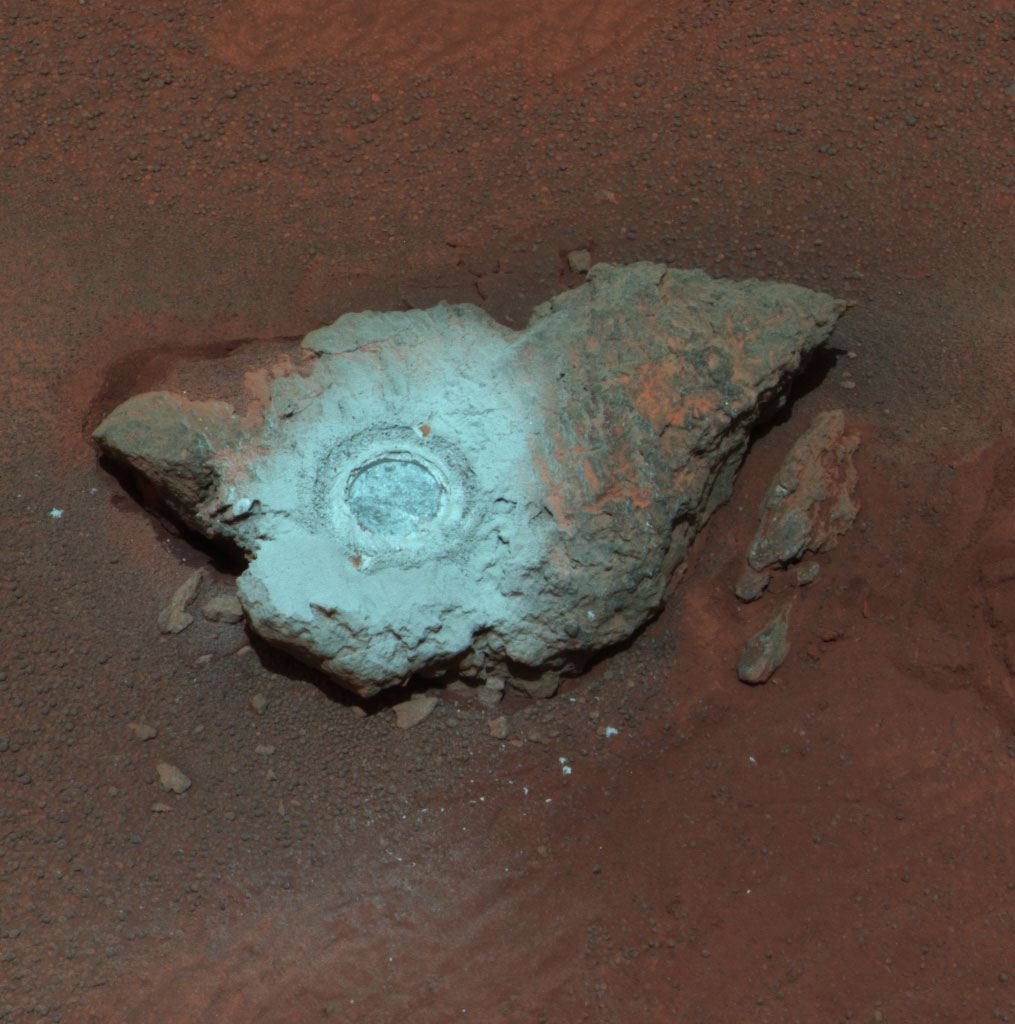
- False-color composite of Bounce Rock after being drilled by the rock abrasion tool of the Mars Exploration Rover Opportunity
- Feature type: Rock
- Coordinates: 1.9°S 354.5°E

Bounce Rock is a football-sized primarily pyroxene rock found within the Meridiani Planum of the planet Mars. It was discovered and observed by the Mars Exploration Rover Opportunity in April 2004. The rock was named for it having been struck by Opportunity as the craft bounced to a stop during its landing stage.

Bounce Rock bears a striking resemblance to a class of meteorites found on Earth known as shergottites, that are believed to have originated from Mars.

Bopolu (crater) was identified as a possible source of Bounce Rock.

== See also ==
- List of rocks on Mars – Alphabetical list of named rocks and meteorites found on Mars
- List of surface features of Mars imaged by Opportunity – Features recorded by 2004–2018 missions
