= Meteorite weathering =

Terrestrial alteration of a meteorite

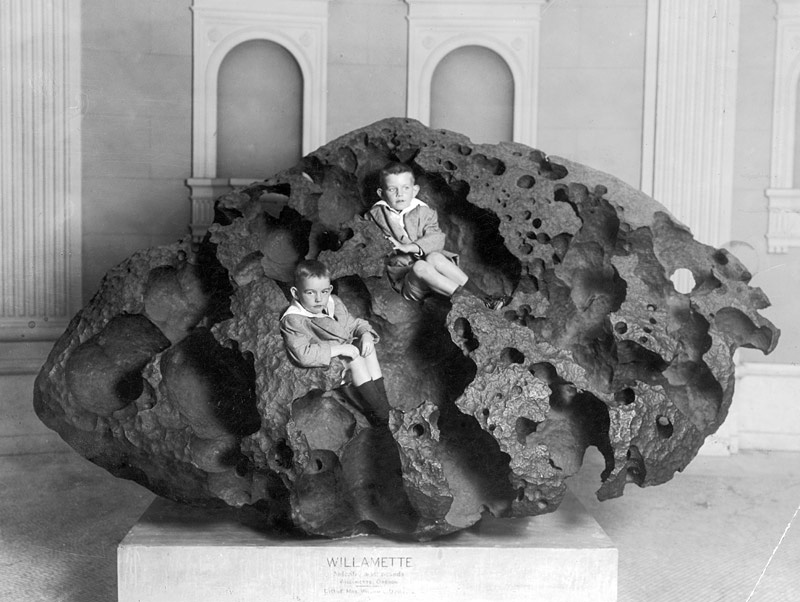
Two children are sitting within the corrosion grooves of the Willamette meteorite. Considerable mass has been lost to terrestrial weathering.

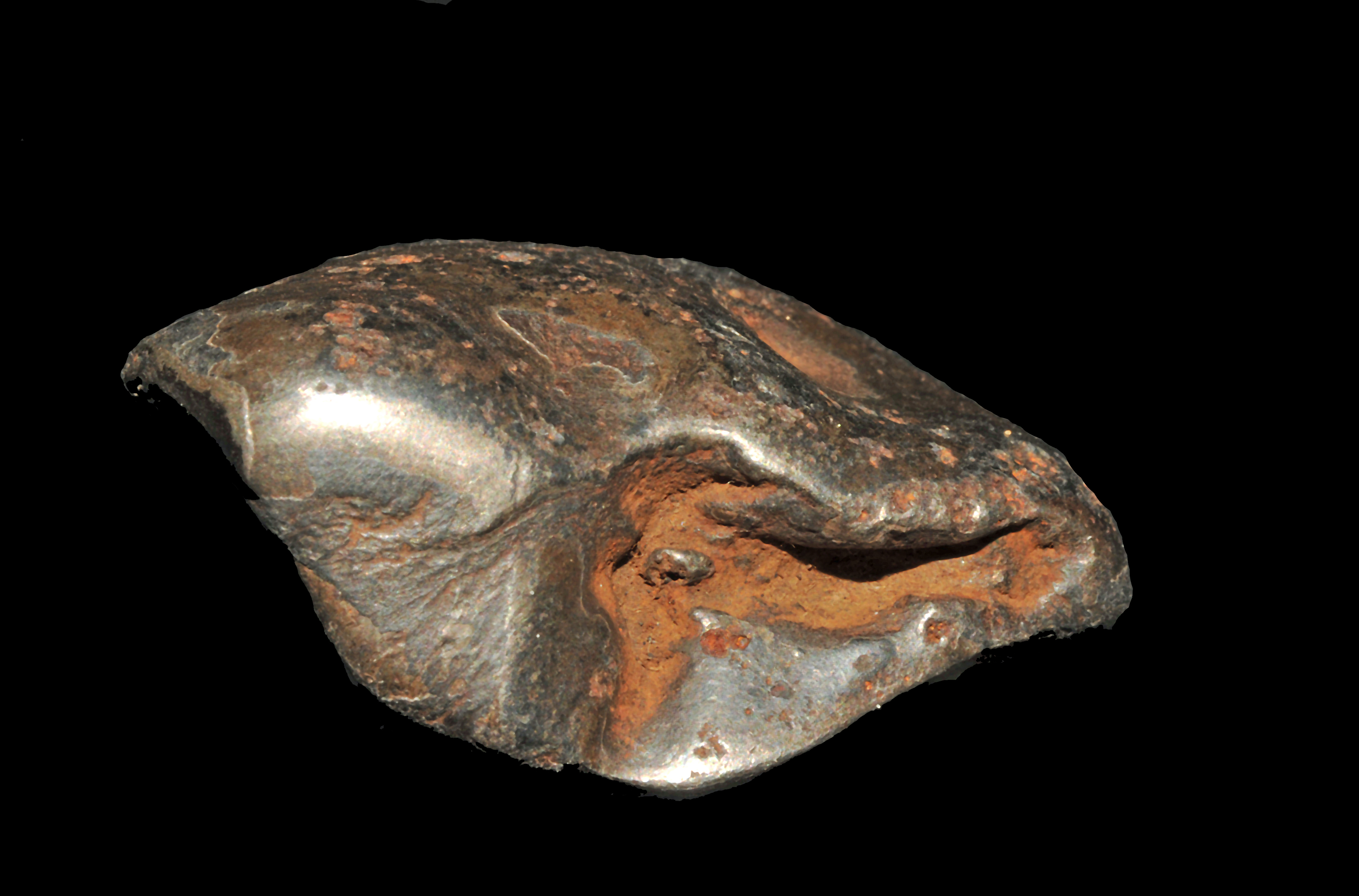
A Sikhote-Alin meteorite with visible rust.

Meteorite weathering is the terrestrial alteration of a meteorite. Most meteorites date from the oldest times in the Solar System and are by far the oldest material available on Earth. Despite their age, they are vulnerable to the terrestrial environment. Water, chlorine and oxygen attack meteorites as soon as they reach the ground.

== Weathering scales ==
In order to quantify the degree of alteration that a meteorite experienced, several qualitative weathering indices have been applied to antarctic and desert samples.

The most known weathering scale is based upon the effects seen in polished thin sections of chondritic meteorites and it ranges from W0 (pristine) to W6 (heavy alteration). It was proposed by Jull A. J. T. et al. (1991) and updated by Wlotzka(1993) and Al-Kathiri et al.(2005).

- W0: no visible oxidation of metal or troilite, but may be noticeable in transmitted light a limonitic staining. Usually recently fallen meteorites are of this grade, although some are already W1.
- W1: small oxide rims around metal and troilite, small oxide veins.
- W2: moderate oxidation of metal (about 20-60% replaced).
- W3: heavy oxidation of metal and troilite (60-95% replaced).
- W4: complete oxidation of metal and troilite (>95% replaced), but no alteration of silicates.
- W5: beginning alteration of mafic silicates, mainly along cracks.
- W6: heavy replacement of silicates by clay minerals and oxides.

The Meteorite Working Group at the Johnson Space Center uses weathering categories A B, C and E to denote the alteration of antarctic meteorites. Their official definitions are:

- A: Minor rustiness; rust haloes on metal particles and rust stains along fractures are minor.
- B: Moderate rustiness; large rust haloes occur on metal particles and rust stains on internal fractures are extensive.
- C: Severe rustiness; metal particles have been mostly stained by rust throughout.
- E: Evaporite minerals visible to the naked eye.

== See also ==
- Glossary of meteoritics
- Meteorite classification
- Weathering
