= Opportunity (rover) =

NASA Mars rover deployed in 2004

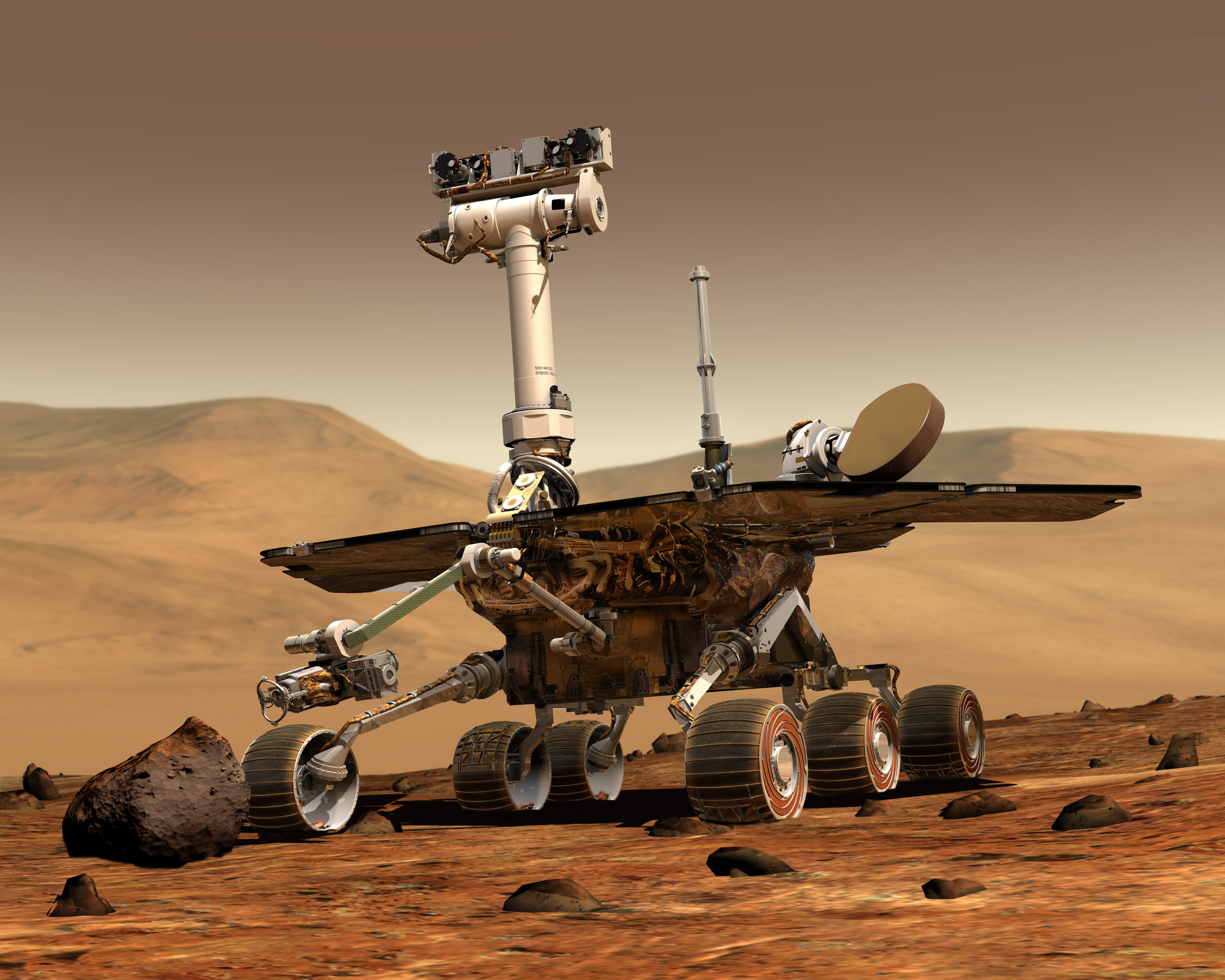
- An artist's portrayal of Opportunity operating on the surface of Mars
- Mission type: Mars rover
- Operator: NASA
- COSPAR ID: 2003-032A
- SATCAT no.: 27849
- Website: Mars Exploration Rover
- Mission duration: Planned: 90 sols (92.5 days); Actual: 5,352 sols (5,498 days); (8 Mars years, 15 Earth years)

Spacecraft properties
- Dry mass: 185 kilograms (408 lb)
- Power: Solar panels: 140 W

Start of mission
- Launch date: July 8, 2003, 03:18 UTC
- Rocket: Delta II Heavy
- Launch site: Cape Canaveral SLC-17B
- Contractor: Boeing

End of mission
- Declared: February 13, 2019
- Last contact: June 10, 2018

Mars rover
- Landing date: January 25, 2004, 05:05 UTC SCET; MSD 46236 14:35 AMT
- Landing site: Eagle, Meridiani Planum; 1.9462°S 354.4734°E
- Distance driven: 45.16 km (28.06 mi)
- Opportunity mission patch, featuring Duck Dodgers (Daffy Duck) Mars Exploration Program NASA Mars rovers

Opportunity, also known as MER-B (Mars Exploration Rover – B) or MER-1, and nicknamed Oppy, is a robotic rover that was active on Mars from 2004 until 2018. Opportunity was operational on Mars for 5111 sols (14 years, 138 days on Earth). Launched on July 7, 2003, as part of NASA's Mars Exploration Rover program, it landed in Meridiani Planum on January 25, 2004, three weeks after its twin, Spirit (MER-A), touched down on the other side of the planet. With a planned 90-sol duration of activity (slightly less than 92.5 Earth days), Spirit functioned until it got stuck in 2009 and ceased communications in 2010, while Opportunity was able to stay operational for 5111 sols after landing, maintaining its power and key systems through continual recharging of its batteries using solar power, and hibernating during events such as dust storms to save power. This careful operation allowed Opportunity to operate for 57 times its designed lifespan, exceeding the initial plan by 14 years, 47 days (in Earth time). By June 10, 2018, when it last contacted NASA, the rover had traveled a distance of 45.16 kilometers (28.06 miles).

Mission highlights included the initial 90-sol mission, finding meteorites such as Heat Shield Rock (Meridiani Planum meteorite), and over two years of exploring and studying Victoria crater. The rover survived moderate dust storms and in 2011 reached Endeavour crater, which has been considered as a "second landing site". The Opportunity mission is considered one of NASA's most successful ventures.

Due to the planetary 2018 dust storm on Mars, Opportunity ceased communications on June 10 and entered hibernation on June 12, 2018. It was hoped it would reboot once the weather cleared, but it did not, suggesting either a catastrophic failure or that a layer of dust had covered its solar panels. NASA hoped to re-establish contact with the rover, citing a recurring windy period which was forecast for November 2018 to January 2019, that could potentially clean off its solar panels. On February 13, 2019, NASA officials declared that the Opportunity mission was complete, after the spacecraft had failed to respond to over 1,000 signals sent since August 2018.

== Objectives ==
The scientific objectives of the Mars Exploration Rover mission were to:

- Search for and characterize a variety of rocks and soils that hold clues to past water activity. In particular, samples sought include those that have minerals deposited by water-related processes such as precipitation, evaporation, sedimentary cementation, or hydrothermal activity.
- Determine the distribution and composition of minerals, rocks, and soils surrounding the landing sites.
- Determine what geologic processes have shaped the local terrain and influenced the chemistry. Such processes could include water or wind erosion, sedimentation, hydrothermal mechanisms, volcanism, and cratering.
- Perform calibration and validation of surface observations made by Mars Reconnaissance Orbiter (MRO) instruments. This will help determine the accuracy and effectiveness of various instruments that survey Martian geology from orbit.
- Search for iron-containing minerals, and to identify and quantify relative amounts of specific mineral types that contain water or were formed in water, such as iron-bearing carbonates.
- Characterize the mineralogy and textures of rocks and soils to determine the processes that created them.
- Search for geological clues to the environmental conditions that existed when liquid water was present.
- Assess whether those environments were conducive to life.

== Mission timeline ==
Animation of Opportunity trajectory from July 9, 2003, to January 25, 2004 Sun · Earth · Mars · Opportunity

Opportunity and Spirit rovers were part of the Mars Exploration Rover program in the long-term Mars Exploration Program. The Mars Exploration Program's four principal goals were to determine if the potential for life exists on Mars (in particular, whether recoverable water may be found on Mars), to characterize the Mars climate and its geology, and then to prepare for a potential human mission to Mars. The Mars Exploration Rovers were to travel across the Martian surface and perform periodic geologic analyses to determine if water ever existed on Mars as well as the types of minerals available, as well as to corroborate data taken by the Mars Reconnaissance Orbiter (MRO). Both rovers were designed with an expected 90 sols (92 Earth days) lifetime, but each lasted much longer than expected. Spirit's mission lasted 20 times longer than its expected lifetime, and its mission was declared ended on May 25, 2011, after it got stuck in soft sand and expended its power reserves trying to free itself. Opportunity lasted 55 times longer than its 90 sol planned lifetime, operating for 5498 days from landing to mission end. An archive of weekly updates on the rover's status can be found at the Opportunity Update Archive.

=== Launch and landing ===
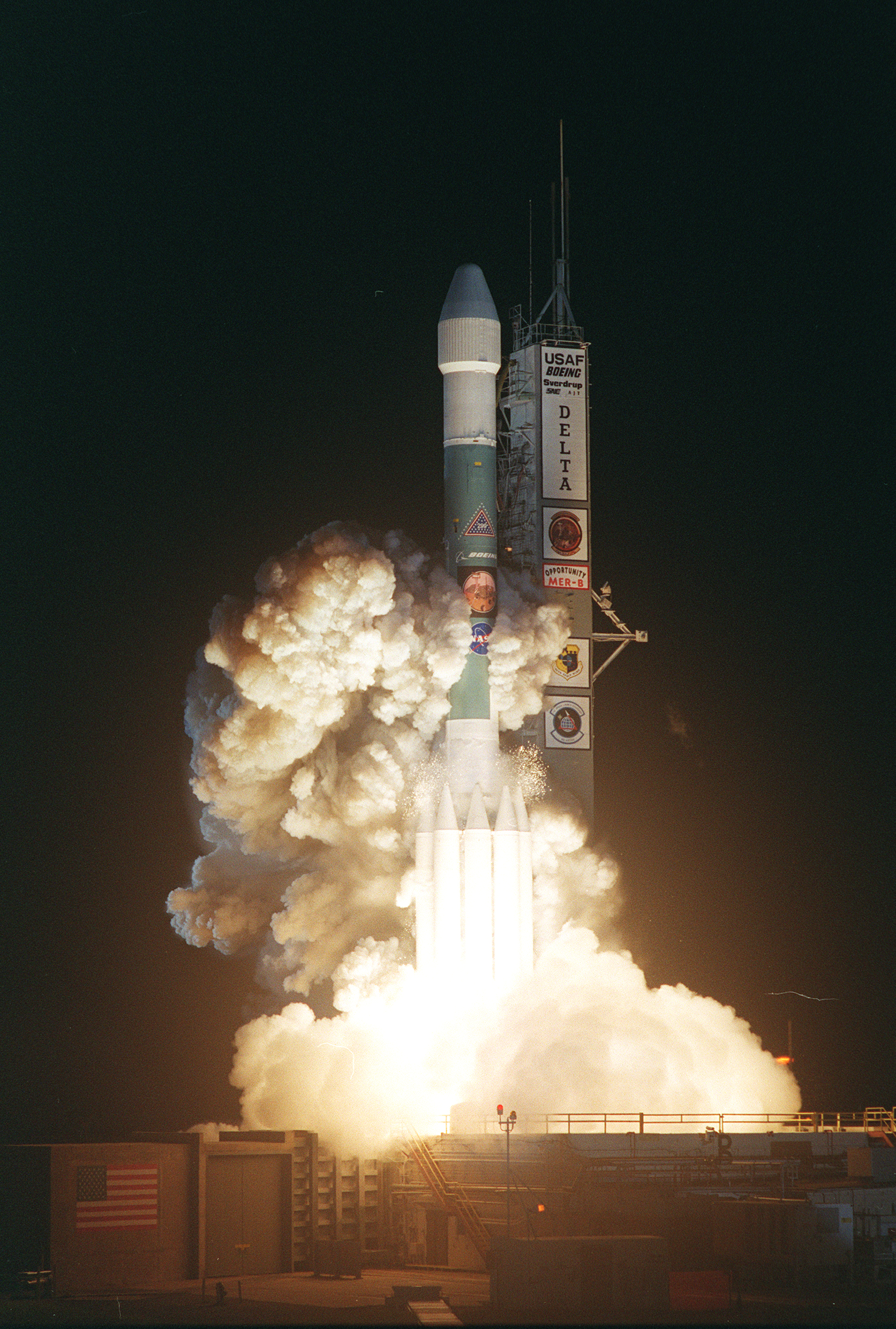
Delta II Heavy (7925H-9.5) lifting off from pad 17-B carrying MER-B in 2003 with Opportunity rover

Spirit and Opportunity were launched a month apart, on June 10 and July 8, 2003, and both reached the Martian surface by January 2004. Opportunity's launch was managed by NASA's Launch Services Program. This was the first launch of the Delta II Heavy. The launch period went from June 25 to July 15, 2003. The first launch attempt occurred on June 28, 2003, but the spacecraft launched nine days later on July 7, 2003, due to delays for range safety and winds, then later to replace items on the rocket (insulation and a battery). Each day had two instantaneous launch opportunities. On the day of launch, the launch was delayed to the second opportunity (11:18 p.m. EDT) in order to fix a valve.

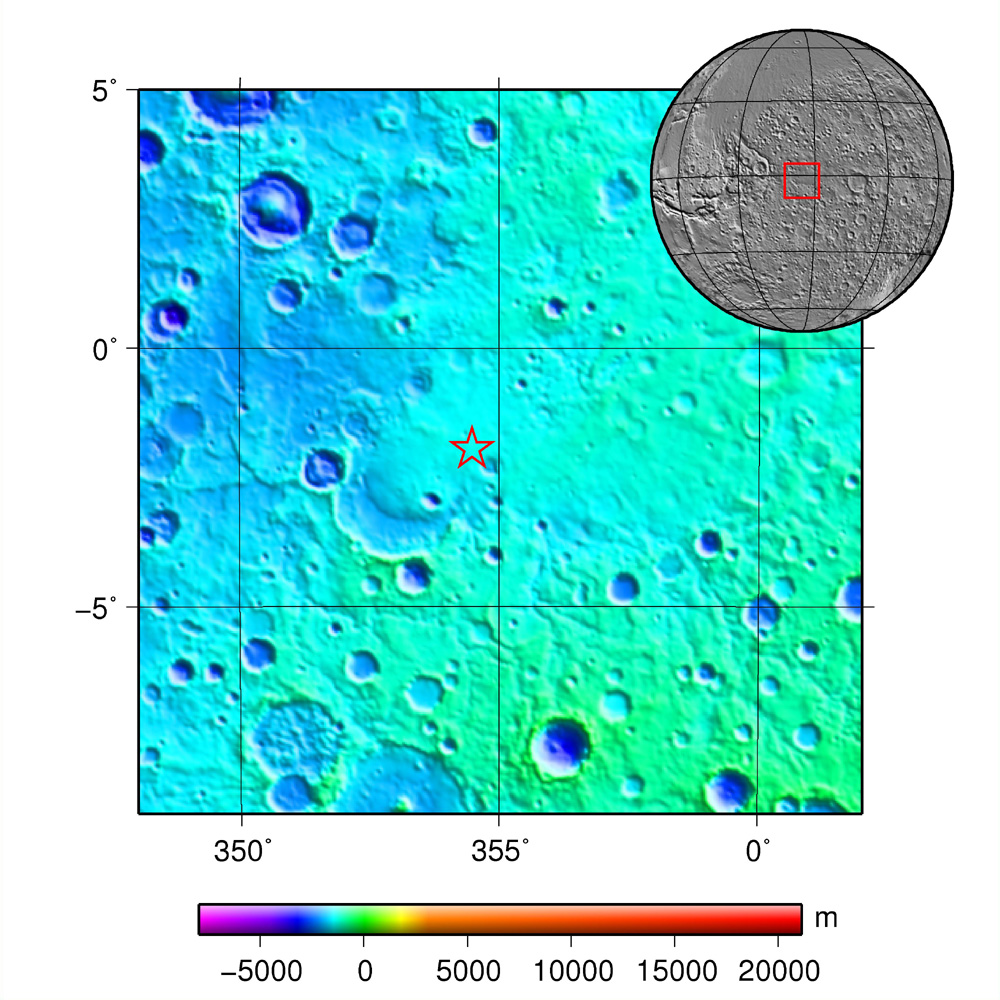
Opportunity's landing site (denoted with a star)

On January 25, 2004 (GMT) (January 24, 2004, PST), the airbag-protected landing craft settled onto the surface of Mars in the Eagle crater.

From its initial landing into an impact crater amidst an otherwise generally flat plain, Opportunity successfully investigated regolith and rock samples and took panoramic photos of its landing site. Its sampling allowed NASA scientists to make hypotheses concerning the presence of hematite and past presence of water on the surface of Mars. Following this, it was directed to travel across the surface of Mars to investigate another crater site, Endurance crater, which it explored from June to December 2004. Subsequently, Opportunity examined the impact site of its own heat shield and discovered an intact meteorite, now known as Heat Shield Rock, on the surface of Mars.

Opportunity was directed to proceed in a southerly direction to Erebus crater, a large, shallow, partially buried crater and a stopover on the way south towards Victoria crater, between October 2005 and March 2006. It experienced some mechanical problems with its robotic arm.

In late September 2006, Opportunity reached Victoria crater and explored along the rim in a clockwise direction. In June 2007 it returned to Duck Bay, its original arrival point at Victoria crater; in September 2007 it entered the crater to begin a detailed study. In August 2008, Opportunity left Victoria crater for Endeavour crater, which it reached on August 9, 2011.

At the rim of the Endeavour crater, the rover moved around a geographic feature named Cape York. The Mars Reconnaissance Orbiter had detected phyllosilicates there, and the rover analyzed the rocks with its instruments to check this sighting on the ground. This structure was analyzed in depth until summer 2013. In May 2013 the rover was heading south to a hill named Solander Point.

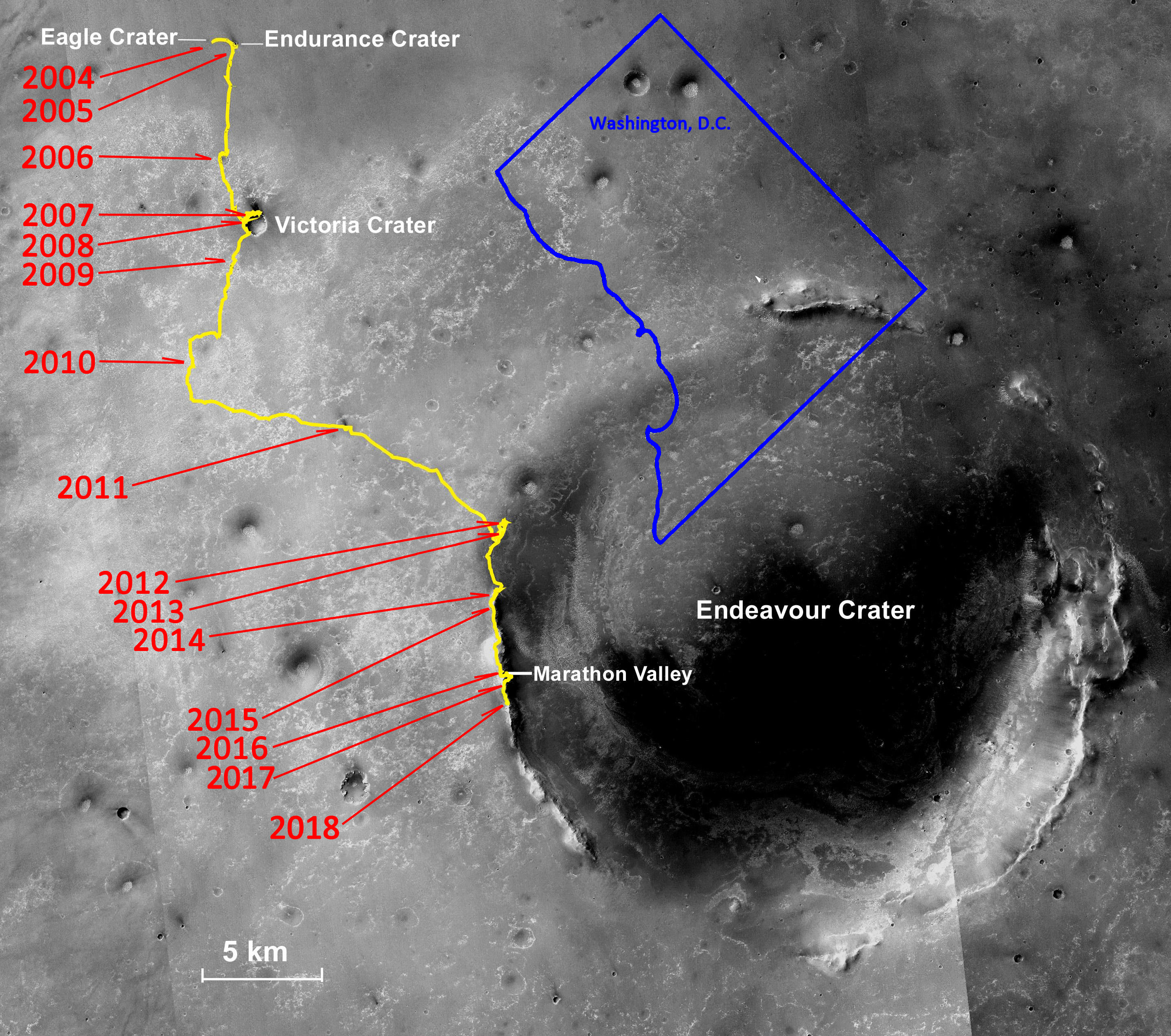
Lifetime progress map with Washington, D.C. overlay for size and distance comparison

Opportunity's total odometry by June 10, 2018 (sol 5111), was 45.16 km (28.06 mi), while the solar array dust factor (one of the determinants of solar power production) was 10.8, exponentially higher than any previous reading during the mission; for comparison, readings over the previous five and a half years dating back to January 2013, had varied from a relatively dusty 0.467 on December 5, 2013 (sol 3507), to a relatively clean 0.964 on May 13, 2014 (sol 3662).

In December 2014, NASA reported that Opportunity was suffering from "amnesia" events in which the rover failed to write data, e.g. telemetry information, to non-volatile memory. The hardware failure was believed to be due to an age-related fault in one of the rover's seven memory banks. As a result, NASA had aimed to force the rover's software to ignore the failed memory bank; amnesia events continued to occur, however, which eventually resulted in vehicle resets. In light of this, on Sol 4027 (May 23, 2015), the rover was configured to operate in RAM-only mode, completely avoiding the use of non-volatile memory for storage.

=== End of mission ===
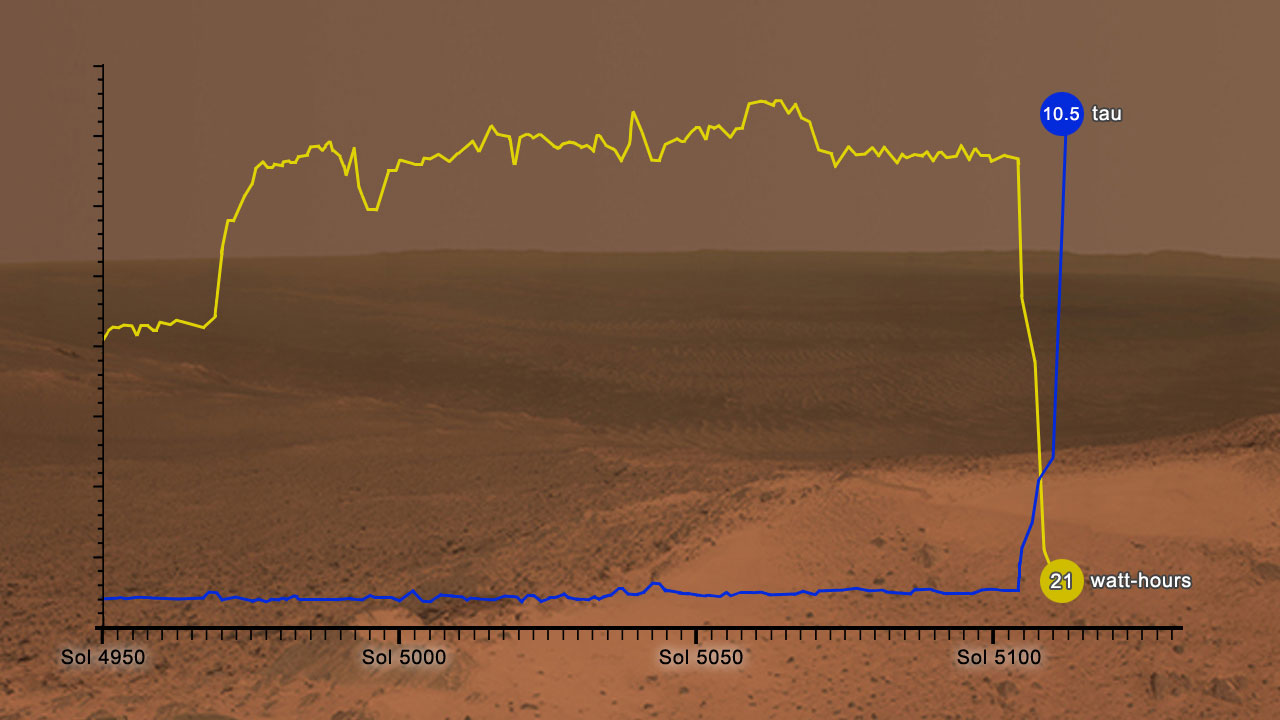
Graph of atmospheric opacity and Opportunity's energy reserve

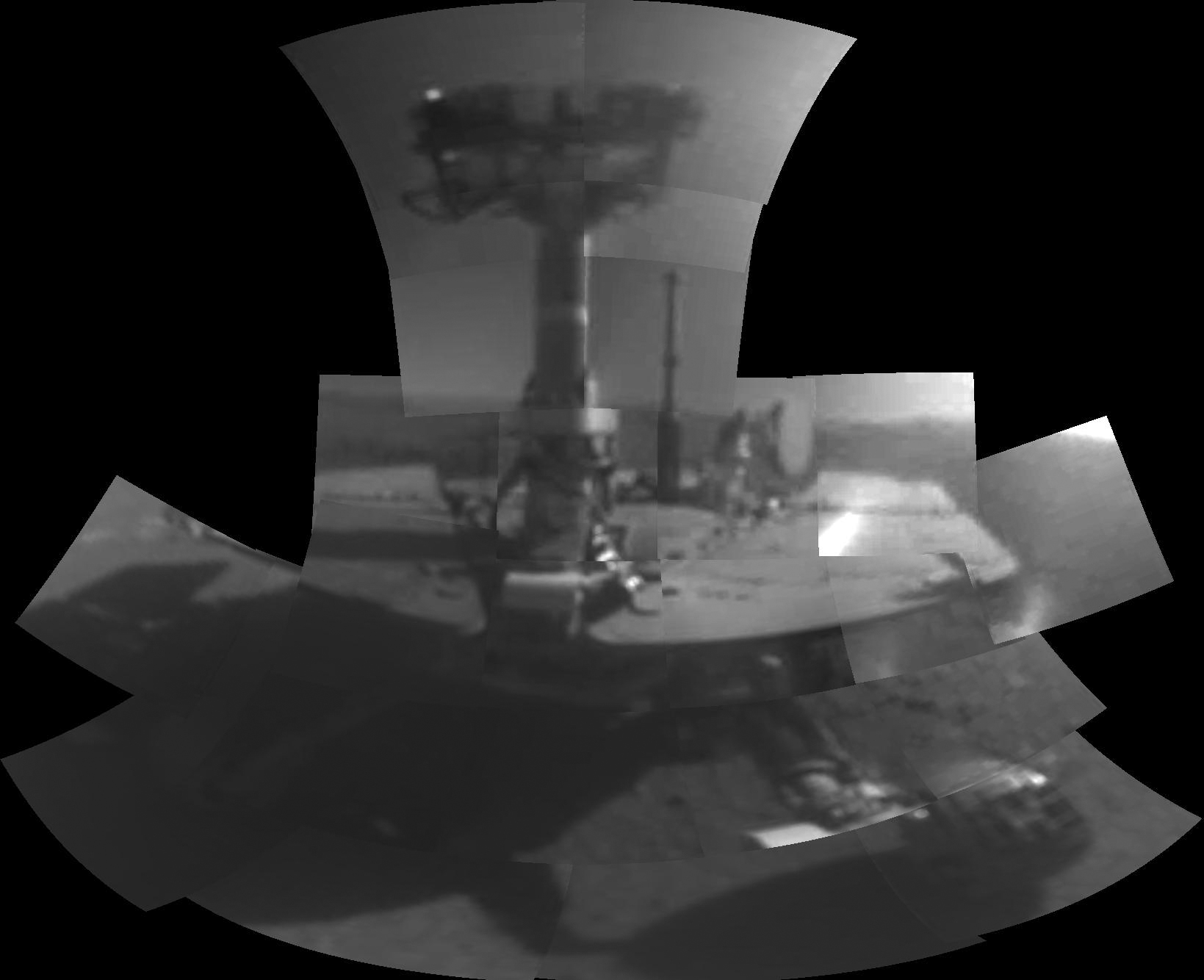
Opportunity's first self-portrait on Mars (February 14–20, 2018 / sols 4998−5004)

In early June 2018, a large planetary-scale dust storm developed, and within a few days the rover's solar panels were not generating enough power to maintain communications, with the last contact on June 10, 2018. NASA stated that they did not expect to resume communication until after the storm subsided, but the rover kept silent even after the storm ended in early October, suggesting either a catastrophic failure or a layer of dust covering its solar panels. The team remained hopeful that a windy period between November 2018 and January 2019 might clear the dust from its solar panels, as had happened before. Wind was detected nearby on January 8, and on January 26 the mission team announced a plan to begin broadcasting a new set of commands to the rover in case its radio receiver failed.

On February 12, 2019, past and present members of the mission team gathered in the Jet Propulsion Laboratory (JPL)'s Space Flight Operations Facility to watch final commands being transmitted to Opportunity via the 70-meter (230-foot) dish of the Goldstone Deep Space Communications Complex in California. Following 25 minutes of transmission of the final 4 sets of commands, communication attempts with the rover were handed off to Canberra, Australia.

After the loss of signal in June 2018 more than 835 recovery commands were transmitted by January 2019, and more than 1,000 by February 13, 2019. NASA officials held a press conference on February 13 to declare an official end to the mission. NASA associate administrator Thomas Zurbuchen said, "It is therefore that I am standing here with a deep sense of appreciation and gratitude that I declare the Opportunity mission is complete." As NASA ended their attempts to contact the rover, the last data sent was the song "I'll Be Seeing You" performed by Billie Holiday. Assets that had been needed to support Opportunity were transitioned to support the Curiosity rover and the then-upcoming Perseverance rover.

The final communication from the rover came on June 10, 2018 (sol 5111) from Perseverance Valley, and indicated a solar array energy production of 22 Watt-hours for the sol, and the highest atmospheric opacity (tau) ever measured on Mars: 10.8.

== Design and construction ==
Annotated rover diagram

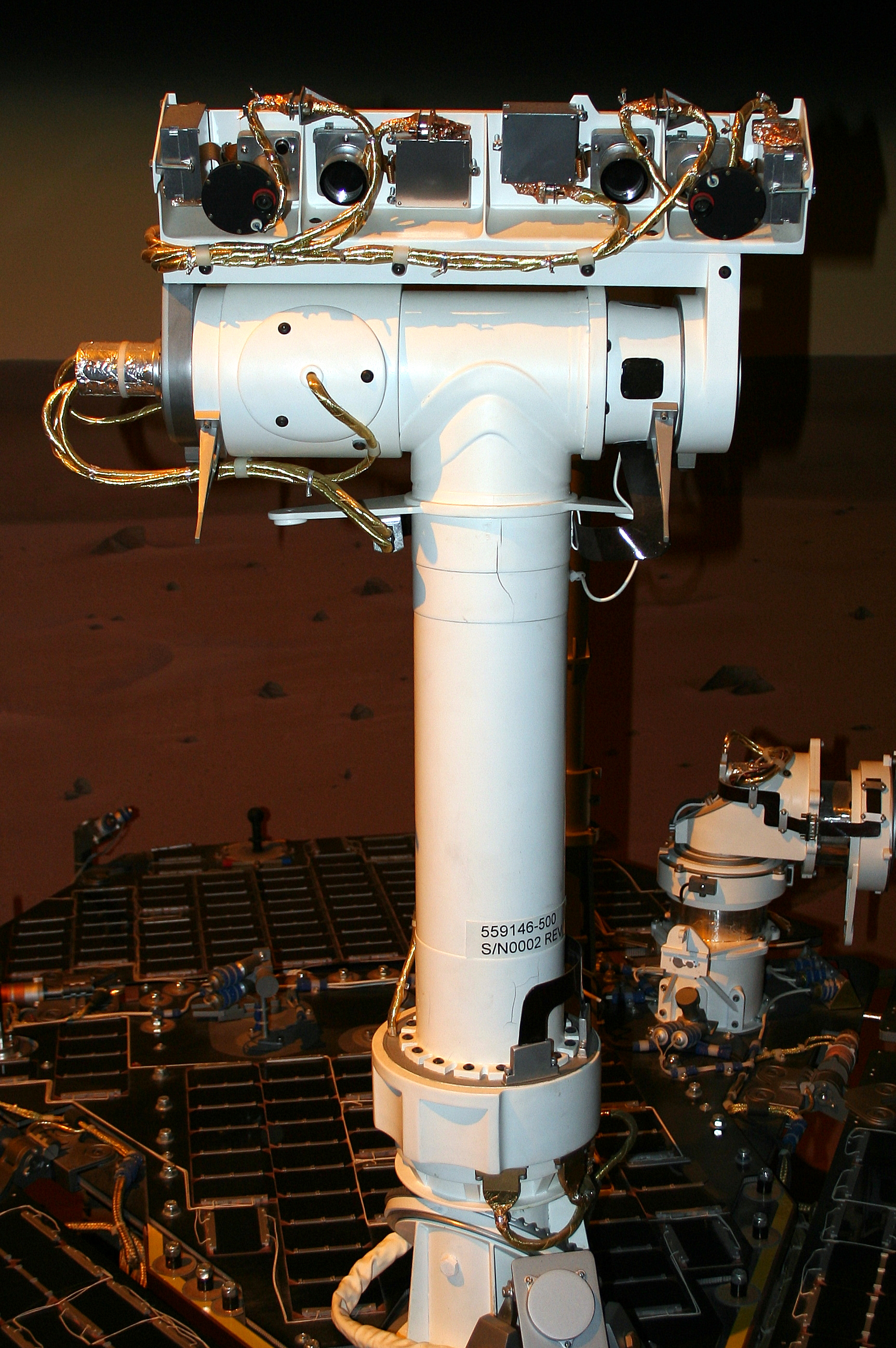
Pancam Mast Assembly (PMA)

Opportunity (and its twin, Spirit) are six-wheeled, solar-powered robots standing 1.5 meters (4.9 ft) high, 2.3 meters (7.5 ft) wide and 1.6 meters (5.2 ft) long and weighing 180 kilograms (400 lb). Six wheels on a rocker-bogie system enabled mobility over rough terrain. Each wheel had its own motor. The vehicle was steered at front and rear and was designed to operate safely at tilts of up to 30 degrees. The maximum speed was 5 centimeters per second (2.0 in/s); 0.18 kilometers per hour (0.11 mph), although the average speed was about 1 centimeter per second (0.39 in/s). Both Spirit and Opportunity have pieces of the fallen World Trade Center's metal on them that were "turned into shields to protect cables on the drilling mechanisms".

Solar arrays generated about 140 watts for up to fourteen hours per sol, while rechargeable lithium ion batteries stored energy for use at night. Opportunity's onboard computer uses a 20 MHz RAD6000 CPU with 128 MB of DRAM and 3 MB of EEPROM. The rover's operating temperature ranges from −40 to +40 °C (−40 to 104 °F) and radioisotope heaters provide a base level of heating, assisted by electrical heaters when necessary.

Communications depended on an omnidirectional low-gain antenna communicating at a low data rate and a steerable high-gain antenna, both in direct contact with the Deep Space Network on Earth. A low-gain antenna was also used to relay data to spacecraft orbiting Mars.

=== Science payload ===
The science instruments included:

- Panoramic Camera (Pancam) – examined the texture, color, mineralogy, and structure of the local terrain.
- Navigation Camera (Navcam) – monochrome with a higher field of view but lower resolution, for navigation and driving.
- Miniature Thermal Emission Spectrometer (Mini-TES) – identified promising rocks and soils for closer examination, and determined the processes that formed them.
- Hazcams, two B&W cameras with 120 degree field of view, that provided additional data about the rover's surroundings.

The rover arm held the following instruments:

- Mössbauer spectrometer (MB) MIMOS II – used for close-up investigations of the mineralogy of iron-bearing rocks and soils.
- Alpha particle X-ray spectrometer (APXS) – close-up analysis of the abundances of elements that make up rocks and soils.
- Magnets – for collecting magnetic dust particles.
- Microscopic Imager (MI) – obtained close-up, high-resolution images of rocks and soils.
- Rock Abrasion Tool (RAT) – exposed fresh material for examination by instruments on board.

Opportunity was 'driven' by several operators throughout its mission, including JPL roboticist Vandi Verma.

=== Power ===
The rover uses a combination of solar cells and a rechargeable chemical battery. This class of rover has two rechargeable lithium batteries, each composed of 8 cells with 8 amp-hour capacity. At the start of the mission the solar panels could provide up to around 900 watt-hours (Wh) per day to recharge the battery and power system in one Sol, but this could vary due to a variety of factors. In Eagle crater the cells were producing about 840 Wh per day, but by Sol 319 in December 2004, it had dropped to 730 Wh per day.

Like Earth, Mars has seasonal variations that reduce sunlight during winter. However, since the Martian year is longer than that of the Earth, the seasons fully rotate roughly once every 2 Earth years. By 2016, MER-B had endured seven Martian winters, during which times power levels drop which can mean the rover avoids doing activities that use a lot of power. During its first winter power levels dropped to under 300 Wh per day for two months, but some later winters were not as bad.

Another factor that can reduce received power is dust in the atmosphere, especially dust storms. Dust storms have occurred quite frequently when Mars is closest to the Sun. Global dust storms in 2007 reduced power levels for Opportunity and Spirit so much they could only run for a few minutes each day. Due to the 2018 dust storms on Mars, Opportunity entered hibernation mode on June 12, but it remained silent after the storm subsided in early October.

== Scientific findings ==
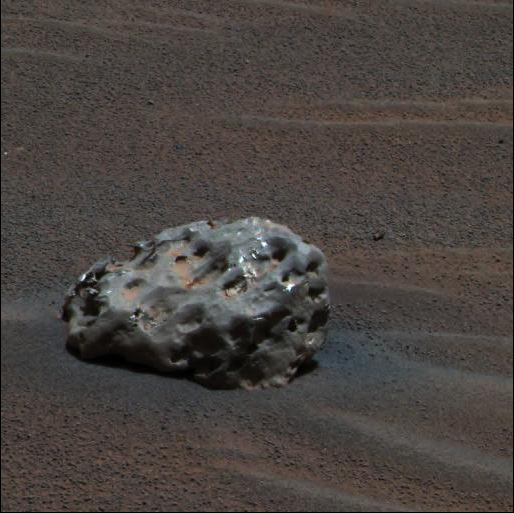
Heat Shield Rock turned out to be the first meteorite discovered on Mars.

Opportunity has provided substantial evidence in support of the mission's primary scientific goals: to search for and characterize a wide range of rocks and regolith that hold clues to past water activity on Mars. In addition to investigating the water, Opportunity has also obtained astronomical observations and atmospheric data.

== Legacy and honors ==
Following its launch, Opportunity was anthropomorphized by its operators: the rover was called a "she," drawing from nautical tradition, and given an affectionate nickname, "Oppy." One scientist, who worked with Opportunity for over a decade, attributed this to the rover's unexpectedly long lifespan, which he called a story of "an underdog beating the odds," and its "familiar, almost biologically inspired shape." The media attention surrounding Opportunity's shutdown spread this usage to the general public.

With word on February 12, 2019, that NASA was likely to conclude the Opportunity mission, many media outlets and commentators issued statements praising the mission's success and stating their goodbyes to the rover. One journalist, Jacob Margolis, tweeted his translation of the last data transmission sent by Opportunity on June 10, 2018, as "My battery is low and it's getting dark." The phrase struck a chord with the public, inspiring a period of mourning, artwork, and tributes to the memory of Opportunity.

When the quote became widely reported, some news reports mistakenly asserted that the rover sent that exact message in English, resulting in NASA being inundated with additional questions. Margolis wrote a clarifying article on February 16, making it clear he had taken statements from NASA officials who were interpreting the data sent by Opportunity, both on the state of its low power and Mars's high atmospheric opacity, and rephrased them in a poetic manner, never to imply the rover had sent the specific words.

Honoring Opportunity's great contribution to the exploration of Mars, an asteroid was named Opportunity: 39382 Opportunity. The name was proposed by Ingrid van Houten-Groeneveld who, along with Cornelis Johannes van Houten and Tom Gehrels, discovered the asteroid on September 24, 1960. Opportunity's lander is Challenger Memorial Station.

On March 24, 2015, NASA celebrated Opportunity having traveled the distance of a marathon race, 42.195 km (26.219 mi). The rover covered the distance in 11 years and 2 months. The JPL technicians celebrated the occasion by running a race. The location in Mars where the rover reached the distance was aptly named Marathon Valley.

A documentary film, Good Night Oppy, about the Opportunity, Spirit, and their long missions, was directed by Ryan White, and included support from JPL and Industrial Light & Magic. It was released in 2022.

== Images ==
The rover could take pictures with its different cameras, but only the PanCam camera had the ability to photograph a scene with different color filters. The panorama views are usually built up from PanCam images. By February 3, 2018, Opportunity had returned 224,642 pictures.

A selection of panoramas from the mission:

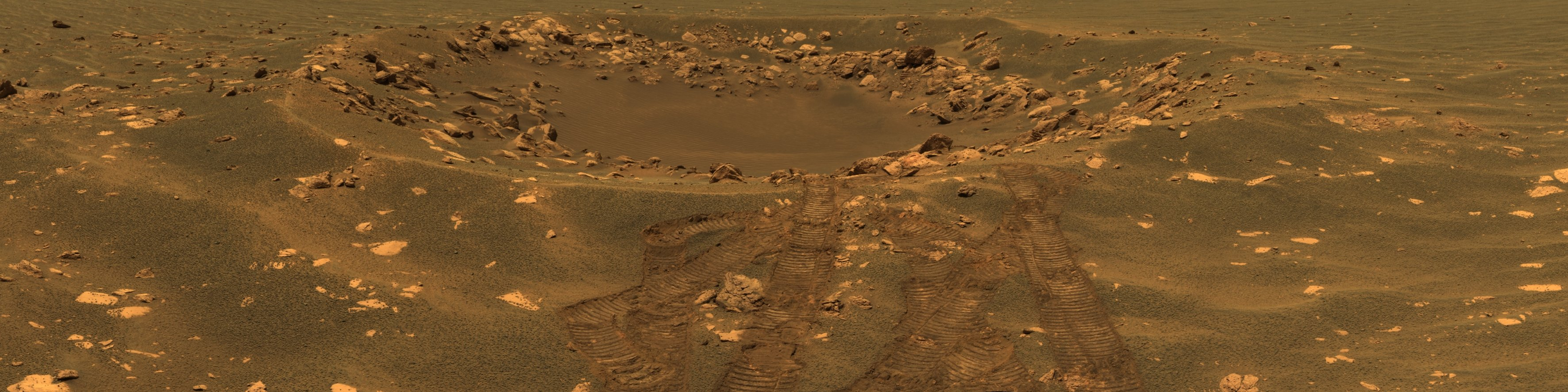
Panorama of Fram crater (Sol 88, April 23, 2004)
Final panorama image taken by Opportunity between May and June 2018 prior to being disabled by the dust storms
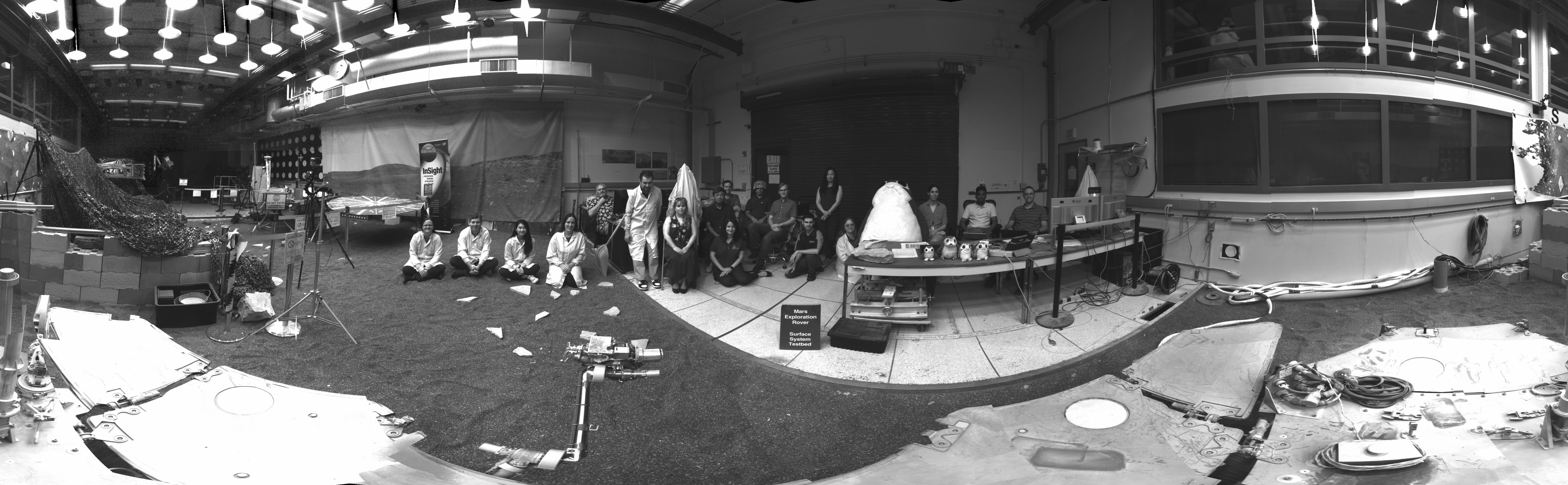
Panorama of the Opportunity rover team by "Dusty" – a testing replica of the rover on Earth (September 6, 2018)

== See also ==
- Curiosity rover – NASA rover exploring Mars since 2012
- Exploration of Mars
- List of missions to Mars
- List of rocks on Mars
- List of surface features of Mars visited by Spirit and Opportunity
- Mars 2020 – Astrobiology Mars rover mission by NASA
- Perseverance (rover)
- Rosalind Franklin rover – Planned Mars rover, part of ExoMars programme
- Mars Pathfinder – Mission including first robotic rover to operate on Mars (1997)
  - Sojourner – First NASA Mars rover on Mars Pathfinder mission
- Scientific information from the Mars Exploration Rover mission
- Comparison of embedded computer systems on board the Mars rovers
- Spirit rover – Former NASA Mars rover, active from 2004 to 2010
- Zhurong rover
