= Martian spherules =

Small iron oxide spherules found on Mars

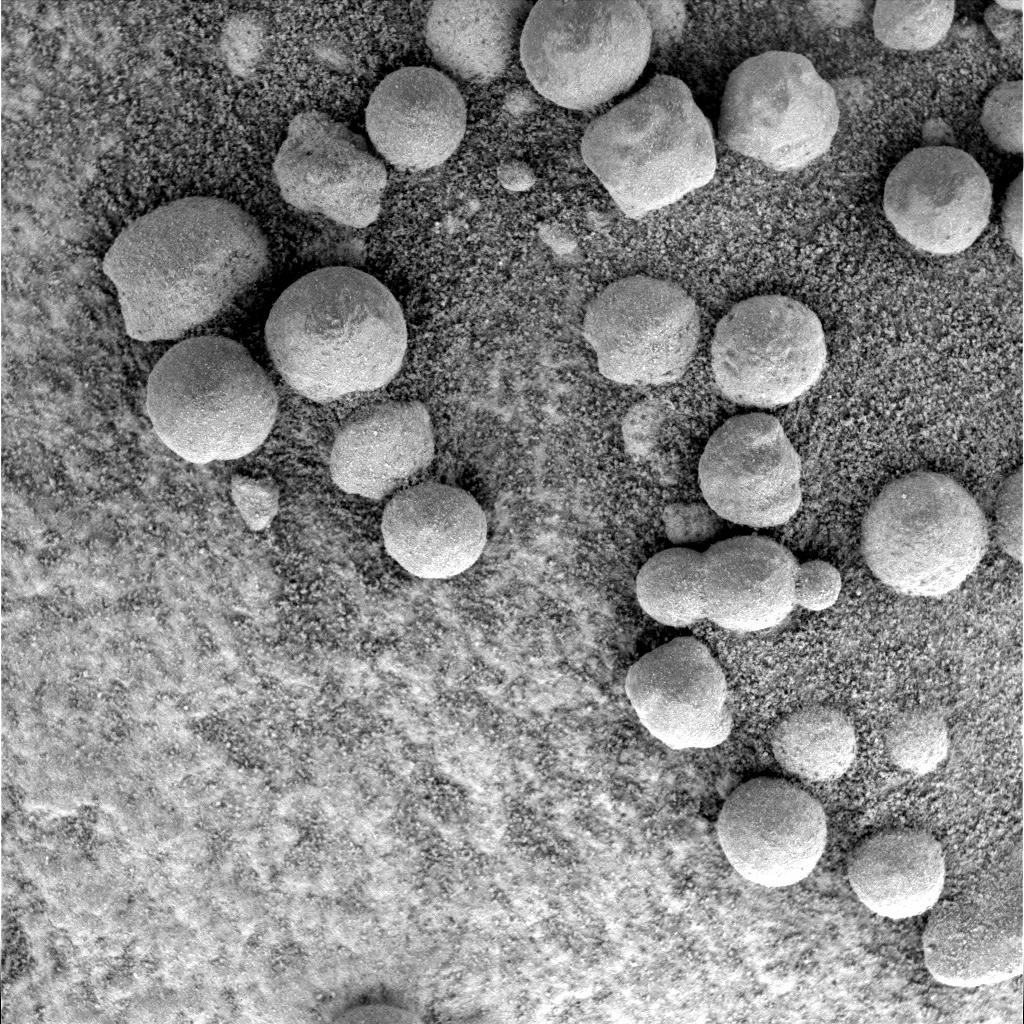
Loose hematite spherules at Eagle crater. Spherules are 3–6 mm in diameter.

Martian spherules (also known as hematite spherules or blueberries) are small spherules (roughly spherical pebbles) that are rich in an iron oxide (grey hematite, α-Fe_{2}O_{3}) and are found in exceedingly large numbers at Meridiani Planum, a vast Martian plain.

These spherules were discovered on the Martian day (sol) that NASA's Opportunity rover, part of the Mars Exploration Rover program, landed at Meridiani Planum. They are grey but look bluish next to the ubiquitous rusty reds on Mars, and since the first spherules found in Eagle crater were 3–6 mm in diameter, the Opportunity team quickly called them "blueberries".

Martian blueberries are either embedded or loose. That is, Martian blueberries are either embedded in the large body of sediments of Meridiani Planum, or they are loose blueberries that lie directly on outcrops of the sediments or lie on top soils spread over the Meridiani sediments. The size of these spherules varies by location and elevation across the Meridiani Planum.

Martian blueberries are rich in the iron oxide hematite, but determining how rich they are in this iron oxide has proven difficult. (more below). The formation of blueberries required aqueous chemistry and involved flows of acidic, salty, liquid water over the Meridiani Planum and over two geological epochs.

== Initial discovery ==
=== Discovery from orbit ===
From 14 September 1997 to 29 April 1998, the Mars Global Surveyor spacecraft collected spectral data with its Thermal Emission Spectrometer (TES) instrument as the spacecraft entered its science phase orbit. During this period, TES made its first detection of crystalline gray hematite (α-Fe_{2}O_{3}) within Sinus Meridiani, a low-albedo region. The hematite-rich surface was located in a region of sedimentary rock, with spectral data indicating that hematite formed micrometer-scale particles.

=== Maps of surface hematite ===
Between 1997 and 2002, the Mars Global Surveyor's TES mapped the whole planet of Mars for surface hematite levels. Figure 1a gives the TES's global hematite map in low resolution. It has just one large spot covering a region with high hematite levels. This green, yellow, and red spot straddles the equator and the prime meridian in the middle of Figure 1a. A higher resolution map of the high-hematite region is shown in Figure 1b.

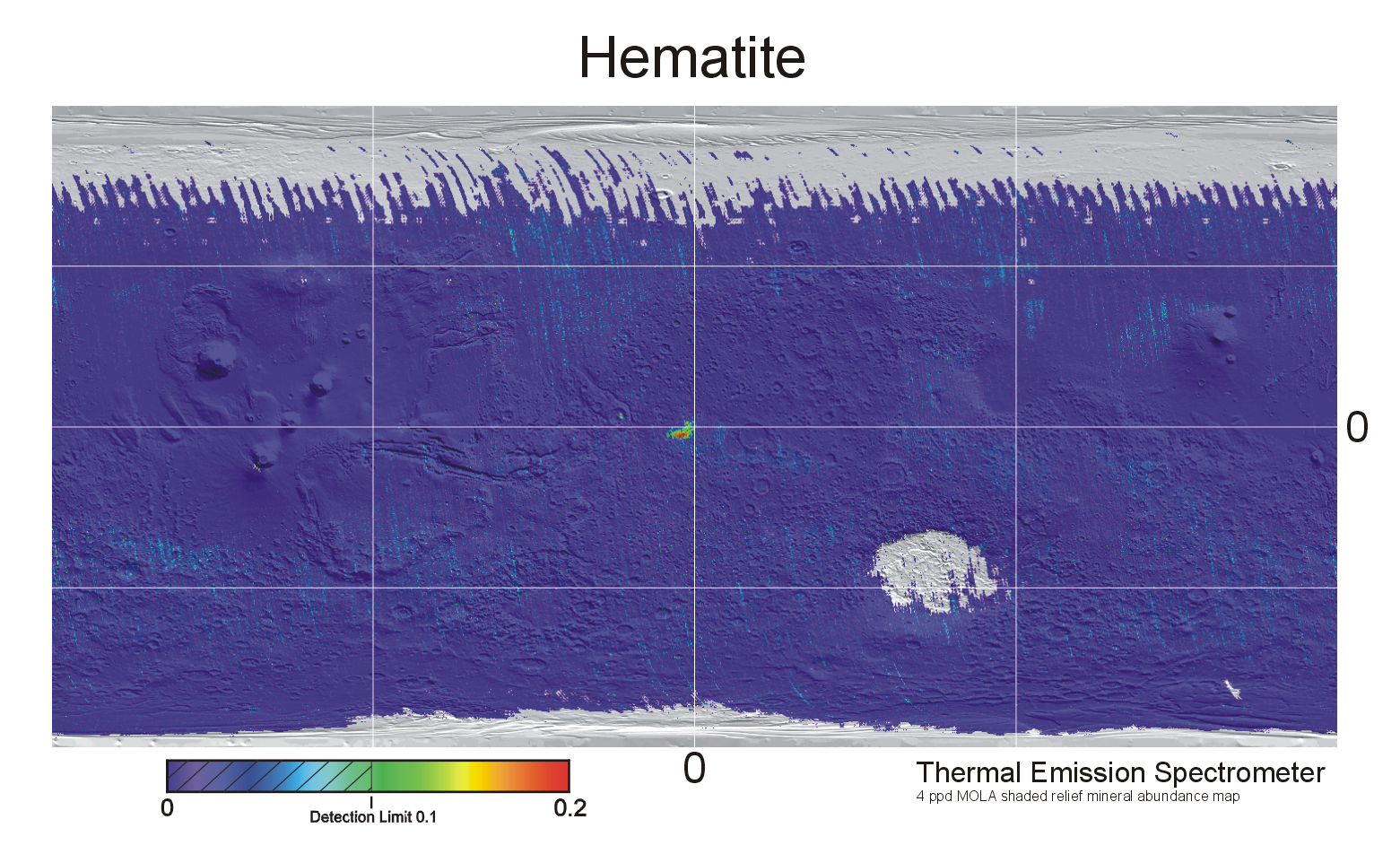
Figure 1a. A low-resolution map across all of Mars of surface hematite levels. Data for this map was produced by the thermal emission spectrometer (TES) on the Mars Global Surveyor between 1997 and 2002. The green and red blob in the center of the map is shown in high resolution in Figure 1b. Mapped from 1997 to 2002.

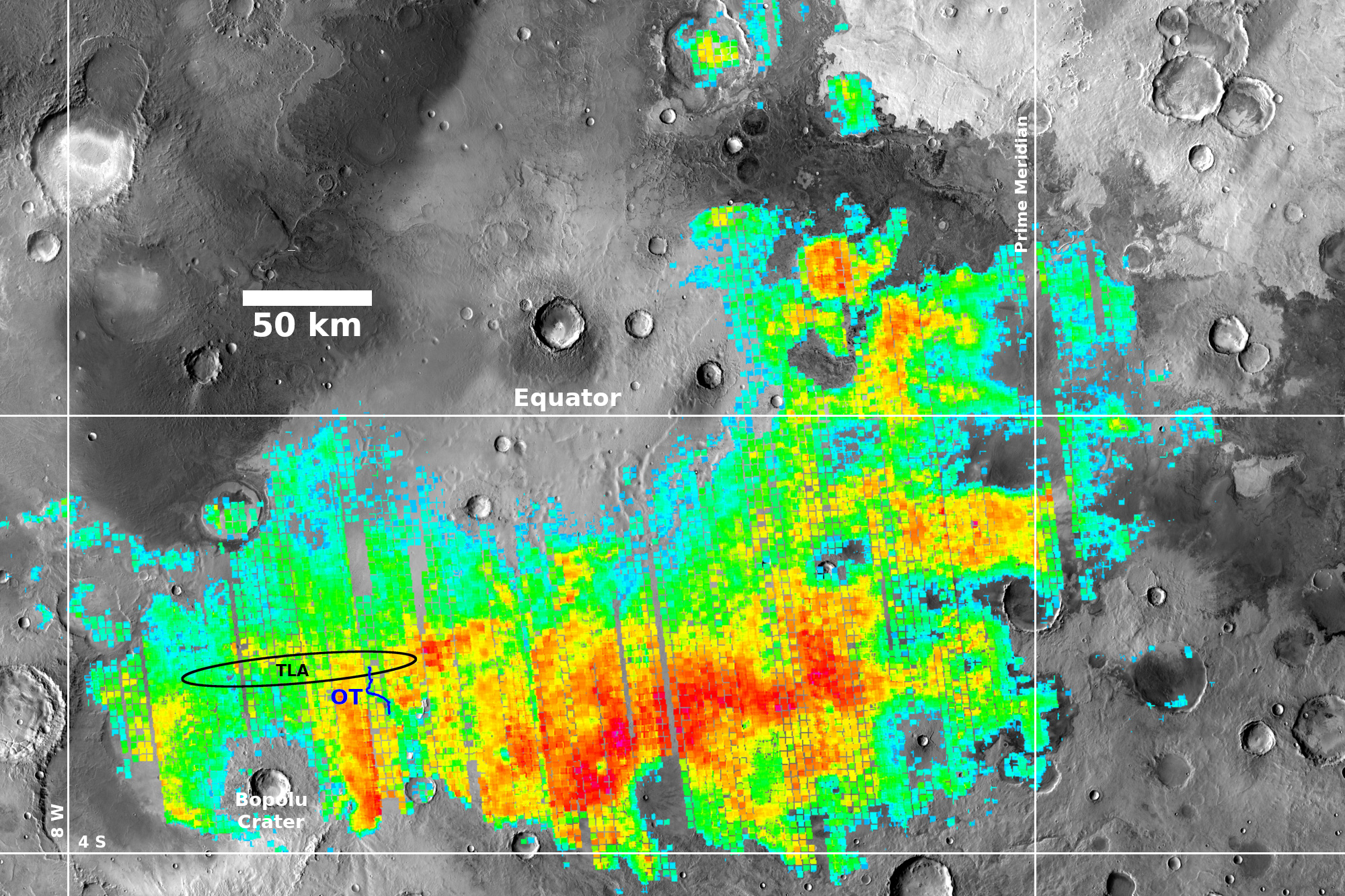
Figure 1b. Map of surface hematite levels in the region around the equator and prime meridian (now called Meridiani Planum). This is a high-resolution blow-up of the central part of Figure 1a overlaid over an image of the region. Mapped from 1997 to 2002.

=== Search for signs of water and life ===
In the 1990s, NASA officials wanted to delineate a framework for "faster, better, cheaper" exploration of Mars. In this context, the "Water Strategy" was outlined in 1995/1996. High priority goals for NASA in the mid-1990s were to gather some evidence for surface water using satellite surveys and to land robotic rovers on the surface to collect detailed local evidence of water and signs of life.

In early the 2000s, the hematite map of Figure 1b and the confirmation (from the topography mapping done by the Mars Global Surveyor) that this area is a flat plain and relatively easy to land on were the decisive pieces of evidence for choosing the Meridiani Planum as one of the landing sites for NASA's two bigger Mars Exploration Rovers (MERs), named Opportunity and Spirit. The decisiveness for NASA of the hematite map of Figure 1b for choosing the landing site for Opportunity was because NASA was using high hematite levels as proxy evidence for large amounts of liquid water flowing in the region in the past. (Hematite only forms in the presence of liquid water in geological settings). In 2003, this high-hematite region was a high-priority place to start to search for signs of life on Mars.

=== New name: Meridiani Planum ===
The hematite map of Figure 1b covered part of a larger area called the Sinus Meridiani by 19th-century Mars map-makers. In 2004, senior scientists for the upcoming MER Opportunity mission introduced the new place name Meridiani Planum for (roughly) the high hematite area in Figure 1b.

=== Discovery of spherules on the ground ===
NASA'S rover Opportunity successfully made the "hole-in-one" landing into Eagle Crater at Meridiani Planum on January 24(PST), 2004. On the first sol (Martian day), the rover immediately discovered thousands and thousands of small (4–6 mm diameter) spherules lying all over the place inside Eagle Crater.

Figure 2 shows a thumbnail of the view from Opportunity's Pancam (panoramic camera) on the first sol. (The actual image is very large, 7838 x 2915 pixels). The lead of the Pancam team, Jim Bell, soon wrote about this view: "Scientists are intrigued by the abundance of rock outcrops dispersed throughout the crater, as well as the crater's soil, which appears to be a mixture of coarse gray grains and fine reddish grains." Figure 3 is a detail of Figure 2 showing the grey spherules more clearly (click to enlarge).

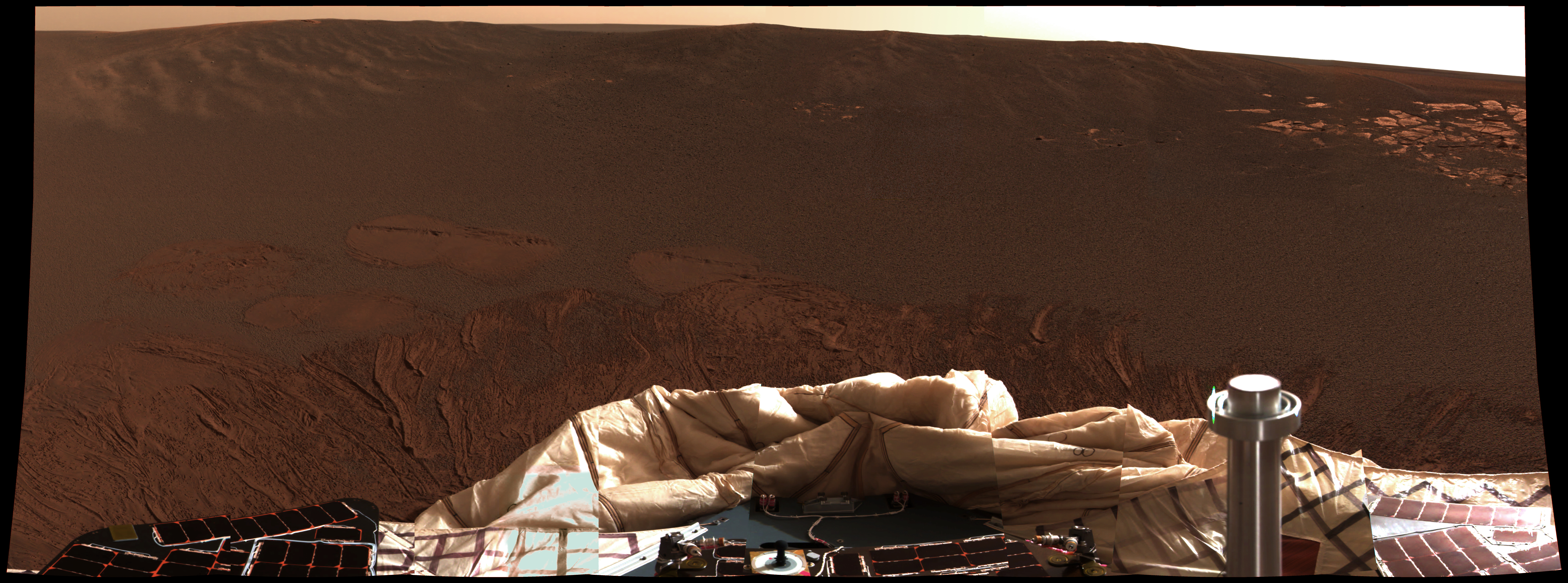
Figure 2. View from Opportunity's Pancam on sol 1. The stainless steel column in the foreground is part of the rover's communications system. The fabrics in the foreground are deflated airbags and parts of the lander system (they are not part of the rover). In the near-middle-ground are soils compacted by the lander's airbags. The rest of the image shows red soils covered in grey spherules and the rim of Eagle Crater. A lighter rocky outcrop of the crater's rim is in the right background. Image taken on Sol 1 (2004-01-24).

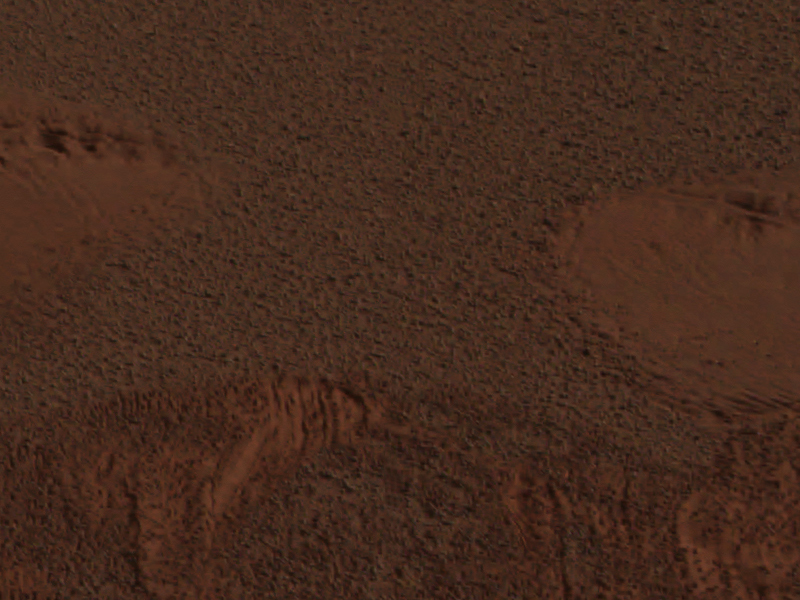
Figure 3. This image is a detail of Figure 2. It covers a middle-ground portion of Figure 2 where the airbag compacted soils meet undisturbed soils covered in the grey spherules. Click the image to enlarge it for a better resolution of the grey spherules. Image taken on Sol 1 (2004-01-24).

Tests quickly found that the grey spherules are rich in grey hematite. These tests included doing the "berry bowl" experiment (more below).

The moniker "blueberries" was coined for the grey hematite spherules by the original Opportunity science team due to these spherules appearing bluish relative to the underlying rusty-red soils in the "natural color RGB images" analyzed.

== Blueberry formation ==
Blueberries are either embedded in the large body of sediments of Meridiani Planum or they are loose blueberries that lie directly on outcrops of the sediments or lie on top soils spread over the Meridiani sediments. The loose blueberries and soils are eroded out of the underlying sediments. Both today's embedded blueberries and the loose blueberries were formed in the sediments of Meridiani Planum by "diagenetic" processes, i.e., processes that change sediments by water-rock interactions. The diagenetic processes not only formed embedded blueberries but also changed an original large body of sediments. Thus, blueberry formation was (broadly) a three-step process:

- Formation of the original body of sediments;
- Diagenetic transformation of the original sediments to produce today's sediments and embedded blueberries;
- Erosion of top layers of the sediments to form top soils and loose blueberries.

Each of these broad steps involved multiple sub-step processes, described in the following sub-sections:

=== Noachian river flows ===
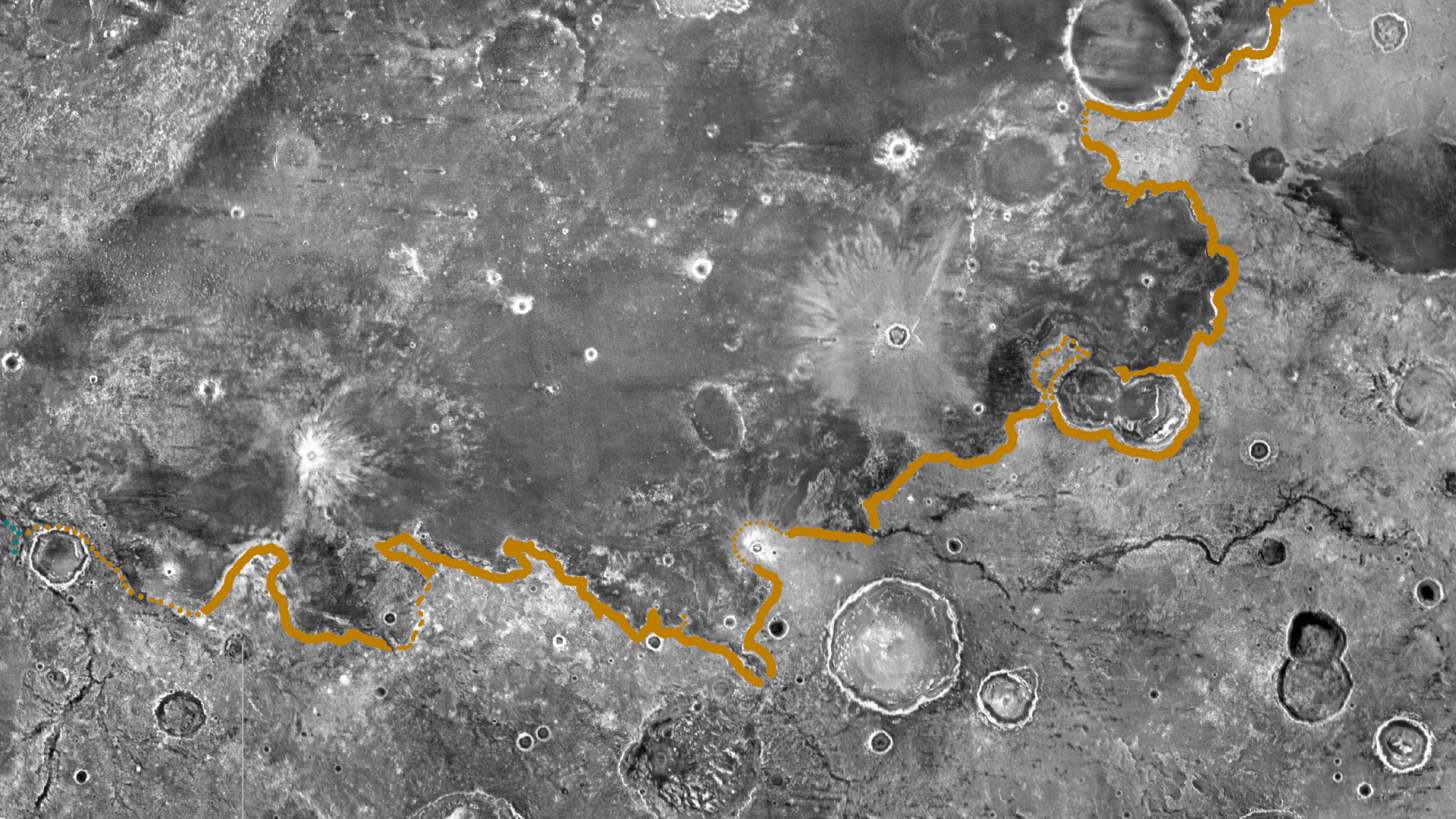
Figure 4. Thermal inertia map of the southern half of Meridiani Planum and a region to the south. Dried-up river valleys are visible in the region to the south. They end at the plain. The map was made from orbit by the THEMIS instrument.

Prior to the formation of Meridiani's defining sediments, in the wet Noachian (named for the biblical Noah) more than about ~3.7 billion years ago, liquid water was present and plentiful enough to form river channels that bought and deposited large quantities of basaltic silt to the current Meridiani region. The dried river valleys are easily seen in thermal inertia images taken in orbit by Mars Odyssey and reproduced in Figure 4 (click on it for higher resolution). The river valleys seen in Figure 4 terminate abruptly as they flow into the Meridiani's massive formation of sediments.

=== Formation of today's sediments and embedded spherules ===
From around the late-Noachian/early-Hesperian to sometime around 3.5 billion years ago, the layered sediments deposited in the earlier Noachian epoch were transformed. This transformation probably included a significant additional deposition of high-sulfur-content material of volcanic origin. The change certainly included aqueous geochemistry that was acidic and salty, as well as rising & falling water levels: Features providing evidence include cross-bedded sediments, the presence of vugs (cavities), and embedded hematite spherules that cut across sediment layers, additionally the presence of large amounts of magnesium sulfate and other sulfate-rich minerals such as jarosite and chlorides. Jarosite formation requires aqueous acidic conditions below pH 3.

Figures 5 and 6 show Microscopic Imager close-ups of the sediment rock matrix that appeared in a prestigious paper. Figure 5 illustrates the four physical constituents of sediment outcrop: (i) the sedimentary layers containing a lot of basaltic sand particles; (ii) the embedded hematite spherules; (iii) fine-grained, sulfate-rich cement (in most parts of the outcrop); (iv) vug cavities (that are thought to be molds for crystals of, for example, hydrated sulfates). Figure 6 images a similar sediment outcrop surface to Figure 5. However, Opportunity's Rock Abrasion Tool abraded this surface. Such abrasions showed that (a) the sediment layers are very soft and easy to cut, and (b) the hematite spherules have uniform internal structures.

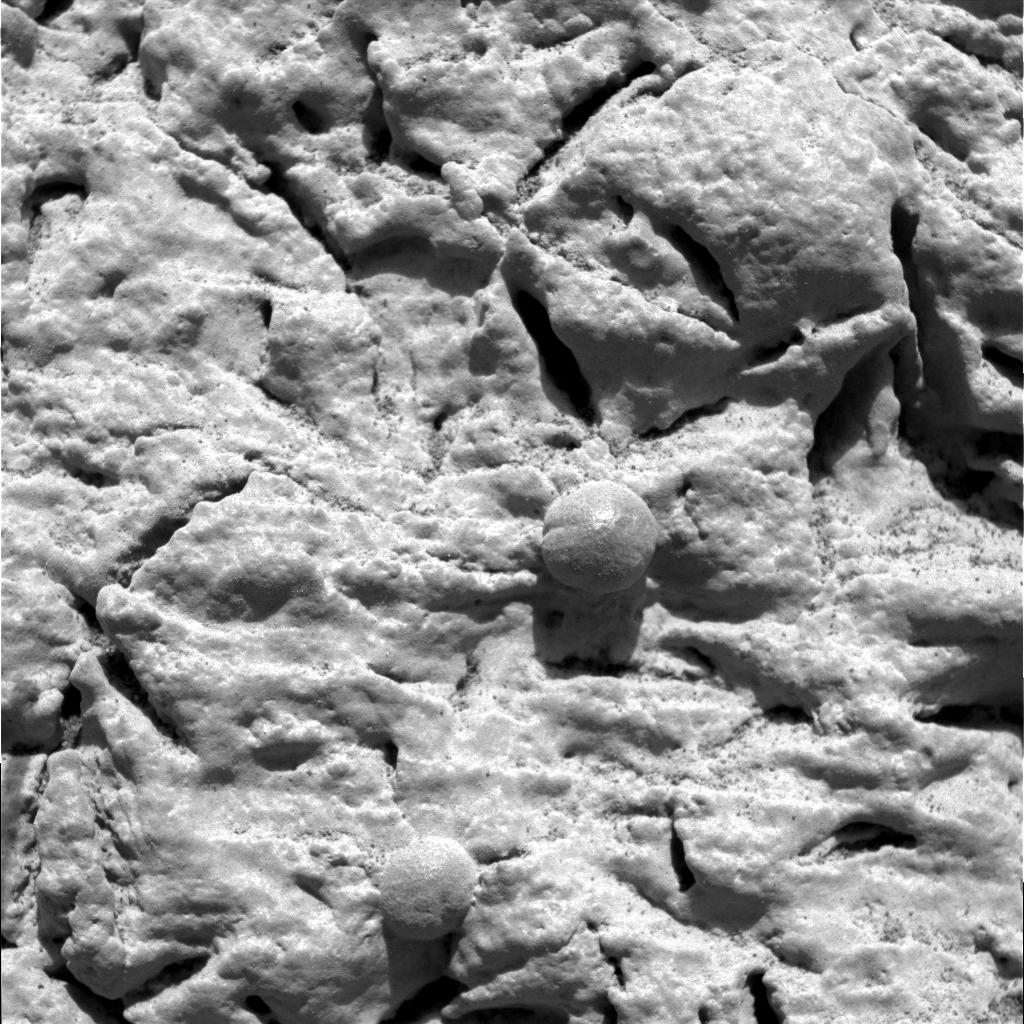
Figure 5. Close-up of sediment matrix with embedded hematite spherules at Eagle Crater. The central (partially embedded) spherule is 3.7 mm in diameter. The image covers an approximate 32 mm x 32 mm area. It was taken on Sol 29 (2004-02-24).

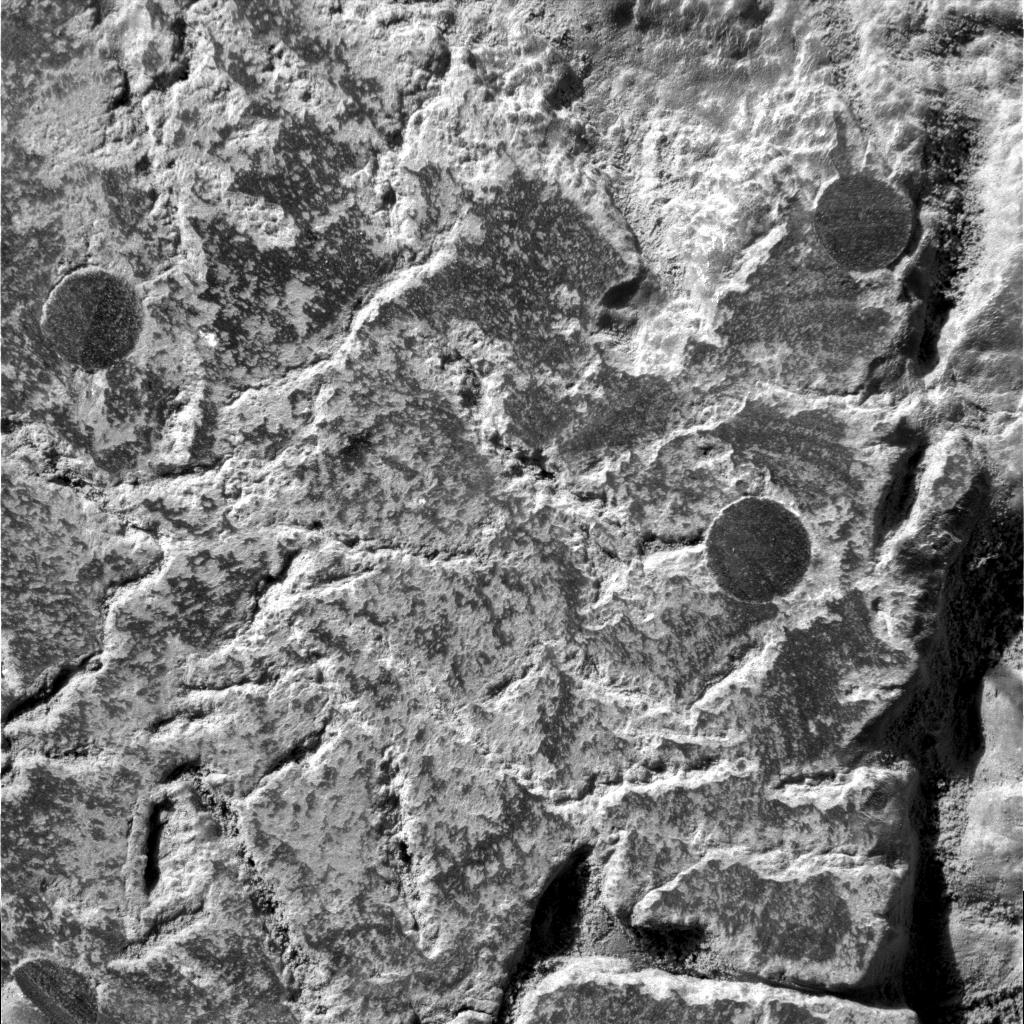
Figure 6. Close-up of sediment matrix and embedded hematite spherules abraded by Opportunity's Rock Abrasion Tool. This Eagle Crater image covers an approximate 32 mm x 32 mm area. It was taken on Sol 34 (2004-02-29).

The diagenetic transformation (i.e., change by water-rock interactions) to today's sediments involved a significant shift in water flows in the region. The inflows from rivers became less, and the dominant water movements in the sediments became vertical with rising and falling aquifer levels. At least one model of global Martian hydrology accounts for the historical shift in water flows at Meridiani Planum. This model links Meridiani's change in water flows to activity in the volcanic Tharsis region. With the vertical aquifer flows, it is believed that (playa) lakes repeatedly formed and disappeared as the aquifer levels rose and fell. (The dry area around Utah's Great Salt Lake is a playa.)

McLennan and his students constructed a geochemical model that generates hematite within a context like the Meridiani sediment.

The hematite formed into spherules by concretion (when minerals came out of solution). The concretion process to form spherules of hematite probably occurred by diffusion of the hematite through the sedimentary rock matrix.

=== Formation of soils and loose spherules, crater degradation ===
The period of rising and falling aquifer levels ceased, and no water flowed on Meridiani Planum thereafter. Although, when this happened is poorly understood. Estimates include around 3.5 billion years ago and about 3 billion years ago. The only water left at the plain is bound in rocks.

Erosion with water flows in earlier eras was much faster than in this arid epoch. However, erosion did not stop. Other much slower erosional processes continued and became the primary agents of change to the plain. This slower change was and is driven by meteorite impacts, the wind, and gravity. Over the hard-to-grasp eon of around three billion years, meteorite impacts and the wind formed the sandy top soils and loose hematite spherules and sorted these into the layered soil bedforms that we can now see.

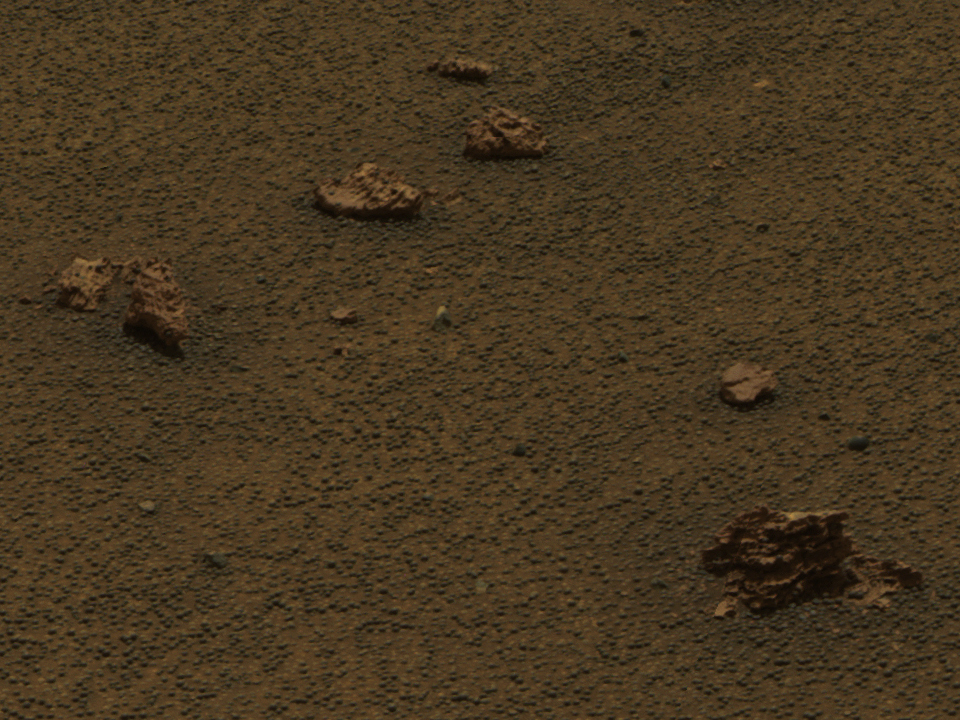
Figure 7. Detail showing hematite spherules eroding out of blocks of sediment ejecta. It is better to click and enlarge this. Notice the increased surface density of loose spherules lying in rings around the small clocks of sediment ejecta. This image is cropped out of a larger image taken on Sol 1162 (2007-05-01).

The meteorite, gravity, and wind-driven processes work like this:

- Over billions of years, meteorite impacts created many craters on the plain.
- There were enough small (5 to 30 m diameter) craters created in the eon of around three billion years to cover, on average, the whole plain once. Although, each small crater degraded and disappeared in about 25 million years or less, and only about 0.7% of the plain's area is presently covered in small craters.
- Each meteorite impact produces large numbers of blocks of sediment material in the crater rim and as ejecta around the crater.
- Most of the initial sediment blocks project above the surrounding material (by a few centimeters or more) and are exposed to saltating sand (i.e., wind-driven, bouncing sand).
- Meridiani sediment matrix is soft and easy-to-erode. It erodes about 30 to 300 times faster than other regions of Mars (such as Gusev Crater). (Although, this arid erosion is much slower than erosion with water flows.)
- The saltating sand erodes the soft, easy-to-erode parts of the sediment matrix in the projecting blocks.
- These blocks are either completely eroded or erode until they become smooth and no longer project into saltating sand.
- This block erosion creates dust particles and turns embedded spherules into loose spherules.
- The dust particles are blown off the plain and become part of the global dust.
- The sulfates preferentially turn into dust and are transported off the plain by the wind.
- The larger basalt sand particles, spherules fragments, and hematite spherules remain in place on the plain.
- Wind, gravity, and size-sorting created the soil bedforms from the basaltic sands, spherule fragments, and spherules.
- With the aid of gravity and wind, the original (small) crater holes are gradually filled in (with material from eroded rim blocks and other local erosion material), and the plain is returned to a flat state.

Phil Christensen outlined these processes in 2004, soon after Opportunity landed. Later, more in-depth research confirmed them and added details to Christensen's outline.

== Blueberry composition ==
=== Early Blueberry composition results ===
Early on, Opportunity's Mössbauer spectrometer took data that determined that the iron mineral component of these spherules is dominated by hematite. However, the Mössbauer spectrometer provided no information about the mineral components of these spherules that do not contain iron.

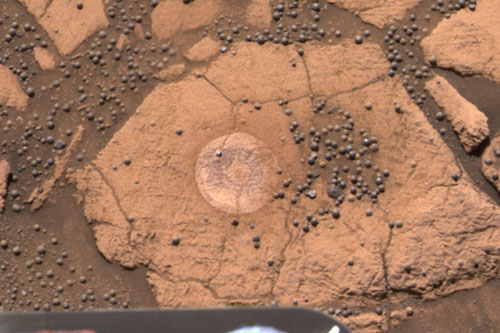
Figure 8. Site of "berry bowl" experiment. The two sampling targets are next to each other. Image taken on Sol 48 (2004-03-13).

The "berry bowl" experiment took alpha particle X-ray spectrometer (APXS) readings of two sampling targets just centimeters apart: One had no (zero or one) spherules in the spectrometer's field of view (FOV), while the other had around 25 spherules in the FOV. Figure 8 shows the adjacent "berry bowl" sampling targets. The APXS results indicated there was noticeably more iron in the target with ~25 spherules relative to the target with 0 or 1 spherules. Based on this and similar experiments, several unreviewed conference abstracts claimed (deliberately not cited here) that hematite dominated the composition of the spherules and some published papers cited these conference claims. However, there were reasons to be cautious. The instruments detected mixed signals from sampling targets that included signals not only from the spherules but also from dust and rock (in the "berry bowl" experiment) or dust and soils (in other composition data collections). In 2006, Morris et al. showed that the methods used by some researchers to pick out the spherule composition signal from the dust and soil signals were flawed and that such methods could do no more than constrain the iron oxide content of the spherules to between 24 wt% and 100 wt% (that is, almost no constraint at all).

=== Later Blueberry composition results ===
A 2008 paper published the result of a clever experiment that showed Opportunity's mini-TES (thermal emission spectrometer) could not detect any silicate minerals in the spherules. This non-detection constrained silicate levels in spherules to less than 10 wt% and probably below 8 wt%. This result is helpful since the APXS data shows a strong anti-correlation between silicates and iron oxide in the spherules - so low silicate levels indicate high iron oxide levels.

A recent paper used the mini-TES's non-detection of silicates and some improved data analysis methods to find over 340,000 allowable standard oxide chemical compositions for the spherules (allowable = consistent with the silicate non-detection). The lowest and highest weight percentages for the iron oxide content in these allowable spherule compositions were, respectively, 79.5 wt% and 99.8 wt%. While, for the large majority of the allowable compositions, the iron oxide contents in the spherules were between 85 wt% and 96 wt%; further, the nickel content was always close to 0.3 wt%, a group of five standard oxides (MgO, Na_{2}O, P_{2}O_{5}, SO_{3}, and Cl) each had content above trace-level with a combined group content of 6.8 ± 2.4 wt%, the SiO_{2} levels ranged between 8 wt% and 0 wt%, and the other eight APXS standard oxides had either 0 wt% content or only trace level content.

== Size of Blueberries ==
The Opportunity science team published three papers that studied variations in hematite spherule size. They found spherule size variation by location and elevation.

In the earliest paper, a team of Opportunity rover scientists reported on studies of all the soil materials found between the landing site in Eagle Crater to the location on sol 552 of the rover's traverse (between Endurance Crater and Victoria Crater). They found that in a sample of 696 blueberries, disregarding any non-spherical blueberries from the sample, the blueberries' average major axis to be about 2.87 mm (just over one-tenth inch). They also discovered that blueberries found within soils are typically smaller than blueberries found in the outcrops. They noted the size of the blueberries tends to decrease with decreasing latitude.

The Opportunity team found many fragmented blueberries and suggested the fracturing occurred after spherule formation. They believe the fracturing either be from meteoric impacts or the "same process" that "fractured the outcrop". However, the team notes this would not explain the presence of the smallest hematite spherules detected. The smallest are close to perfectly spherical and therefore cannot be explained by fracturing or erosion. The Opportunity team also found that blueberries uncovered by the Rock Abrasion Tool aboard Opportunity were 4.2 ± 0.9 mm (0.16 inches) major axis length at Eagle Crater and 4.5 ± 0.6 mm at Endurance crater, about 2.2 ± 0.5 mm (0.087 inches) at Vostok and about 3.0 ± 0.2 mm (0.12 inches) at Naturaliste (crater). Those found in "the plains" south of Endurance Crater were smaller (1-2mm or 0.04-0.08 inches) than those of Eagle and Endurance craters.

The second paper studying spherule size extended the study area 2–3 km further south on the plains to Victoria Crater. This paper reported similar observations to the first but went further to suggest the observed size variation might be due to sampling different sediment stratigraphic levels at different locations. Additionally, it suggested simple variations in diagenetic conditions were linked to changes in spherule size.

The third paper made systematic size measurements of hematite spherules embedded in the walls of Victoria Crater at different heights. (Victoria Crater is a large and deep crater.) These measurements showed a clear variation of spherule size with elevation within the sediments of Meridiani Planum. The smaller spherules were higher up, the larger ones lower down. The lowest spherules near the bottom of Victoria Crater had similar diameters to the spherules in Eagle Crater, and the elevations of these distant locations were nearly equal.

No papers were written on spherule size that covered areas of the rover's traverse south from Victoria Crater to the enormous Endeavour Crater. However, searches of the archive of the images taken by the rover's Microscopic Imager show some of the largest blueberries photographed are close to the rim of Endeavour Crater (see Figure 11).

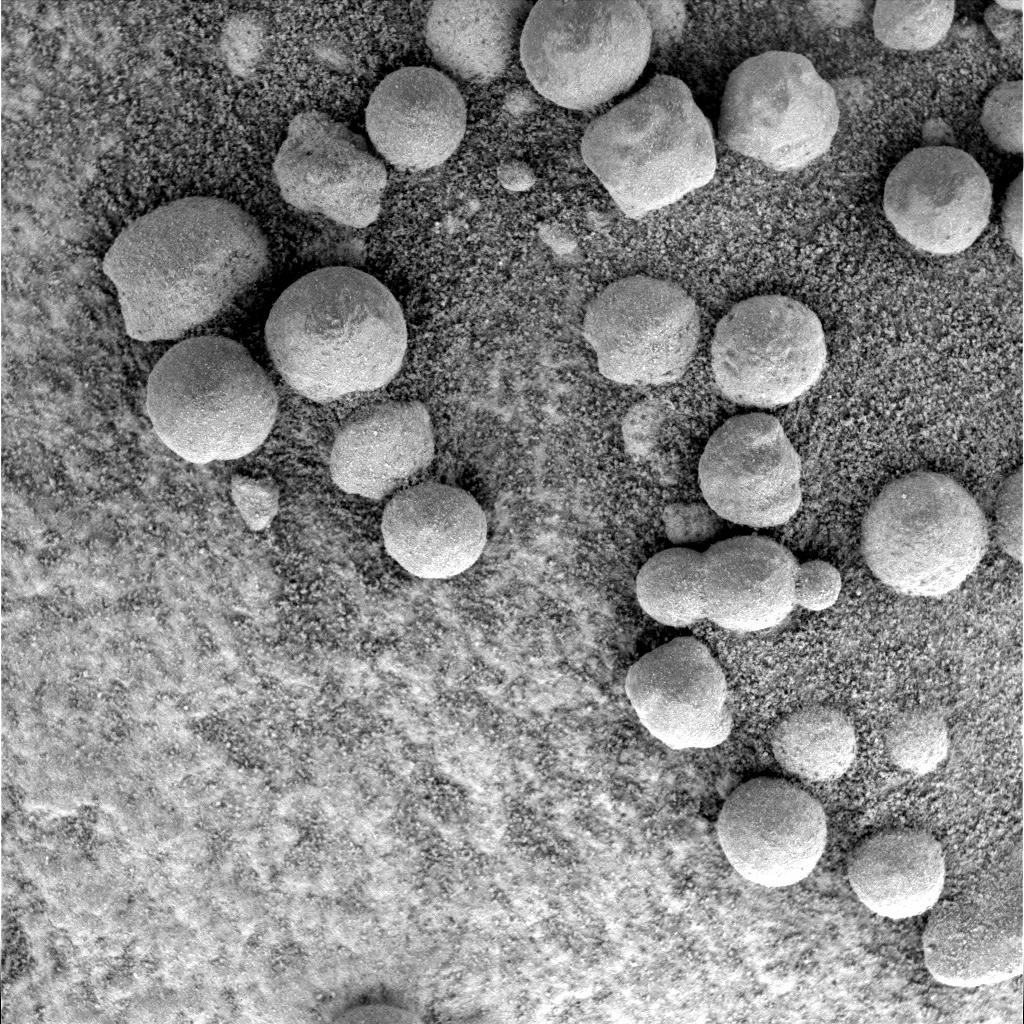
Figure 9. Loose hematite spherules on an outcrop of sediments at Eagle Crater. At this location, most spherule diameters were 4 - 6 mm; in this image, the range is 3 - 6 mm. Image taken on Sol 46 (2004-03-10).

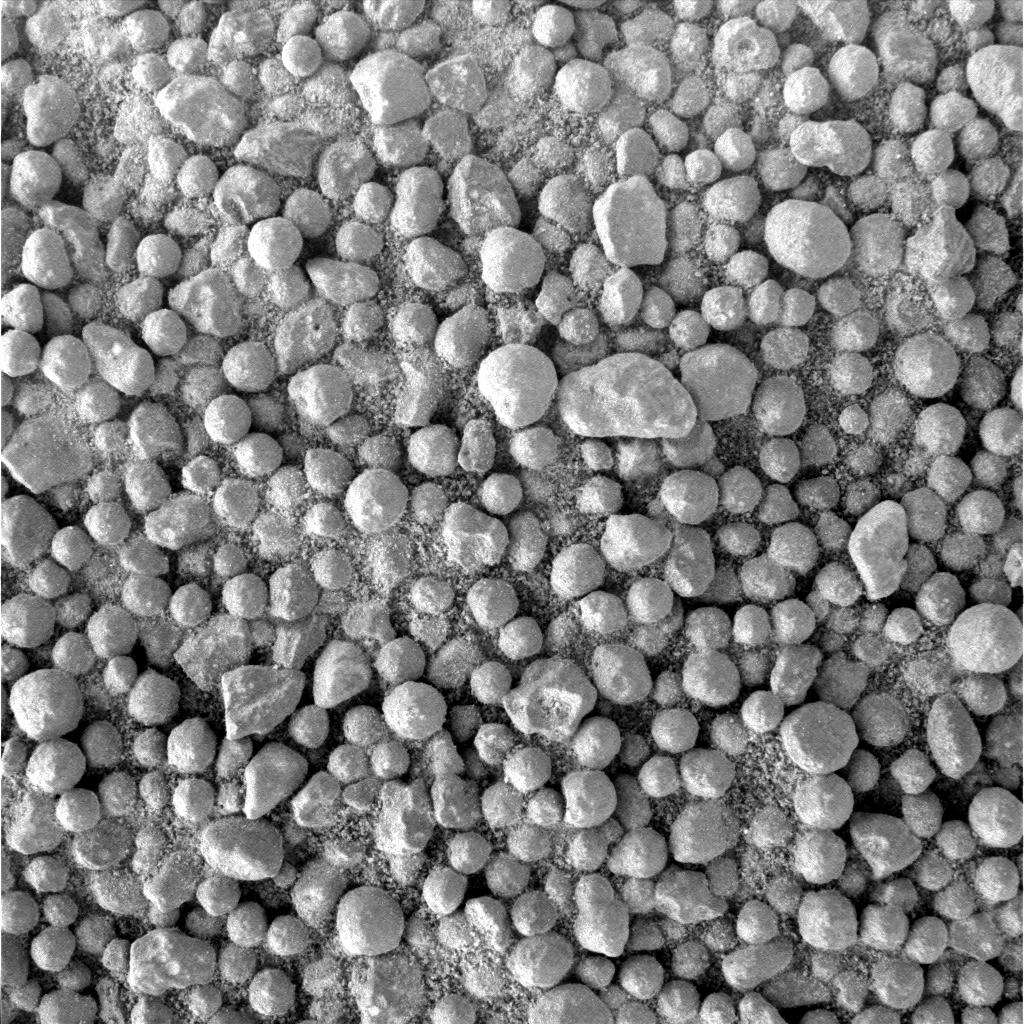
Figure 10. Small, loose hematite spherules on soils about 500 m northwest of Victoria Crater. In this image, most spherules have 1 - 2 mm diameters. A few have diameters under 1 mm, and the largest is 2.5 mm x 4 mm. Image taken on Sol 910 (2004-08-15).

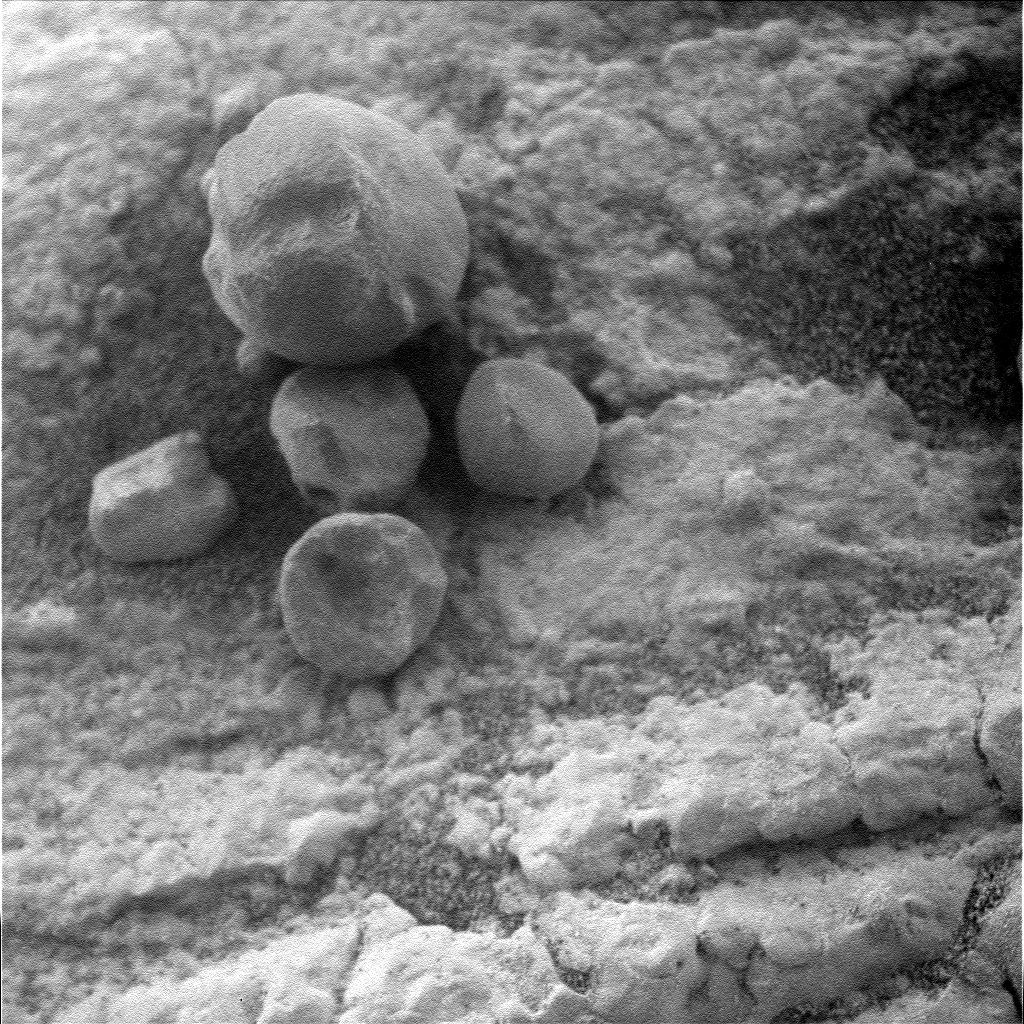
Figure 11. A few loose hematite spherules on an outcrop of sediments about 200 m from Endeavour Crater. The largest spherule has a diameter of 8.3 mm - this is one of the biggest photographed anywhere by Opportunity. Image taken on Sol 2669 (2011-07-28).

== Numbers of Blueberries and loose spherule surface density ==
There are no peer-reviewed published estimates of the number of loose hematite spherules on Meridiani's soils or embedded hematite spherules in the plain's sediments. However, the reader can sense how mind-boggling big those numbers are with a photograph of an area of soil with a typical surface density of the hematite spheres. Such a photograph has been published.

Figures 12 and 13 are true-color and false-color versions of the photo. The spherules are easier to see in the published false-color version (Figure 23). Click on it to enlarge it. The sampling target of Figures 12 & 13 had 29% coarse hematite coverage. The range of coverage among similar targets was 10% to 40%. These targets were sampled over a wide area, between Sol 70 (2004-04-04) and Sol 999 (2007-11-15).

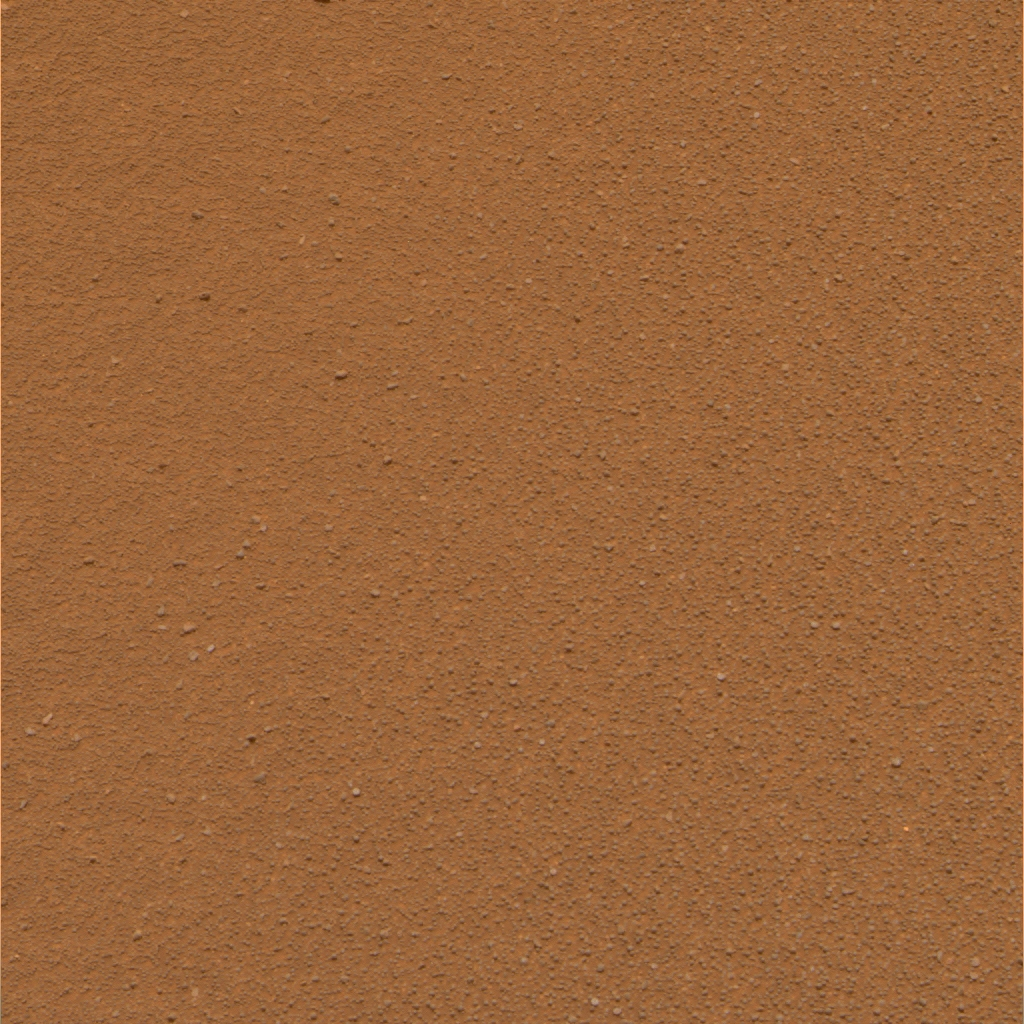
Figure 12. This (approximate true color) image is a surface hematite sampling target taken by Opportunity's Pancam on Sol 532. This target was measured to have 29% coarse hematite coverage. Image taken on Sol 532 (2005-07-02).

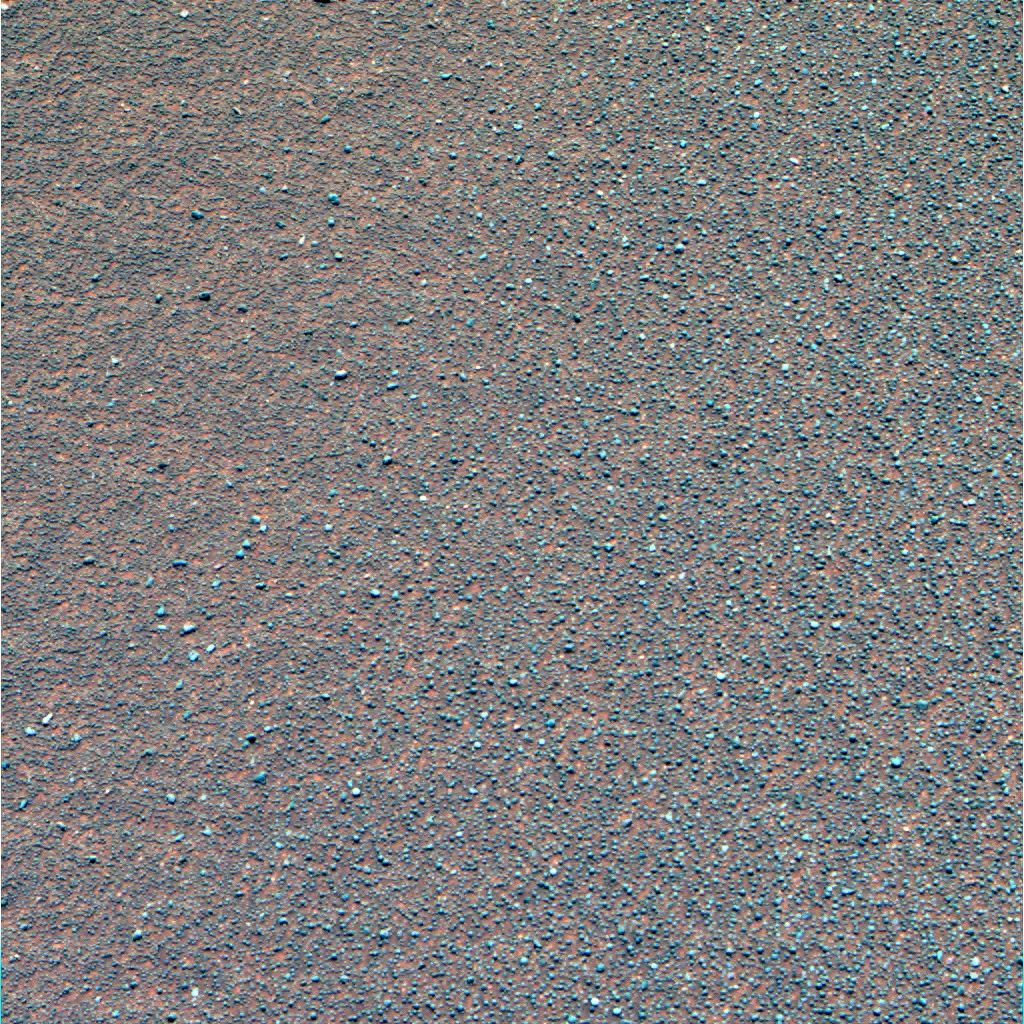
Figure 13. This is a false color version of Figure 12. The hematite spherules are easier to resolve in false color. Image taken on Sol 532 (2005-07-02).

The parts of the plain Opportunity studied are not special: Compared to the rest of Meridiani Planum, they do not have high surface hematite levels. To see this, look at the plain's surface hematite map (Figure 1b) and the small blue line (labeled OT ) indicating the route of Opportunity's Traverse of the plain.

The mind-bogglingness of the number of loose hematite spherules hits when Figures 12 & 13 are extrapolated to the plain's whole surface area (about 150,000 km^{2}): 150,000 km^{2} is close to 2/3's the area of the main island of Japan (Honshu) and also 72% the area of the main island of the UK (Great Britain), it is also bigger than the land areas of 30 of the 50 states of the USA.

The number of embedded spherules (in the plain's sediments) is probably much higher than the number of loose spherules (on soils). Since (1) the estimates of the erosion depth of original sediment needed to produce the loose spherules are less than 1 meter, while (2) the typical depths of the plain's sediments are several hundred meters.

== Shiny Blueberries without dust ==
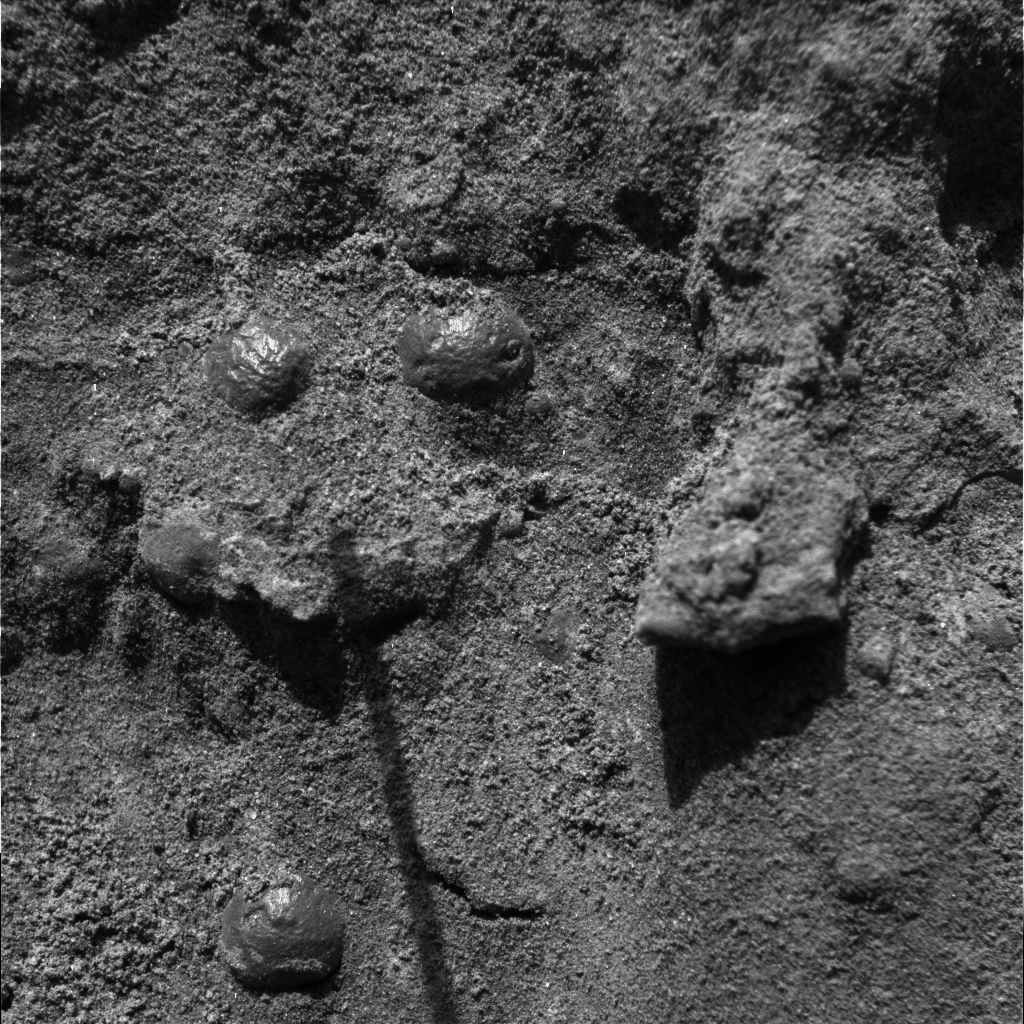
Figure 14. Shiny spherules in the walls of a newly dug trench. Image taken in February 2004.

The image at right (Figure 14) shows shiny hematite blueberries. The shininess and the position of these blueberries are unusual. The rover Opportunity dug a trench into the top soils that lie over the Meridiani Planum's sediments. Figure 14 shows a wall to the newly dug trench with (partially uncovered) soil-embedded blueberries. Soil-embedded blueberries are rare. Size-sorting tends to position loose blueberries on or very near the surface of soil bedforms. Almost all photographed blueberries were exposed to the atmosphere and are now covered in a layer of Mars's dust. The layers of dust take away the shininess of the blueberries. The blueberries inside the trench are dust-free because the interiors of soil beds are largely dust-free. Without the dust, these blueberries are shiny.

== Blueberries on Earth ==
=== Earth analogs ===
Researchers from the University of Utah have explored the similarities between the blueberries and spherical concretions discovered within "Jurassic Navajo Sandstone" in southern Utah. They have concluded Mars must have had previous ground water activity to form the blueberries. However, they do note the spherules are more spherical in the Martian sample due to the lack of "joints, fractures, faults, or other preferential fluid paths", unlike the Utah sample. A team of researchers from Japan studied the spherules found in Utah as well as spherules that were later discovered in Mongolia, in the Gobi. They found evidence that the concretions found in these locations are first formed as "spherical calcite concretions" in sandstone. Acidic water rich in iron then dissolve the calcite leaving behind the iron rich (hematite) spherule. This leads to the conclusion that the blueberries may have formed early in Mars's history when the atmosphere was more dense by the same process.

== See also ==
- Meridiani Planum – Equatorial plain on Mars
- Opportunity rover – NASA Mars rover deployed in 2004
- Mars Global Surveyor – NASA orbiter mission to Mars (1996–2006)
- 2001 Mars Odyssey – NASA orbiter for geology and hydrology
- Moqui Marbles – Geologic formation in the southwestern United States
- List of surface features of Mars imaged by Opportunity – Features recorded by 2004–2018 missions
