= Mars carbon dioxide ice cloud =

Mars's atmosphere is predominantly composed of CO_{2} (around 95%) with seasonal air pressure change that facilitates the vaporization and condensation of carbon dioxide. The CO_{2} cycle on the planet Mars has facilitated the formation of CO_{2} ice clouds at various locations and seasons on the red planet. Due to low temperatures, especially at Mars's polar caps, carbon dioxide gas can freeze in Mars’s atmosphere to form ice crystallized clouds. Several missions, such as the Viking, Mars Global Surveyor, and Mars Express, have led to interesting observations and measurements regarding CO_{2} ice clouds. MOLA data in addition to TES spectra have documented ice clouds forming during the winter season of Mars’s northern and southern polar caps. In addition, the Curiosity rover has imaged clouds well above 60 kilometers in the sky at the planet’s equator during the coldest time of Mars’s orbital year (when Mars is furthest away from the Sun due to its elliptical orbit), indicating the possibility of CO_{2} ice clouds around the planet’s equator. Although further data collection is needed to confirm the formation of CO_{2} ice clouds on Mars, especially at the planet’s equator, previous measurements have developed a strong argument for frozen carbon dioxide clouds on Mars.

== CO_{2} ice clouds at Mars's polar caps ==
The Mars Global Surveyor, launched on November 7, 1996, has been an effective spacecraft that has orbited and measured the surface of Mars thousands of times. Among the various instruments on the Mars Global Surveyor, the Mars Orbiter Laser Altimeter (MOLA) and Thermal Emission Spectrometer (TES) are used to map the topography of Mars and study the surface and atmosphere of the planet. During the winter season on Mars, temperatures at the planet’s polar caps can reach below CO_{2}’s condensation temperature (150 K). Noted as orbit #10075 by Dr. Ivanov and Dr. Muheleman of the Mars Global Surveyor, data from the MOLA instrument recorded cloud returns at the planet’s south polar cap during the southern winter season. A dense amount of data collection was collected around -77 through -80 degrees latitude. The TES instrument, capable of thermal infrared spectroscopy to measure Mars’s surface and atmosphere, recorded temperature values for orbit #10075 that proved the atmosphere’s ability to condense CO_{2}. The collection of cloud returns in addition to temperatures at C_{O2}’s solid-state property provides a strong argument for carbon dioxide ice clouds to tend to form at the planet’s southern polar cap during the southern winter season. In addition, measurements from the MOLA instrument, Mars Climate Sounder (MCS), and the Martian General Circulation Model (MGCM), point to cloud formations on the planet's north polar cap during the northern winter season. Similar to the southern polar cap, temperatures during the winter season at Mars's northern polar cap make it possible for CO_{2} ice clouds to form. Calculations from the MGCM have determined ice clouds can form up to 40 kilometers in the sky at an altitude of 70 degrees north latitude. Circulation models have proven to be consistent with measurements from the Mars Climate Sounder (MCS).

== CO_{2} ice clouds observed at Mars equator ==
8-frame movie of CO_{2} ice clouds traveling well above the Mars Curiosity rover on December 12th, 2021 (images documented by NASA JPL and movie created at York University).

Images from the Curiosity rover show clouds nearly 80 kilometres high in Mars’s sky. Due to the low temperatures (below 150 K) at that altitude, the clouds were probably composed of CO_{2} or dry ice, as opposed to water ice The interesting observation from the Curiosity rover is that carbon dioxide cloud formations were documented around Mars’s equator. Interpolations of several images show faint clouds traveling above the Curiosity rover just after sunset. In addition, the documented images were taken as Mars was furthest away from the sun due to its oval-like orbit, providing a cold enough climate around the Martian equator for carbon dioxide to condense and form clouds.
