= Sinus Meridiani =

Albedo feature on Mars

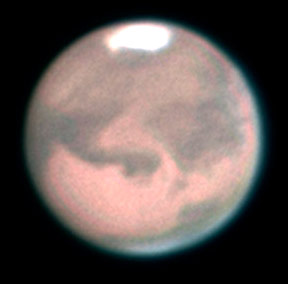
- Sinus Meridiani, seen as the dark region just below the centre of the image at the end of the protrusion from the left (Sinus Sabaeus)
- Coordinates: 0°N 0°E
- Eponym: Meridian Bay

Sinus Meridiani (Latin Sinus meridiani, "Meridian Bay") is an albedo feature on Mars stretching east-west just south of the planet's equator. It was named by the French astronomer Camille Flammarion in the late 1870s.

In 1979-2001, the vicinity of this feature—with size about 1,600 kilometers (990 mi) and coordinates of the center 7.12°S 4°E—was named Terra Meridiani.

== Observational history ==
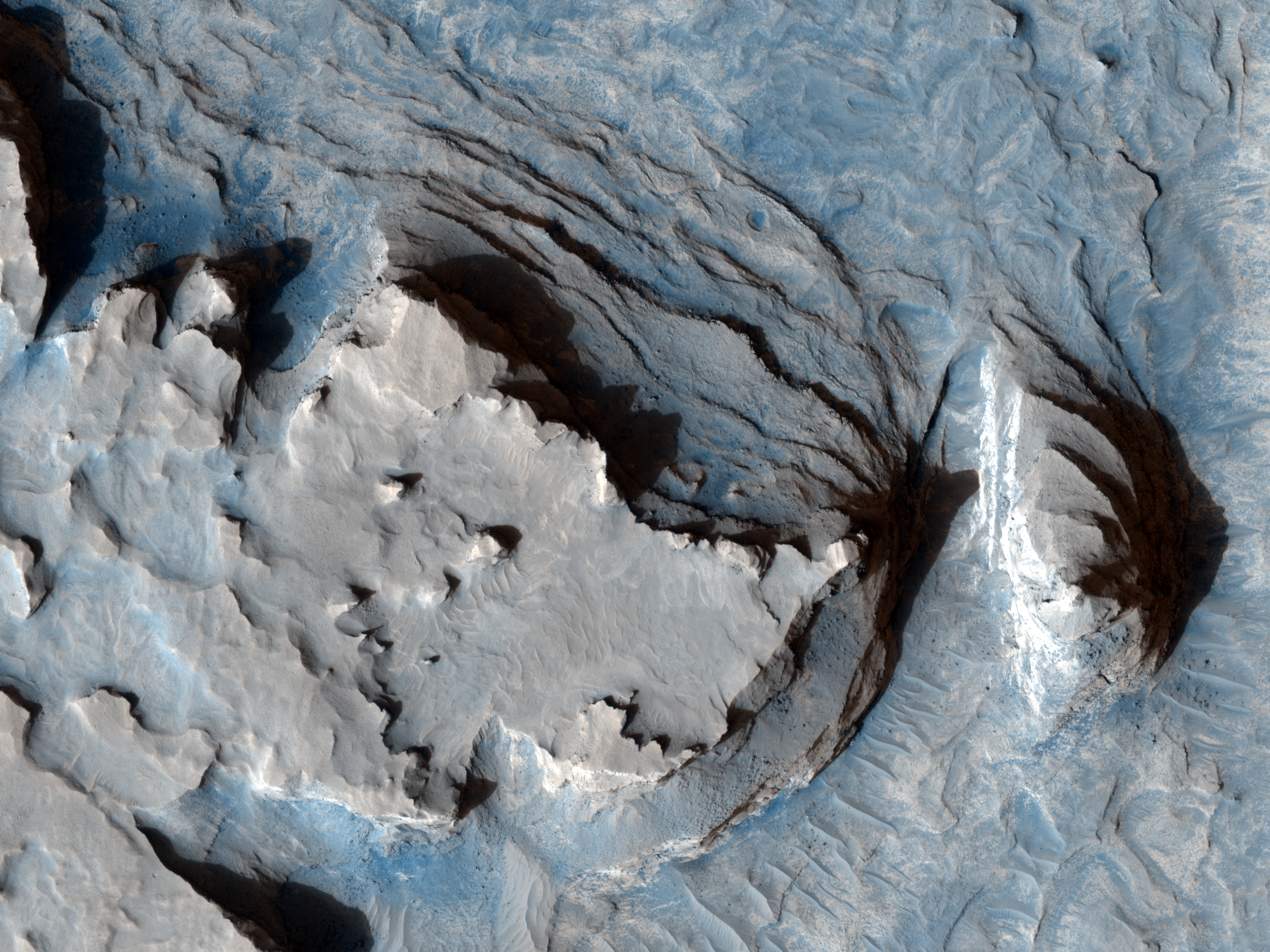
This image shows an arcuate ridge in Terra Meridiani.

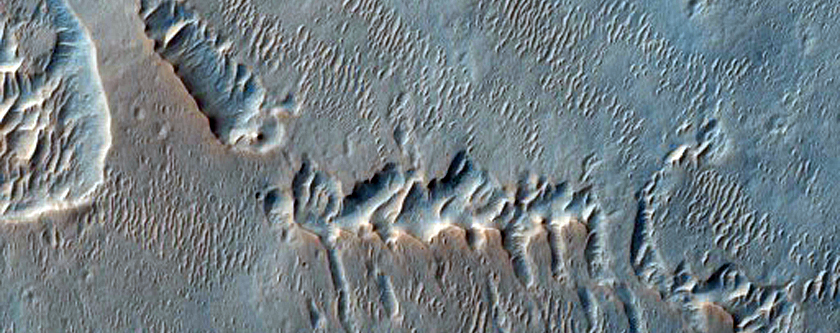
Enigmatic ridges in Terra Meridiani from HiRISE, 2012. Terra Meridiani is one of the more complex regions on Mars.

The name Sinus Meridiani was given to a classic albedo feature on Mars by the French astronomer Camille Flammarion in the late 1870s. Prior astronomers, notably the German team of Wilhelm Beer and Johann Heinrich von Mädler and then the Italian Giovanni Schiaparelli, had chosen a particular point on Mars as being the location of its prime meridian when they charted their observations. Accepting suggestions that dark areas on the surface of Mars were seas or oceans, Flammarion named a dark area at that point "Sinus Meridiani," literally "Meridian Bay," when he worked on his compilation and analysis of all prior observations of Mars. In 1958, this name was approved by International Astronomical Union.

Since the 1960s, when flybys and access to orbital spacecraft imagery of Mars began to become commonplace, many relief features were named in addition to previously named albedo features. In 1979, a region of Sinus Meridiani was named Terra Meridiani, literally "Meridian Land." In 2001, boundaries of regional features were redefined, and this name was dropped.

== Meridiani Planum ==
The name Meridiani Planum, literally "Meridian Plain," is used to refer specifically to the landing site of Mars Exploration Rover Opportunity, in the western portion of Sinus Meridiani. This site was chosen by the Mars Exploration Rover team both for its characteristic as a flat and mostly rock-free plain (and hence a safe landing site), and also as a site which showed the spectral signature of the mineral hematite, which is often a sign of deposition in an aqueous environment.

=== Analysis by Opportunity ===
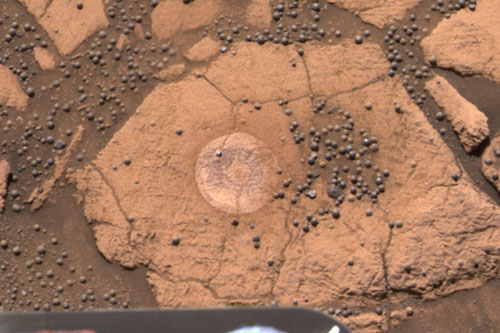
The rock "Berry Bowl."

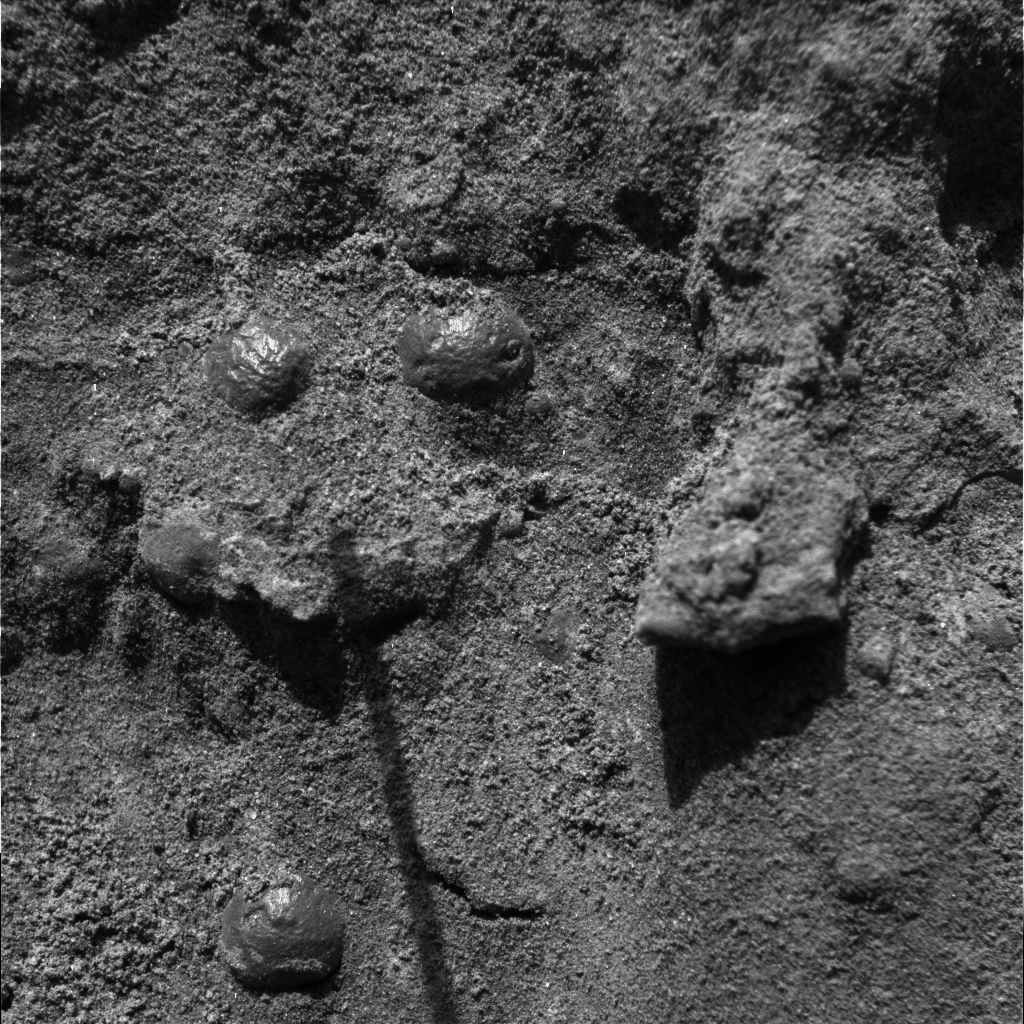
This image, taken by the microscopic imager, reveals shiny, spherical objects embedded within the trench wall

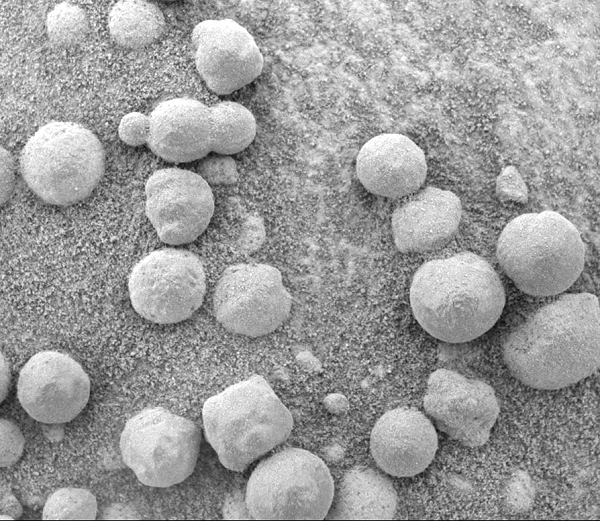
"Blueberries" (hematite spheres) on a rocky outcrop at Eagle Crater. Note the merged triplet in the upper left.

The Opportunity rover found that the soil at Meridiani Planum was very similar to the soil at Gusev crater and Ares Vallis; however, in many places at Sinus Meridiani, the soil was covered with round, hard, gray spherules, dubbed "blueberries." These blueberries were found to be composed almost entirely of the mineral hematite. It was decided that the spectra signal spotted from orbit by 2001 Mars Odyssey was produced by these spherules. Further studies found that the blueberries were concretions formed in the ground by water. Over time, these concretions weathered from what was overlying rock, and then became concentrated on the surface as a lag deposit. The concentration of spherules in bedrock could have produced the observed blueberry covering from the weathering of as little as one meter of rock. Most of the soil consisted of olivine basalt sands that did not come from the local rocks, and is thus speculated to have come from elsewhere.

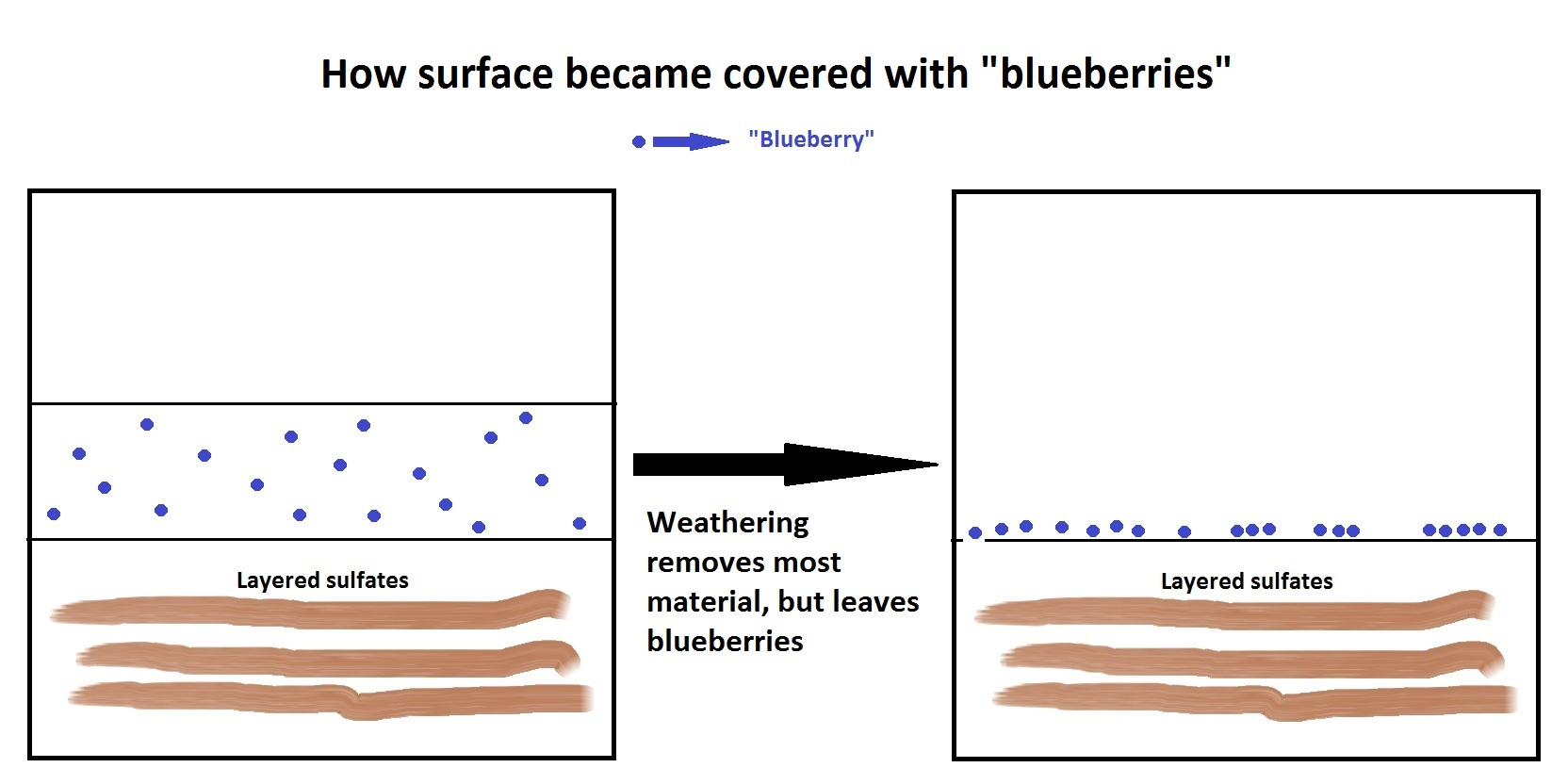
Drawing showing how "blueberries" came to cover much of surface in Meridiani Planum.

==== Minerals in dust ====
A Mössbauer spectrum was made of the dust that gathered on Opportunity's capture magnet. The results suggested that the magnetic component of the dust was titanomagnetite, rather than just plain magnetite, as was once thought. Trace amounts of olivine were also detected, which indicated a long arid period on the planet. On the other hand, a small amount of hematite that was present meant that there may have been liquid water for a short time in the early history of the planet. Because the Rock Abrasion Tool (RAT) found it easy to grind into the bedrocks, it is thought that the rocks are much softer than the rocks at Gusev crater.

==== Bedrock minerals ====
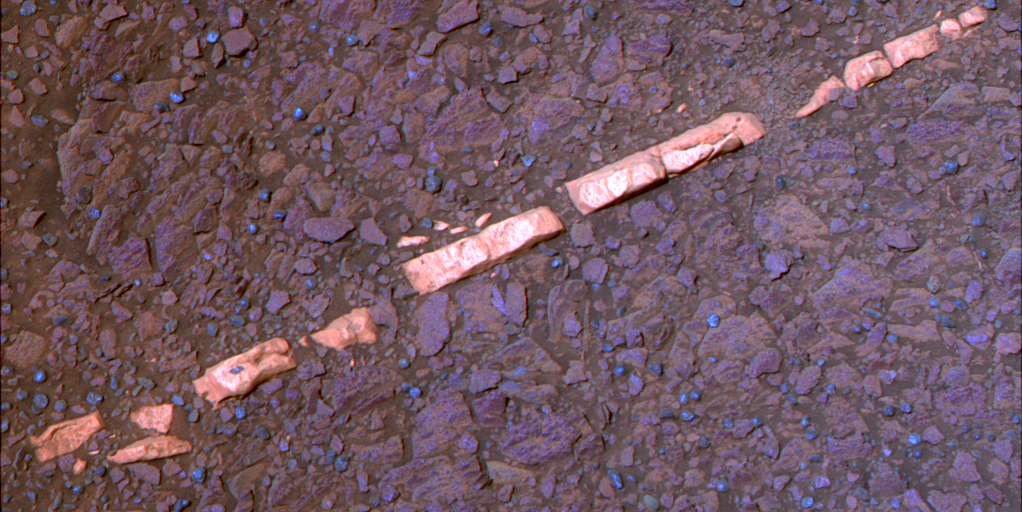
"Homestake" formation

Few rocks were visible on the surface where Opportunity landed, but bedrock that was exposed in craters was examined by the suite of instruments on the Rover. Bedrock rocks were found to be sedimentary rocks with a high concentration of sulfur in the form of calcium and magnesium sulfates. Some of the sulfates that may be present in bedrocks are kieserite, sulfate anhydrate, bassanite, hexahydrite, epsomite, and gypsum. Salts, such as halite, bischofite, antarcticite, blödite, vanthoffite, or glauberite may also be present.

The rocks contained the sulfates had a light tone compared to isolated rocks and rocks examined by landers/rovers at other locations on Mars. The spectra of these light toned rocks, containing hydrated sulfates, were similar to spectra taken by the Thermal Emission Spectrometer on board the Mars Global Surveyor. The same spectrum is found over a large area, so it is believed that water once appeared over a wide region, not just in the area explored by Opportunity.

The Alpha particle X-ray spectrometer (APXS) found rather high levels of phosphorus in the rocks. Similar high levels were found by other rovers at Ares Vallis and Gusev crater, so it has been hypothesized that the mantle of Mars may be phosphorus-rich. The minerals in the rocks could have originated by acid weathering of basalt. Because the solubility of phosphorus is related to the solubility of uranium, thorium, and rare-earth elements, they are all also expected to be enriched in rocks.

When Opportunity traveled to the rim of the impact crater Endeavour, it found a white vein that was later identified as being pure gypsum. It was formed when water was discovered to harbor a then-unknown gypsum formation, at the time dubbed "Homestake," deposited the mineral into a crack in the rock.

=== Evidence for water ===
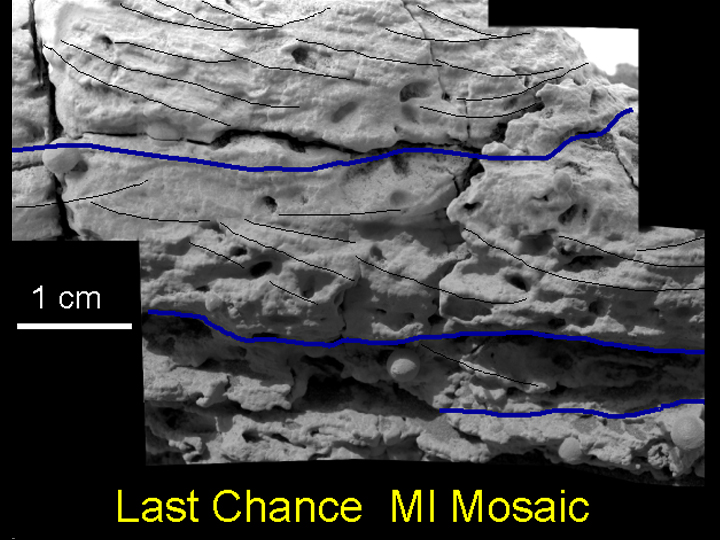
Cross-bedding features in rock "Last Chance"

Examination of bedrocks in Sinus Meridiani showed evidence of the mineral jarosite, which forms only in water. This discovery proved that water once existed in Sinus Meridiani In addition, some rocks showed small laminations with shapes only created by gently flowing water. The first such laminations were found in a rock called "The Dells." Geologists would say that the cross-stratification showed festoon geometry from transport in subaqueous ripples.

Box-shaped holes in some rocks were caused by sulfates forming large crystals, and then when the crystals later dissolved, holes, called vugs, were left behind. The concentration of the element bromine in rocks was highly variable probably because it is very soluble. Water may have concentrated it in places before it evaporated. Another mechanism for concentrating highly soluble bromine compounds is frost deposition, which, at night, would form very thin films of water that would concentrate bromine in certain spots.

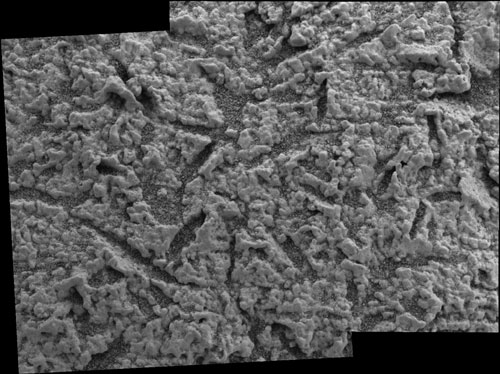
Voids, or "vugs," inside the rock

=== Rock from impact ===
One rock, dubbed "Bounce Rock," was discovered sitting on the sandy plains. It was later found to be ejecta from an impact crater, known as tektites. Its chemistry was different from the bedrock's. Containing mostly pyroxene and plagioclase with no olivine, it closely resembled a part, Lithology B, of the shergottite meteorite EETA 79001, a meteorite known to have come from Mars. Bounce rock received its name by being near an airbag bounce mark.

=== Meteorites ===
Opportunity found multiple meteorites on the plains of Sinus Meridiani. The first one analyzed with Opportunity's instruments was named "Heatshield Rock," as it was found near where Opportunity's headshield landed. Examination with the Miniature Thermal Emission Spectrometer (Mini-TES), Mossbauer spectrometer, and APXS, lead researchers to classify it as an IAB meteorite. The APXS determined it was composed of 93% iron and 7% nickel. The cobble named "Fig Tree Barberton" is thought to be a stony or stony-iron meteorite (mesosiderite silicate), while "Allan Hills" and "Zhong Shan" may be iron meteorites.

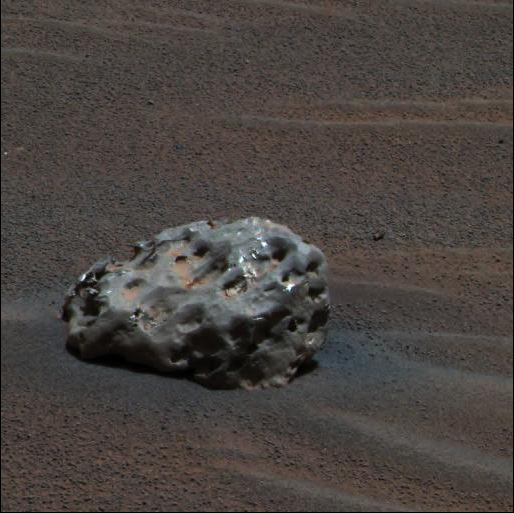
Heat Shield Rock was the first meteorite ever identified on another planet.

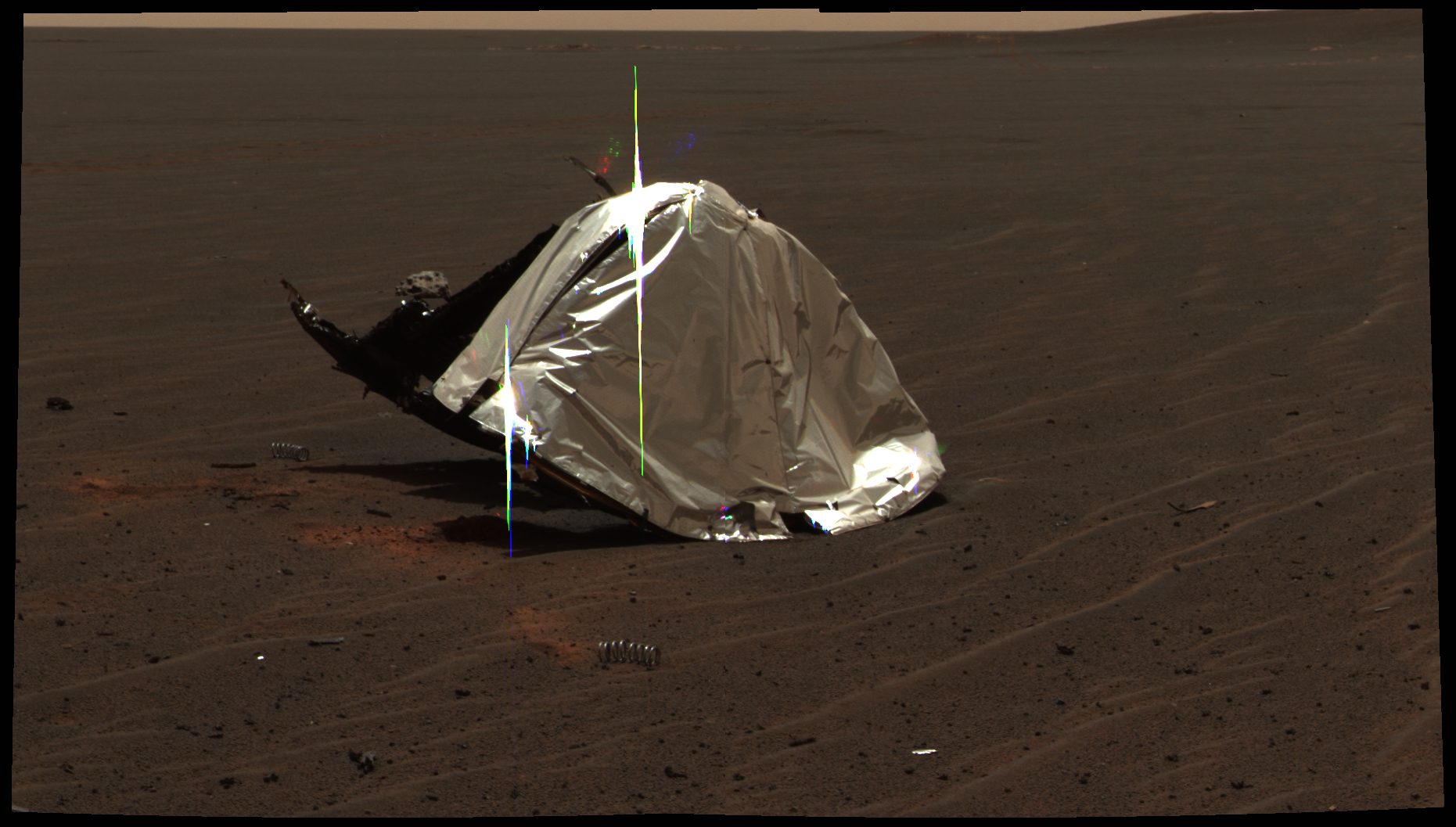
Heat shield, with Heat Shield Rock just above and to the left in the background.

=== Geological history ===
Observations at the site have led scientists to believe that the area was flooded with water a number of times and was subjected to evaporation and desiccation. In the process, sulfates were deposited. After sulfates cemented the sediments, hematite concretions grew by precipitation from groundwater. Some sulfates formed into large crystals, which later dissolved to leave vugs. Several lines of evidence point toward an arid climate in the past billion years or so, but a climate supporting water, at least for a time, in the distant past.

== Gallery ==
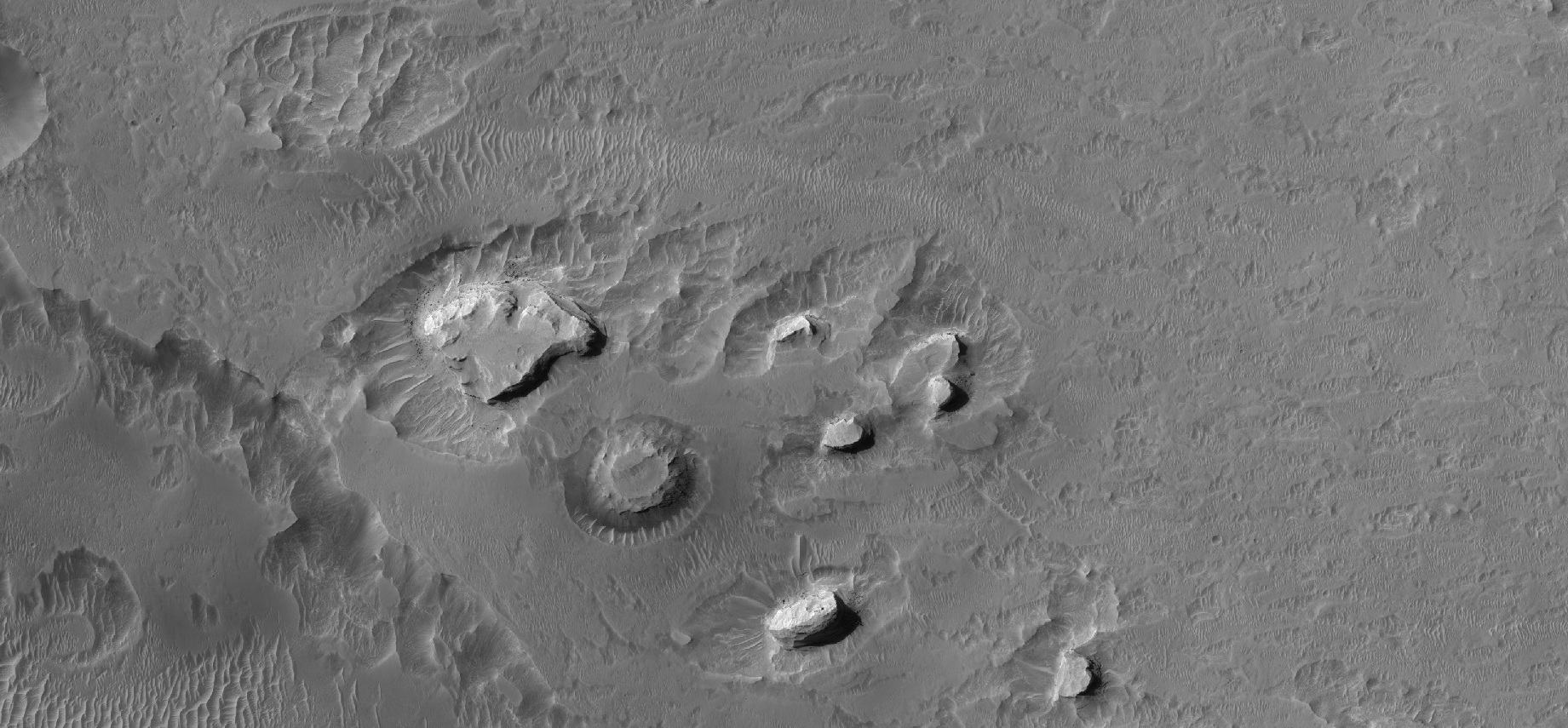
Layered mesas in Sinus Meridiani. Taken by HiRISE under the HiWish program.

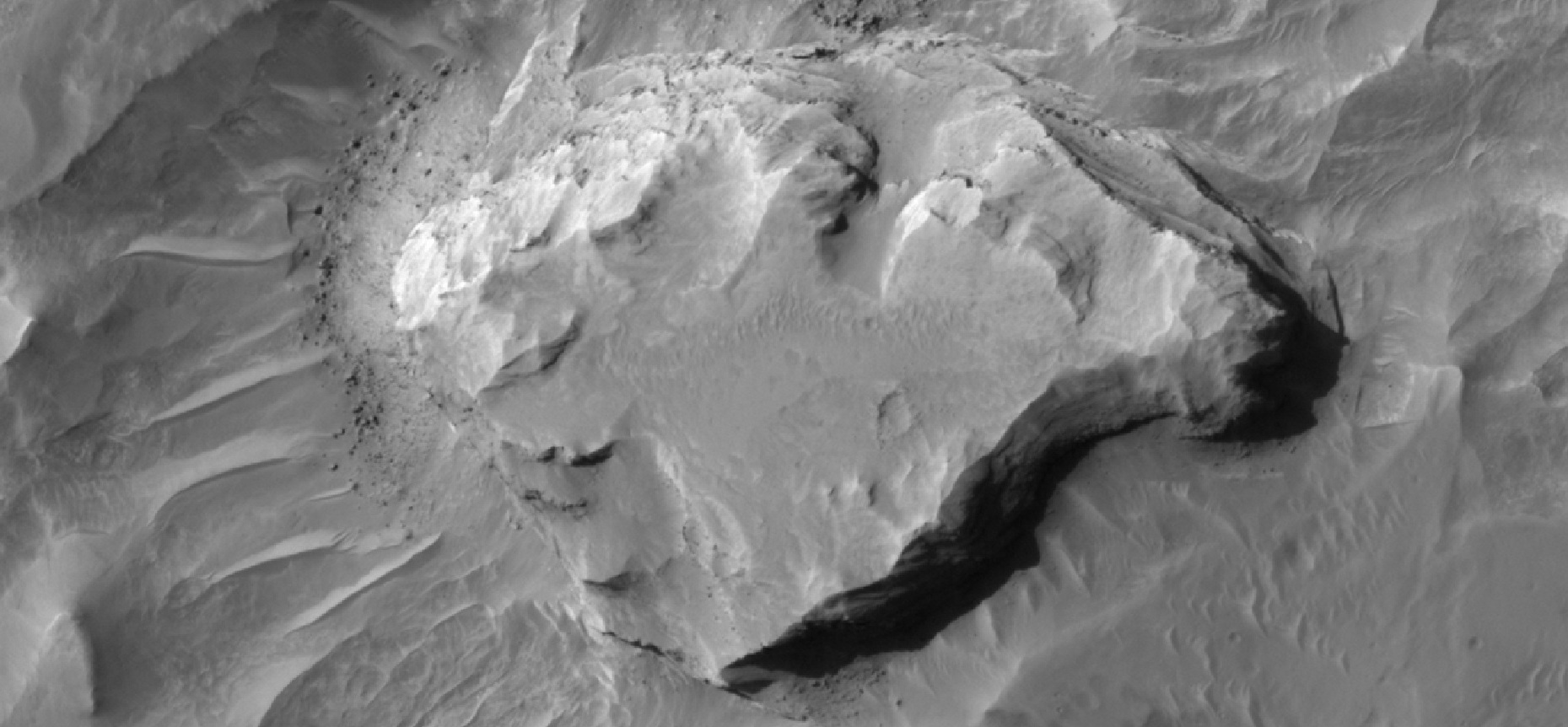
Close-up of one of mesas in previous photo showing layers. Mesa may be the remains of a lake in which sediments were deposited. Taken by HiRISE under the HiWish program.

== See also ==
- Geography of Mars
- Mars Exploration Rover
