= Eagle (crater) =

Crater on Mars

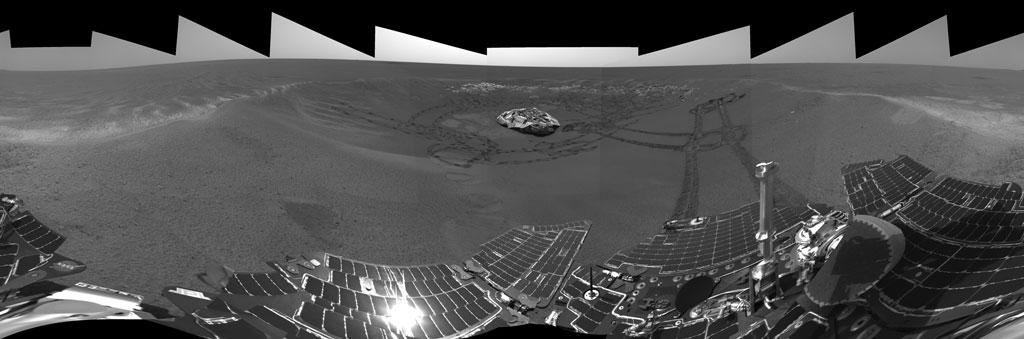
- Location: Meridiani Planum, Mars
- Coordinates: 1.95°S 354.47°E
- Diameter: 22 m
- Depth: 3 m
- Discoverer: Opportunity rover
- Eponym: See list below

Eagle is a 22-metre long impact crater located on the Meridiani Planum extraterrestrial plain, situated within the Margaritifer Sinus quadrangle (MC-19) portion of the planet Mars. The Opportunity rover came to rest inside Eagle crater when it landed in 2004. Scientists were delighted that the rover landed there, as the crater contains rocky outcroppings that helped prove that Meridiani was once an ocean floor.

This crater should not be confused with the other, much larger Martian crater Eagle, which was officially named by IAU's Working Group for Planetary System Nomenclature in 1976.

== Name ==
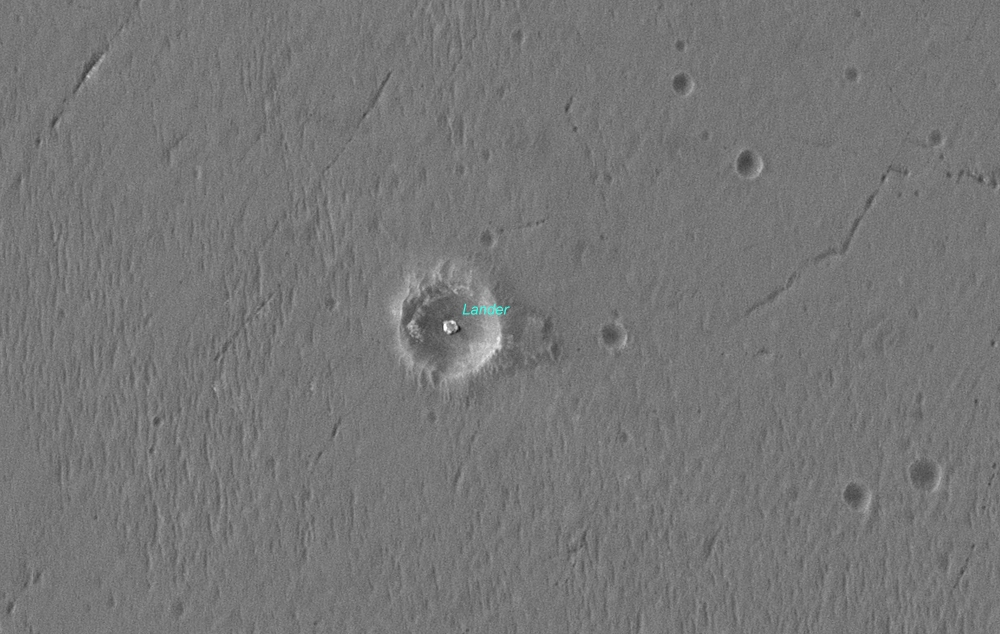
HiRISE image of the Martian crater Eagle – the dot in the middle of the crater is the lander.

The name is a triple reference: in honor of the first crewed spacecraft to land on the Moon in 1969; in honor of the launching country, the United States, whose symbol is an eagle; and in reference to the golf term eagle, referring to sinking a ball two strokes under par. The third reference extended the golf metaphor begun with a description of landing in the crater as "a hole in one".

== Discoveries in the crater ==
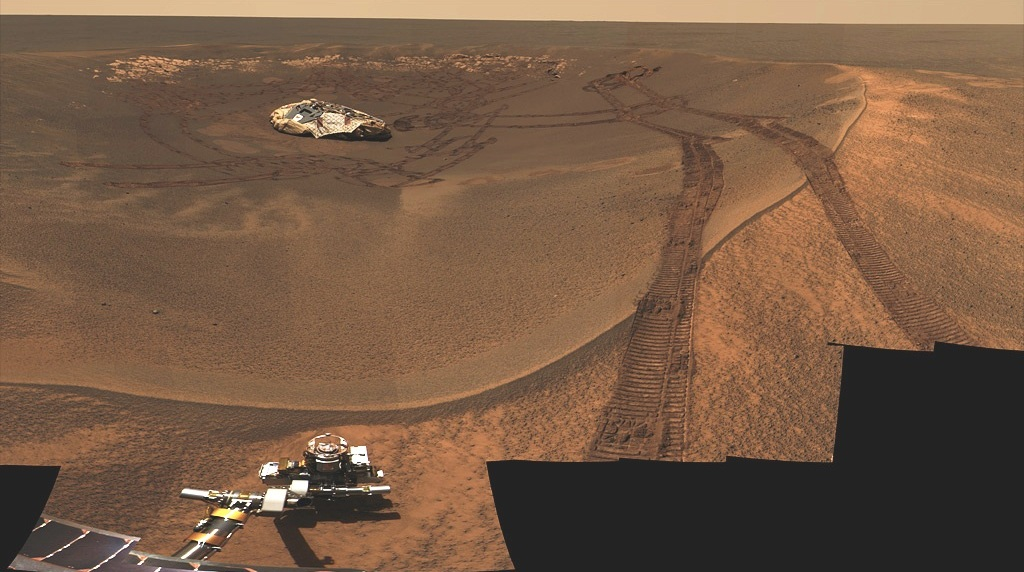
The crater, with Opportunity lander, as seen by Opportunity rover.

Mission scientists were intrigued by the abundance of rock outcrops dispersed throughout the crater, as well as the crater's soil, which appeared to be a mixture of coarse gray grains and fine reddish grains. Upon closer, in-situ examination of the outcrops, whose layers are no thicker than a finger, it was confirmed that Meridiani Planum was once the location of an ancient, somewhat acidic and salty sea, though much more information on the history of this area would start being collected more than three months later, when Opportunity visited the much larger crater Endurance to the east.

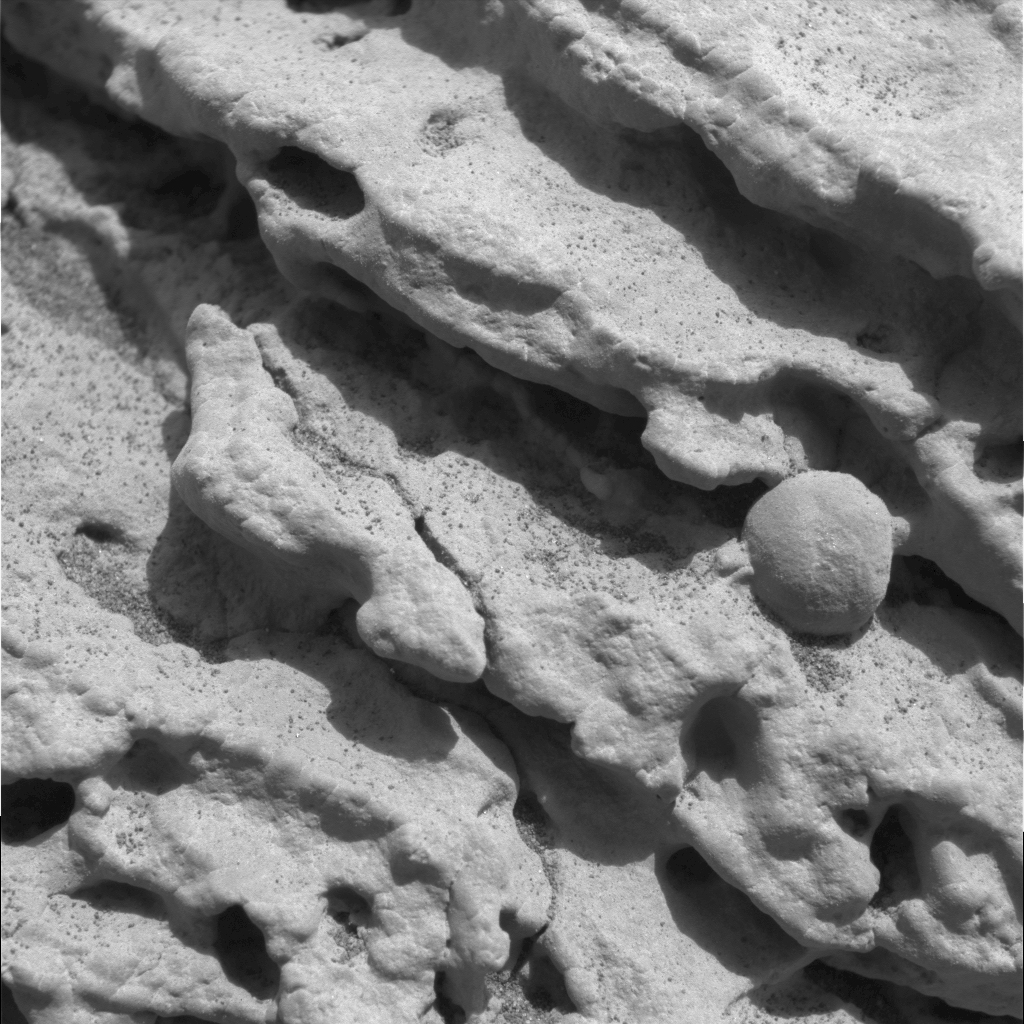
Spherules still in their originating strata.

The hematite observed from orbit, whose presence decided the landing site in the first place, was found to be encased in millions of tiny hematite spherules, nicknamed "blueberries", by mission scientists, due to their shape, although they are actually much smaller than real blueberries. These concretions were found soon to be covering not just the outcrops in Eagle crater, but covered the plains beyond as well. The origin of the blueberries was quickly discovered. They appeared to be being eroded out of the outcrops by wind. Images from the rover's microscope discovered blueberries at several stages of this process, with most completely separated, but some still attached by a thin "stalk".

== Rocks and outcrops in the crater ==
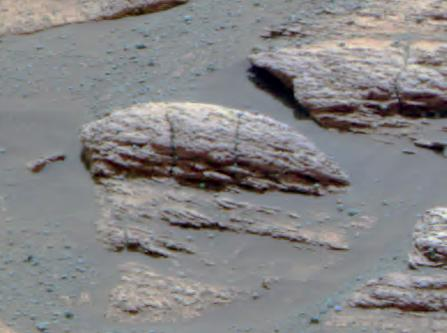
Approximate true-color photo of Last Chance.

A number of rocks and outcrops were investigated with Opportunity's Instrument Deployment Device (IDD). They were given informal names by mission scientists. These include:

- Berry Bowl, an outcrop rich in Martian spherules
- Carousel, a layered outcrop most likely to have been formed in a wet environment
- Cookies 'N' Cream, a dark soil target near Carousel
- El Capitan, another layered outcrop
- Last Chance, another layered outcrop

The locations of these rocks and outcrops can be seen in the panorama below:

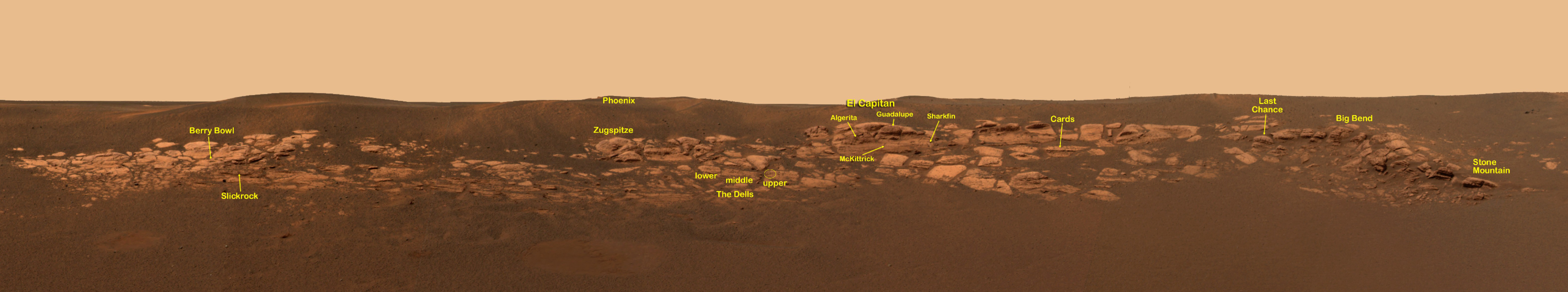
This panoramic image, showing the locations of rocks and outcrops at the northwestern rim of Eagle crater, was taken with Opportunity still on its lander. These layered rocks measure only 10 centimeters (4 inches) tall and were thought at that time to be either volcanic ash deposits or sediments carried by water or wind. Click here for a version of this image without annotations. (Courtesy NASA/JPL-Caltech)

== See also ==
- Geography of Mars
- List of craters on Mars
