= Victoria (crater) =

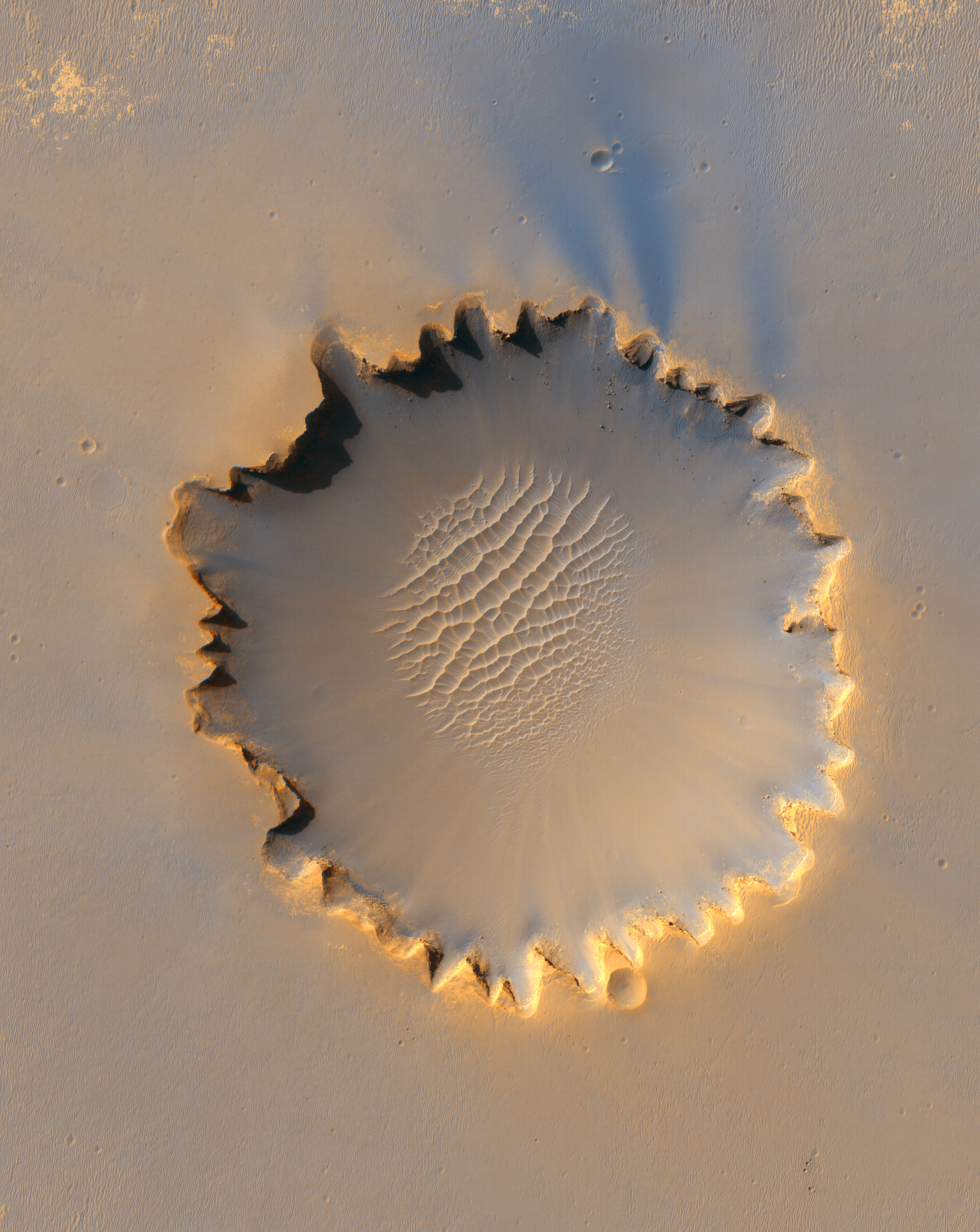
- Mars Reconnaissance Orbiter (MRO) HiRISE image of Victoria on October 3, 2006. Light is from the top left.
- Planet: Mars
- Region: Meridiani Planum
- Coordinates: 2.05°S 5.50°W
- Quadrangle: Margaritifer Sinus
- Diameter: 800 m (2,600 ft)
- Depth: Approx. 70 m (230 ft)
- Discoverer: Opportunity rover
- Eponym: The ship Victoria and Victoria, Seychelles

Victoria is an impact crater on Mars located at 2.05°S, 5.50°W in the Meridiani Planum extraterrestrial plain, lying situated within the Margaritifer Sinus quadrangle (MC-19) region of the planet Mars. This crater was first visited by the Mars Exploration Rover Opportunity. It is roughly 800 metres (2,600 ft) wide, nearly eight times the size of the crater Endurance, visited by Opportunity from sols 951 to 1630. This makes it about two-thirds the size of the 1,200-meter-wide Meteor Crater on Earth, a popular tourist attraction in Winslow, Arizona.

It is informally named after Victoria – one of the five Spanish ships of Ferdinand Magellan and the first ship to circumnavigate the globe – and formally named after Victoria, Seychelles. Along the edges of the crater are many outcrops within recessed alcoves and promontories, named for bays and capes that Magellan discovered.

Opportunity traveled for 21 months to Victoria before finally reaching its edge on September 26, 2006 (sol 951), at the newly named "Duck Bay". Around the rover were features dubbed "No Name", "Duck Crater", "Emma Dean", "Maid of the Canyon", and "Kitty Clyde's Sister". It also imaged several nearby alcoves, informally named "Cape Verde" and "Cabo Frio", and a small bright crater the size of Beagle on the opposite end of Victoria.

== Exploration ==
After arrival at the crater, the rover undertook a partial clockwise circumnavigation. The trip took approximately a quarter of the way around the crater. The various "bays" and "capes" were named after various landmarks visited by Ferdinand Magellan aboard the ship Victoria.

The circumnavigation allowed rover drivers to identify possible entry and exit points, create a high resolution topographical map of the crater and test out upgraded drive software. The rover investigated the layering on the walls of the various capes and the nature of the dark streaks to the north of the crater.

=== Interior ===
After a planet-wide dust storm that delayed entry into the crater for six weeks and threatened the survival of both rovers, the rover entered the crater at a point in Duck Bay. This was preceded by a test maneuver on sol 1291 to determine slippage and confirm exit strategies, followed by entry on sol 1293. During the rover's stay inside the crater, data were collected from rock layers inside the crater and high-resolution imagery was obtained of Cape Verde.

The rover left the crater interior on sol 1634 (August 29, 2008) after it experienced a current spike similar to the one which preceded the malfunction of twin Spirit's right front wheel. After a partial anti-clockwise circumnavigation, the rover set off toward its next major destination, the crater Endeavour.

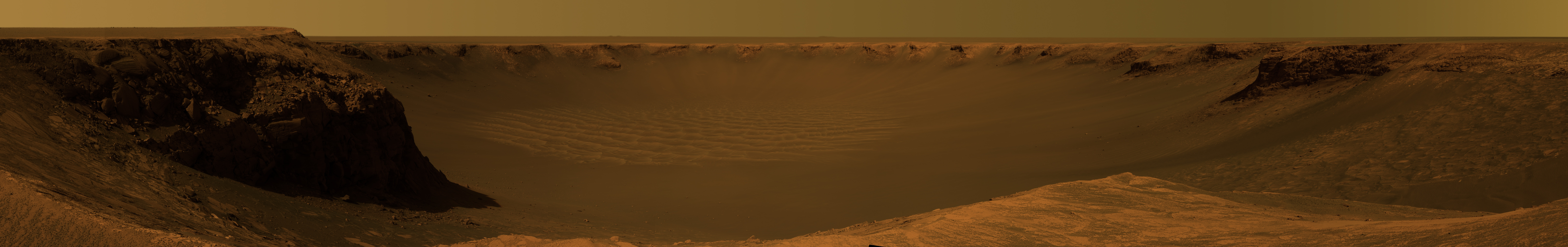
Victoria Crater as seen by the NASA rover Opportunity (MER-B) in 2006 using its "Pancam" (panoramic camera) instrument

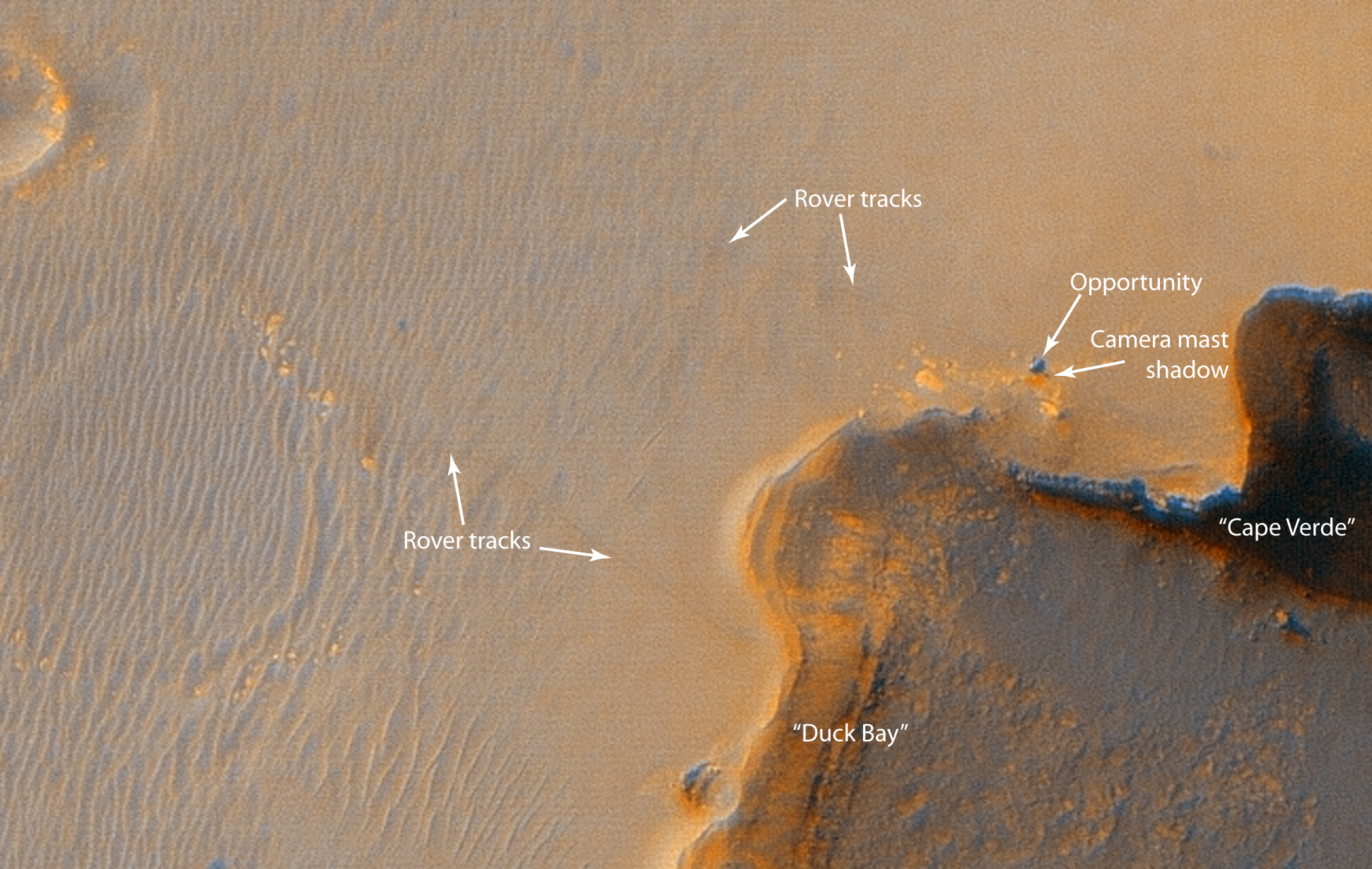
The Mars Exploration Rover Opportunity at the rim of Victoria crater as photographed from the Mars Reconnaissance Orbiter's HiRISE camera.

== Context map ==
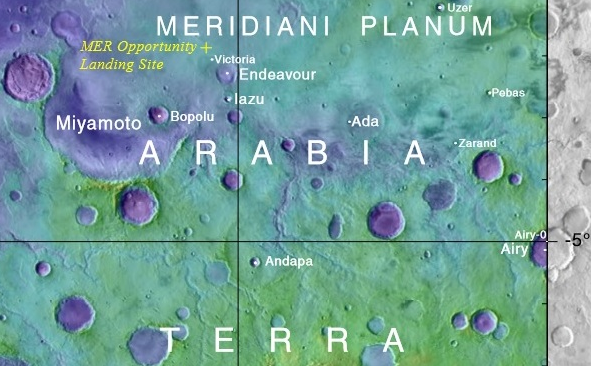
Annotated elevation map of Opportunity landing site and some surrounding craters including Endeavour and Airy

== See also ==
- Geography of Mars
- List of craters on Mars
- Endeavour (crater)
