= Endurance (crater) =

Crater on Mars

Martian crater Endurance
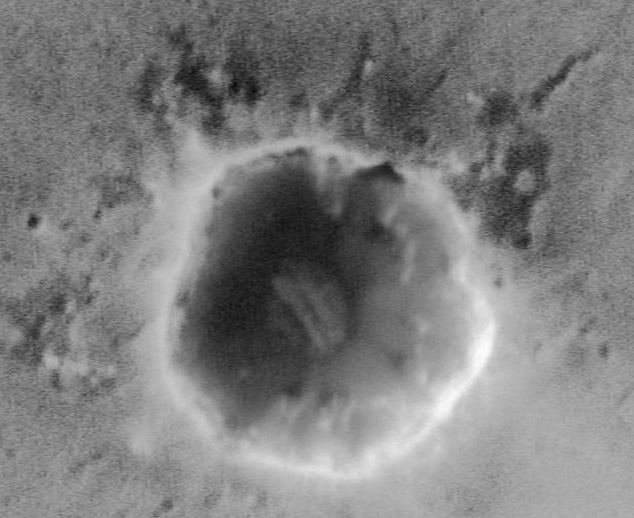
- View of Endurance from orbit.
- Planet: Mars
- Region: Meridiani Planum
- Coordinates: 1.9°S 354.5°E
- Quadrangle: Margaritifer Sinus
- Diameter: 130 m
- Depth: Approx. 20 m (66 ft)
- Discoverer: Opportunity rover
- Eponym: The ship Endurance

Endurance is an impact crater lying situated within the Margaritifer Sinus quadrangle (MC-19) region of the planet Mars. This crater was visited by the Opportunity rover from May until December 2004. Mission scientists named the crater after the ship Endurance that sailed to the Antarctic through the Weddell Sea during the ill-fated 1914–1917 Imperial Trans-Antarctic Expedition, considered to be the last expedition of the Heroic Age of Antarctic Exploration organized by Ernest Shackleton.

The rover entered the crater interior on its 134th mission sol (June 15), and exited on the 315th sol (December 14). During this time it traversed various obstacles, steep inclines, and overcame large wheel slippage when driving over fine sand.

== Exploration by Opportunity ==
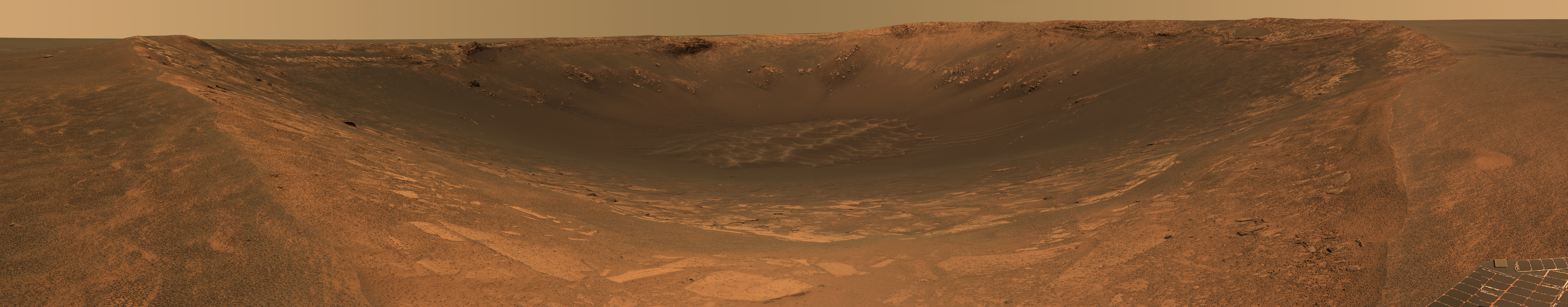
Panoramic image showing Endurance crater – it was taken shortly after the arrival of the Opportunity rover at the rim of the crater.

After arriving at the crater, Opportunity performed a survey of the crater to plan the further steps in exploring the local geology. A site dubbed "Karatepe" was chosen to enter the crater and investigate the layering of the bedrock.

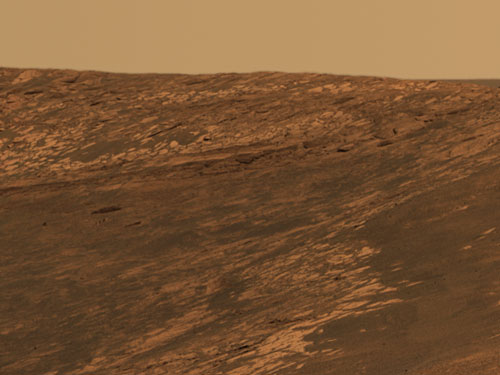
Approximate true-color image of Karatepe.

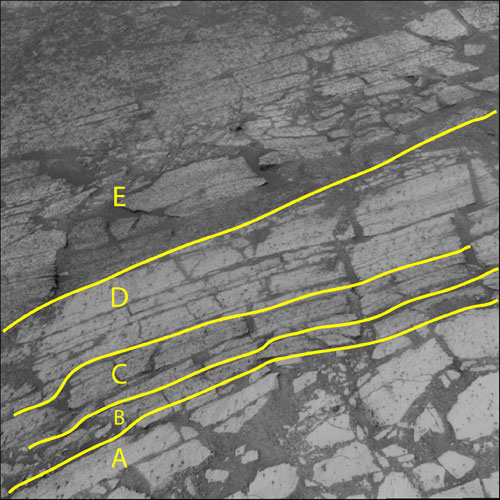
Layers present at Karatepe.

The picture to the right shows changes in the color of the bedrock layers. The layer "A" is closer to the rover and higher than the layers "B" to "E". Texture and rock chemistry also differed with depth. Thus scientists infer that the age of these layers is following a similar pattern, with the higher layers being younger than the lower layers.

Opportunity then went farther down into the crater to investigate the sand dunes. Various rock outcrops were investigated while the rover descended. It was decided not to drive into the dunes, for fear the rover might get stuck permanently. Instead, Opportunity did some work on some rocks surrounding the dunes before heading back up to the rim of the crater. On the way, it encountered a boulder, nicknamed 'Wopmay', that provided inconclusive evidence that rocks near the bottom of the crater were affected by water before and after the crater formed.

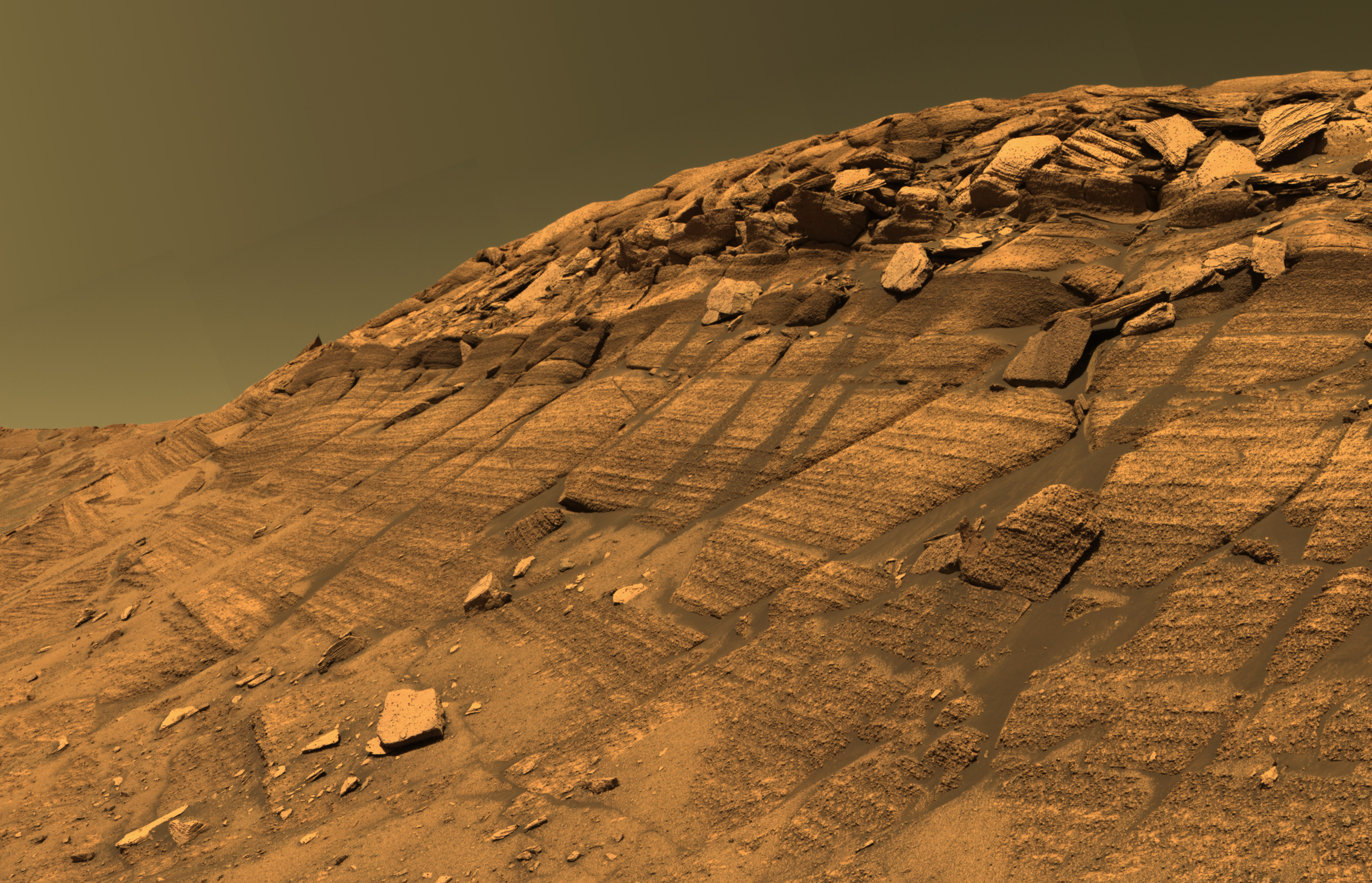
The view of Burns Cliff inside Endurance

The rover then headed off to Burns Cliff. Burns Cliff, named for the late mineralogist Roger Burns of MIT, was studied closely by Opportunity. High amounts of slippage prevented the rover from using its robotic arm, however high resolution imaging was conducted with the Pancam. It shows layers of sediment that might indicate deposition by a liquid. The layers in the cliff would later be followed south of the crater to identify it as a geologic formation, in this case the "Burns Formation". These names are not official until made so by the International Astronomical Union.

Burns Cliff was the final science stop inside Endurance. The rover had some trouble making it out, noticing slippage, but prevailed. Leaving Endurance it headed for its heat shield where it would find the Meridiani Planum meteorite, which happened to be the first meteorite discovered on another planet.

== Wet history ==
Opportunity spent about half a year exploring Endurance. During that time, data collected by the rover supplanted and greatly expanded on the history of water at Meridiani Planum, in addition to the confirmation that there had been liquid water here in ancient times. Endurance provided mission scientists with a cross-section of the bedrock on this part of Mars, showing that liquid water hadn't flowed across the surface just once, but was of an episodic nature, and wasn't permanently present, with floods periodically washing over the landscape, and then drying up again. Interpretation of the materials (such as sulfates) in Endurance's evaporite outcrops led mission scientists to believe that this shallow sea was probably rather acidic in nature, but couldn't rule out that life may have been present at some point.

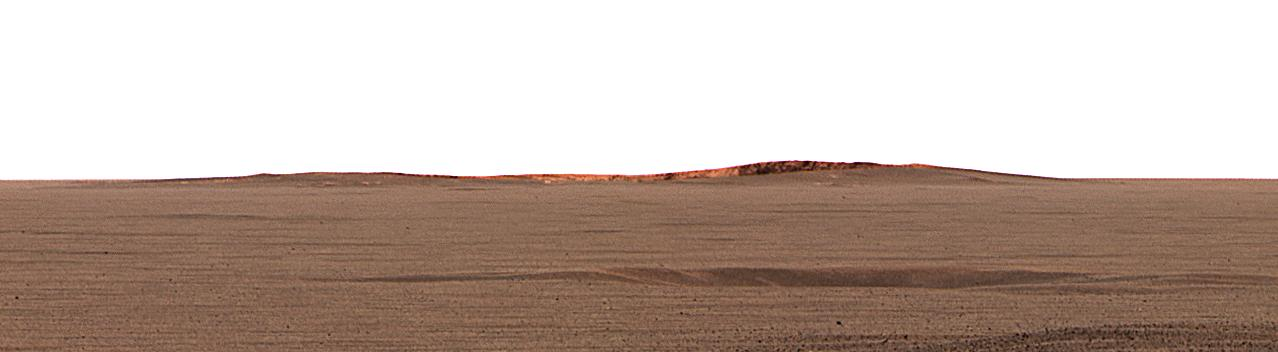
The rim of Endurance in the distance, as seen from the landing site of Opportunity, Eagle crater

== See also ==
- Exploration of Mars
- Geography of Mars
- List of craters on Mars
- Opportunity mission timeline
