= Thermal Emission Spectrometer =

Instrument on board Mars Global Surveyor

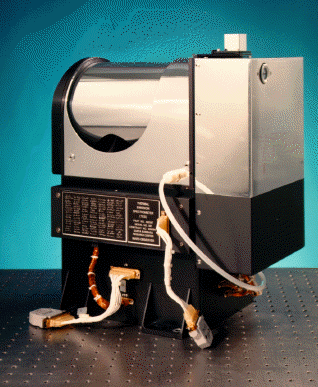
Mars Global Surveyor's Thermal Emission Spectrometer

The Thermal Emission Spectrometer (TES) was an instrument on board Mars Global Surveyor. TES collected two types of data, hyperspectral thermal infrared data from 6 to 50 micrometres (μm) and bolometric visible-near infrared (0.3 to 2.9 μm) measurements. TES had six detectors arranged in a 2×3 array, and each detector had a field of view of approximately 3 × 6 km on the surface of Mars.

The TES instrument used the natural harmonic vibrations of the chemical bonds in materials to determine the composition of gases, liquids, and solids.

TES identified a large (30,000 square-kilometer) area that contained the mineral olivine. Olivine was found in the Nili Fossae formation. It is thought that the ancient impact that created the Isidis basin resulted in faults that exposed the olivine. Olivine is present in many mafic volcanic rocks. In the presence of water it weathers into minerals such as goethite, chlorite, smectite, maghemite, and hematite. Olivine was also discovered in many other small outcrops within 60 degrees north and south of the equator. Olivine has also been found in the SNC (shergottite, nakhlite, and chassigny) meteorites that are generally accepted to have come from Mars. Later studies found the olivine-rich rocks to cover over 113,000 square kilometers. That is 11 times larger than the five volcanoes on the Big Island of Hawaii.

== See also ==
- Thermal Emission Imaging System
- Thermal infrared spectroscopy
- Phil Christensen
