= Bowling Ball Beach =

Beach in Mendocino County, California, US

Coordinates: 38.87058°N 123.658159°W

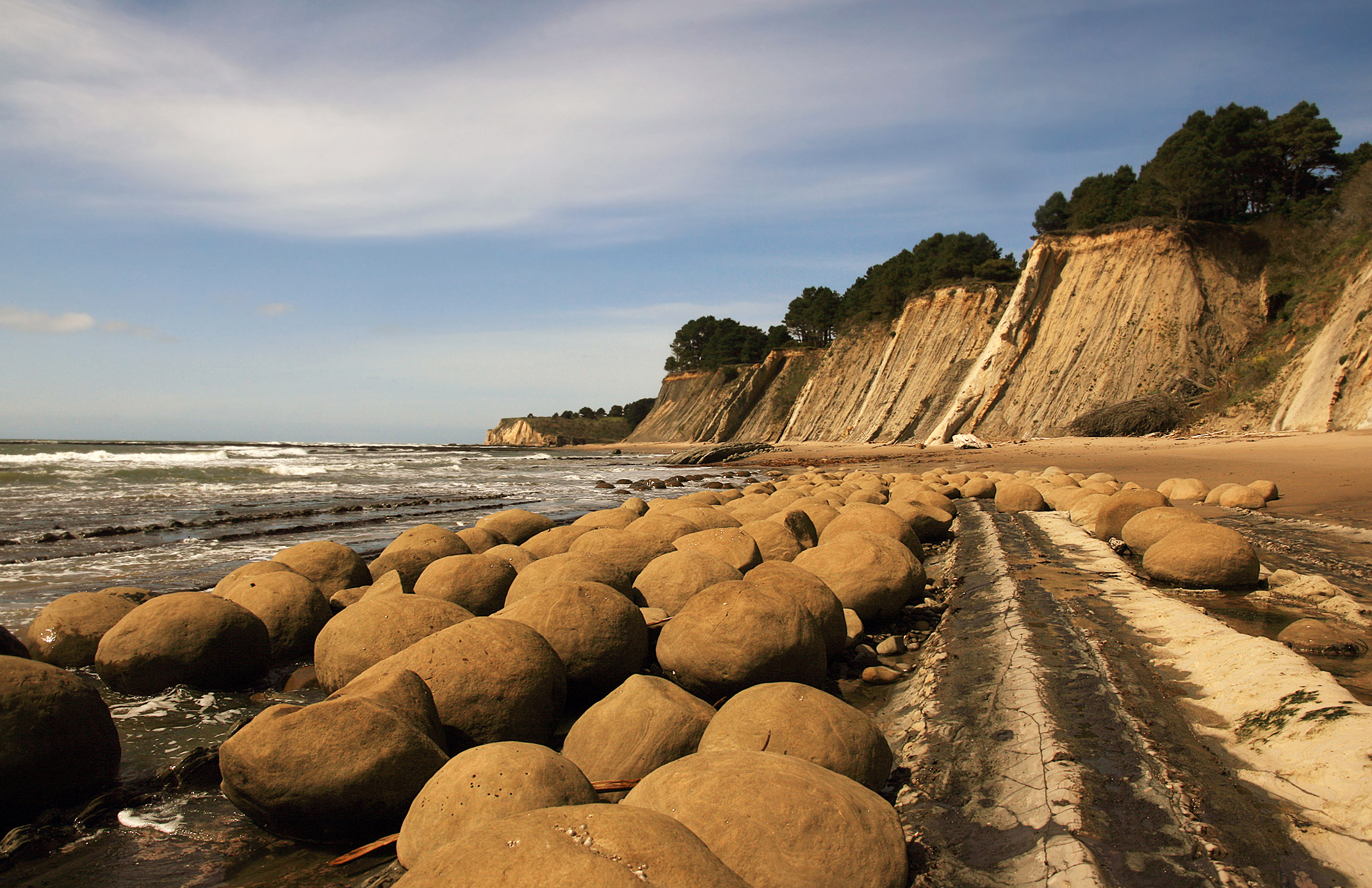
Concretions on Bowling Ball Beach, south of Point Arena, California

Bowling Ball Beach is a part of Schooner Gulch State Beach, in Mendocino County, California, in the United States. It is named for the spherical sandstone concretions found there at low tide.

== See also ==
- Caspar Headlands State Beach – California State Beach
- Glass Beach (Fort Bragg, California) – Beach in northern California, USA
- Greenwood State Beach – State park in California, United States
- Moeraki Boulders – Large spherical boulders on Otago coast, New Zealand
