= Moeraki Boulders =

Large spherical boulders on Otago coast, New Zealand

Coordinates: 45°20′42.99″S 170°49′33.82″E

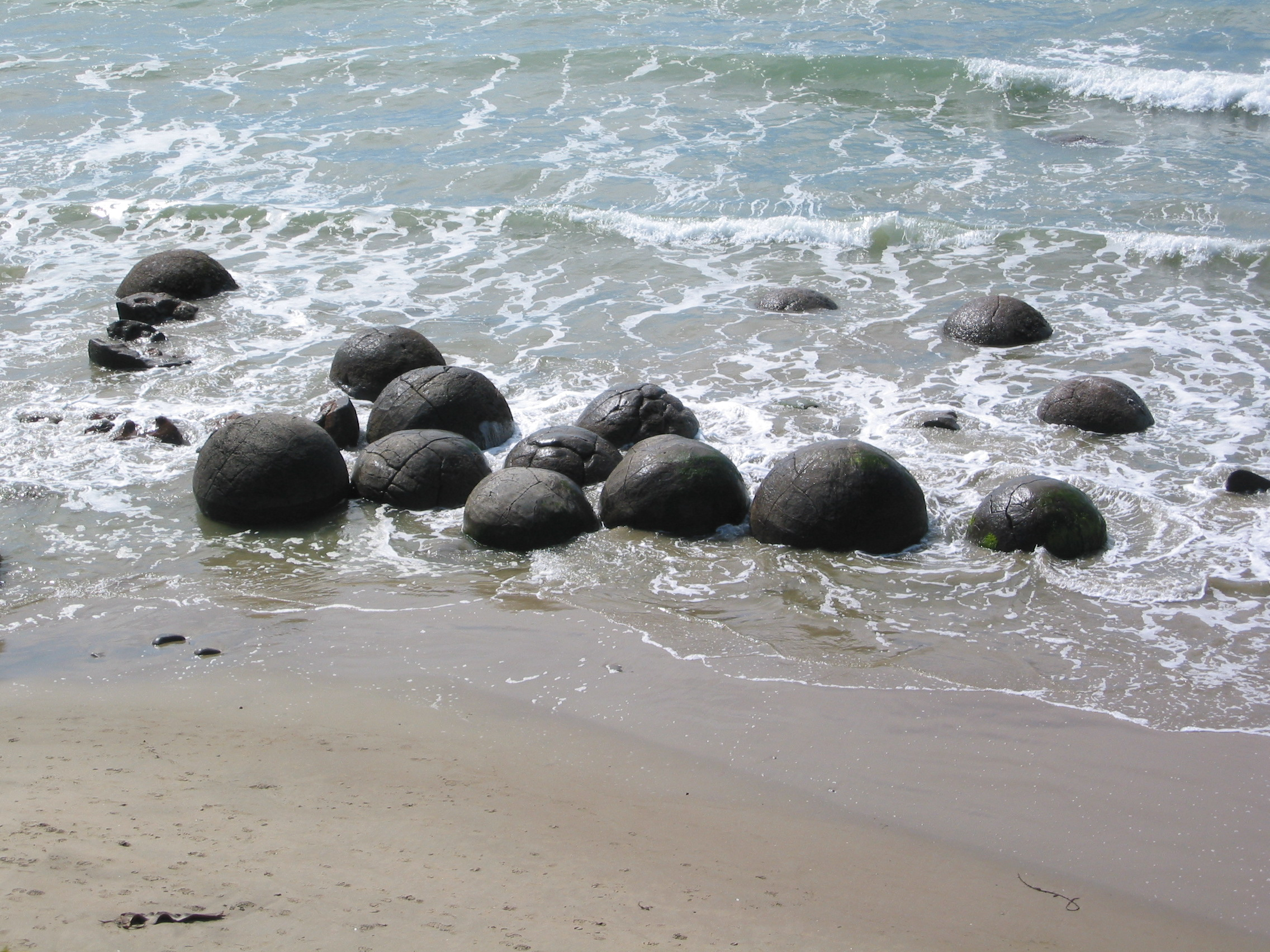
Boulders of varying sphericity broaching the Otago coast

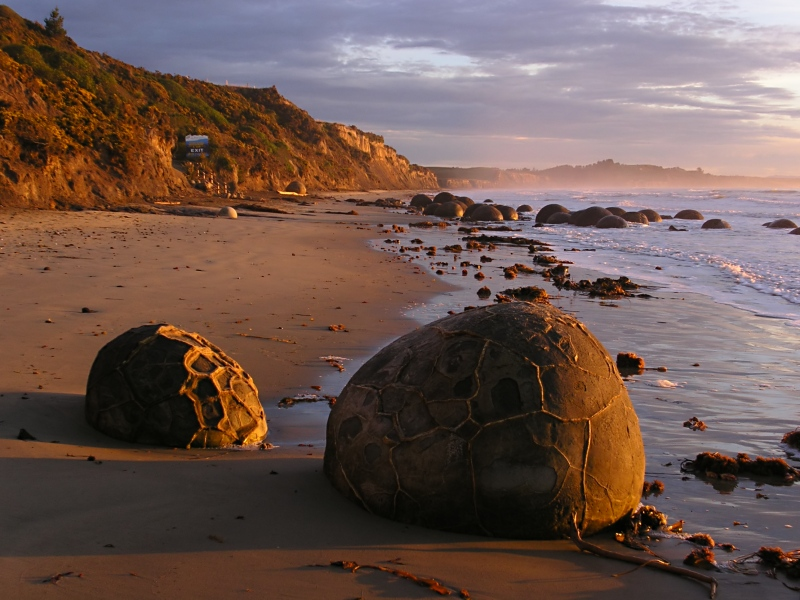
The boulders at sunrise

The Moeraki Boulders (officially Moeraki Boulders / Kaihinaki) are unusually large spherical boulders lying along a stretch of Koekohe Beach on the wave-cut Otago coast of New Zealand between Moeraki and Hampden. They occur scattered either as isolated or clusters of boulders within a stretch of beach where they have been protected in a scientific reserve. These boulders are grey-coloured septarian concretions, which have been exhumed from the mudstone and bedrock enclosing them and concentrated on the beach by coastal erosion. Especially in recent years, the boulders have been a popular tourist attraction.

== Description ==
The most striking aspect of the boulders is their unusually large size and spherical shape, with a distinct bimodal size distribution. Approximately one-third of the boulders range in size from about 0.5 to 1.0 metre (1.6 to 3.3 ft) in diameter, the other two-thirds from 1.5 to 2.2 metres (4.9 to 7.2 ft). Most are spherical or almost spherical, but a small proportion are slightly elongated parallel to the bedding plane of the mudstone that once enclosed them.

Neither the spherical to subspherical shape or large size of the Moeraki Boulders is unique to them. Virtually identical spherical boulders, called Koutu Boulders, are found on the beaches, in the cliffs, and beneath the surface inland of the shore of Hokianga Harbour, North Island, New Zealand, between Koutu and Kauwhare points. Like the Moeraki Boulders, the Koutu Boulders are large, reaching 3 metres (10 ft) in diameter, and almost spherical. Similar boulder-size concretions, known as Katiki Boulders, are also found on the north-facing shore of Shag Point some 19 kilometres (12 mi) south of where the Moeraki Boulders are found. These concretions occur as both spherical cannonball concretions and flat, disk-shaped or oval concretions. Unlike the Moeraki boulders, some of these concretions contain the bones of mosasaurs and plesiosaurs.

Similar large spherical concretions have been found in many other countries. Similar septarian concretions have been found in the Kimmeridge Clay and Oxford Clay of England, and at many other locations worldwide.

== Composition ==
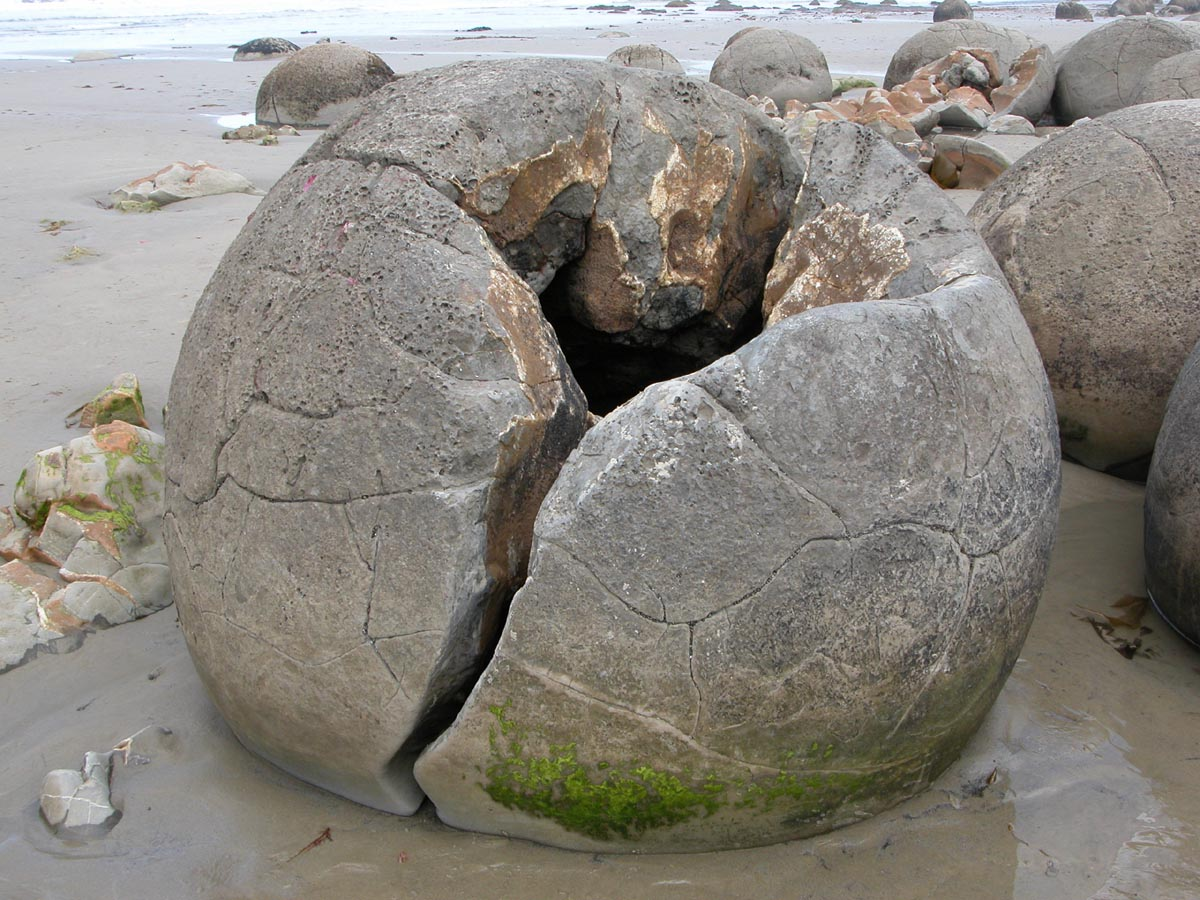
A cracked boulder displaying its hollow interior

Detailed analysis of the fine-grained rock using optical mineralogy, X-ray crystallography, and electron microprobe has determined that the boulders consist of mud, fine silt and clay, cemented by calcite. The degree of cementation varies from being relatively weak in the interior of a boulder to quite hard at its outside rim. The outside rims of the larger boulders consist of as much as 10 to 20% calcite because the calcite not only tightly cements the silt and clay but has also replaced it to a significant degree.

The rock comprising the bulk of a boulder is riddled with large cracks called septaria that radiate outward from a hollow core lined with scalenohedral calcite crystals. The process or processes that created septaria within Moeraki Boulders, and in other septarian concretions, remain an unresolved matter for which a number of possible explanations have been proposed. These cracks radiate and thin outward from the centre of the typical boulder and are typically filled with an outer (early stage) layer of brown calcite and an inner (late stage) layer of yellow calcite spar, which often, but not always, completely fills the cracks. Rare Moeraki Boulders have a very thin innermost (latest stage) layer of dolomite and quartz covering the yellow calcite spar.

The composition of the Moeraki Boulders and the septaria that they contain are typical of, often virtually identical to, septarian concretions that have been found in exposures of sedimentary rocks in New Zealand and elsewhere. Smaller but otherwise very similar septarian concretions are found within exposures of sedimentary rocks elsewhere in New Zealand. Similar septarian concretions have been found in the Kimmeridge Clay and Oxford Clay of England, and at many other locations worldwide.

== Origin ==
The Moeraki Boulders are concretions created by the cementation of the Paleocene mudstone of the Moeraki Formation, from which they have been exhumed by coastal erosion. The main body of the boulders started forming in what was then marine mud, near the surface of the Paleocene seafloor. This is demonstrated by studies of their composition; specifically the magnesium and iron content, and stable isotopes of oxygen and carbon. Their spherical shape indicates that the source of calcium was mass diffusion, as opposed to fluid flow. The larger boulders, 2 metres (6.6 ft) in diameter, are estimated to have taken 4 to 5.5 million years to grow while 10 to 50 metres (33 to 164 ft) of marine mud accumulated on the seafloor above them. After the concretions formed, large cracks known as septaria formed in them. Brown calcite, yellow calcite, and small amounts of dolomite and quartz progressively filled these cracks when a sea level drop allowed fresh groundwater to flow through the mudstone enclosing them.

== Documentation and oral tradition ==
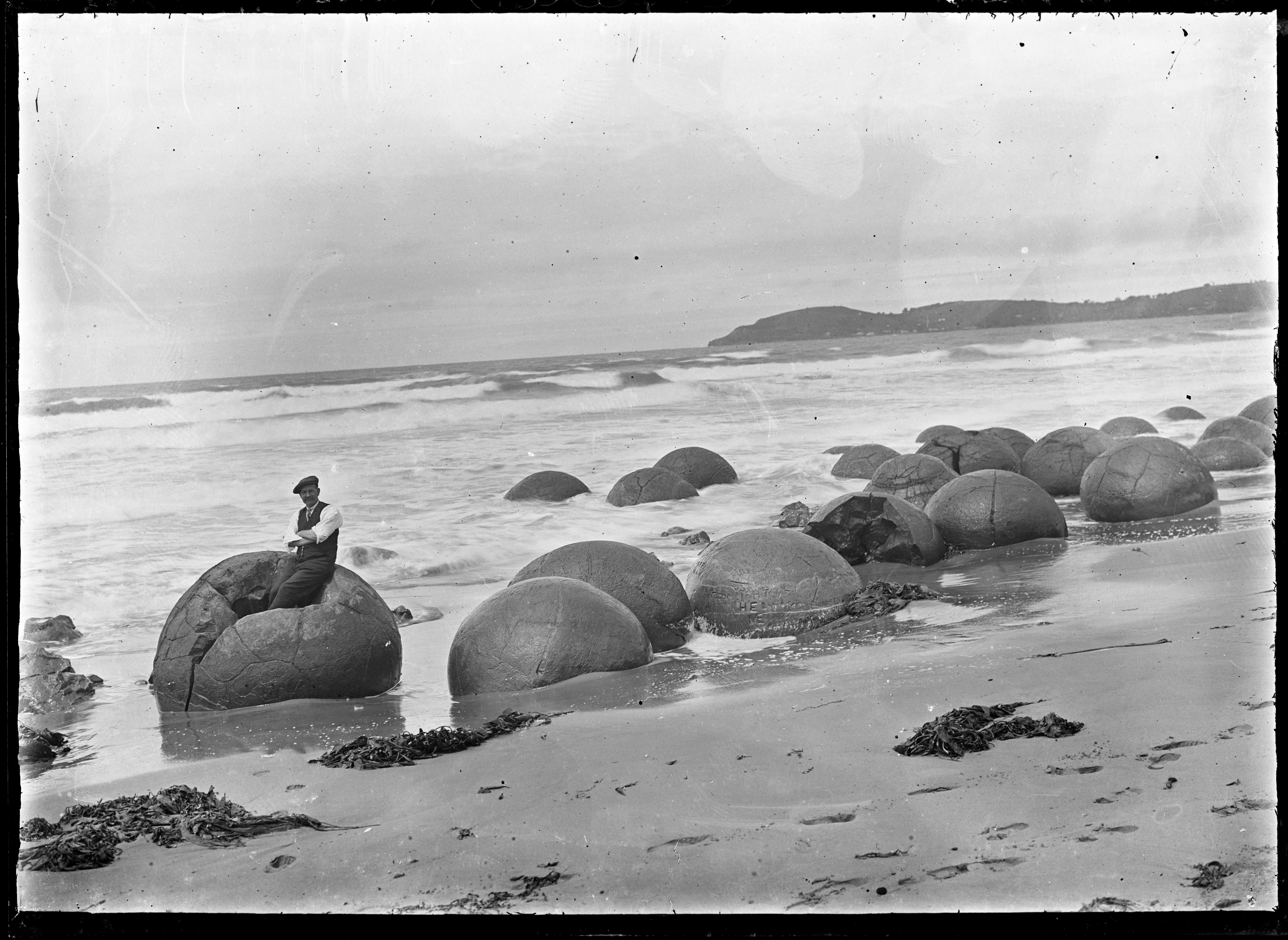
Albert Percy Godber portrait among the boulders (circa 1925)

Local Māori legends explained the boulders as the remains of eel baskets, calabashes, and kūmara washed ashore from the wreck of Āraiteuru, a large sailing canoe. This legend tells of the rocky shoals that extend seaward from Shag Point as being the petrified hull of this wreck and a nearby rocky promontory as being the body of the canoe's captain. Their reticulated patterning on the boulders, according to this legend, are the remains of the canoe's fishing nets.

In 1848, Walter Mantell sketched the beach and its boulders, more numerous than now. The picture is now in the Alexander Turnbull Library in Wellington.

== See also ==
- Bowling Ball Beach – Beach in Mendocino County, California, US
- Concretion – In geology, a type of compact mass
- List of rock formations of New Zealand
- Martian spherules – Small iron oxide spherules found on Mars
- Moqui Marbles – Geologic formation in the southwestern United States
- Rock City, Kansas – Park in Kansas, U.S.
- Stone spheres of Costa Rica – National symbol of Costa Rica
