= Dinocochlea =

Trace fossil

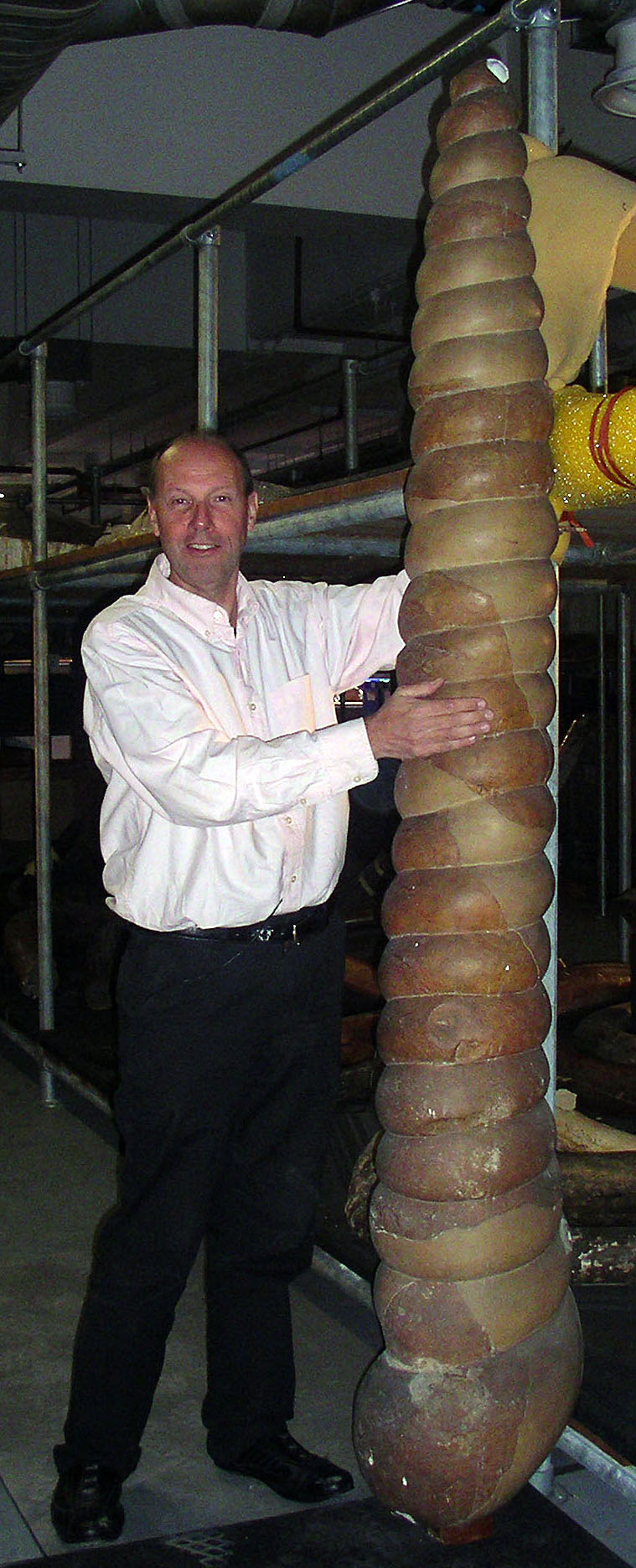
A model of Dinocochlea with Natural History Museum research scientist Paul Taylor as a scale.

Dinocochlea ingens is a trace fossil specimen held in the Natural History Museum of London. It is a symmetrical helicospiral several metres in length that was famously unexplained until shown in 2009 to be a concretion formed around the burrow of a worm.

== History ==
Found in 1921 in the Wealden area of Sussex in England during construction of an arterial road, Dinocochlea was originally presumed to be a fossilised gastropod shell. As such, it was given a Latin name that translates to "giant terrible snail" using the "dino-" prefix in a nod to Dinosaur ("terrible lizard") and refers to the nearby, paleontologically significant, quarry that featured many dinosaur fossils, the "Iguanodon Necropolis". This name also gave rise to a second theory on the origin of the object - that it is a coprolite (fossilized animal dung). The gastropod theory is now considered incorrect on the basis that there were no shell traces, nor many of the features usually found in gastropod shells such as ridges, and coils tapering to a point. Furthermore, the size of Dinocochlea is much larger than any other gastropod living or extinct. The coprolite theory is also considered incorrect on the basis that partially digested organic material which would normally remain in the dung was not present. Also, whilst dung can be formed in a spiral (notably sharks due to their digestive system's spiral valve), the consistency of Dinocochlea makes this unlikely.

Dinocochlea was donated to the British Museum (Natural History) (as it was known at the time, until the Natural History Museum's separation from the British Museum). However, in 1947 the Geologists' Association argued that the specimen was "...taken from the excavations without permission". Dinocochlea was featured in the final episode of the 2010 BBC series Museum of Life which documented the work of the Natural History Museum.
