= Concretion =

In geology, a type of compact mass

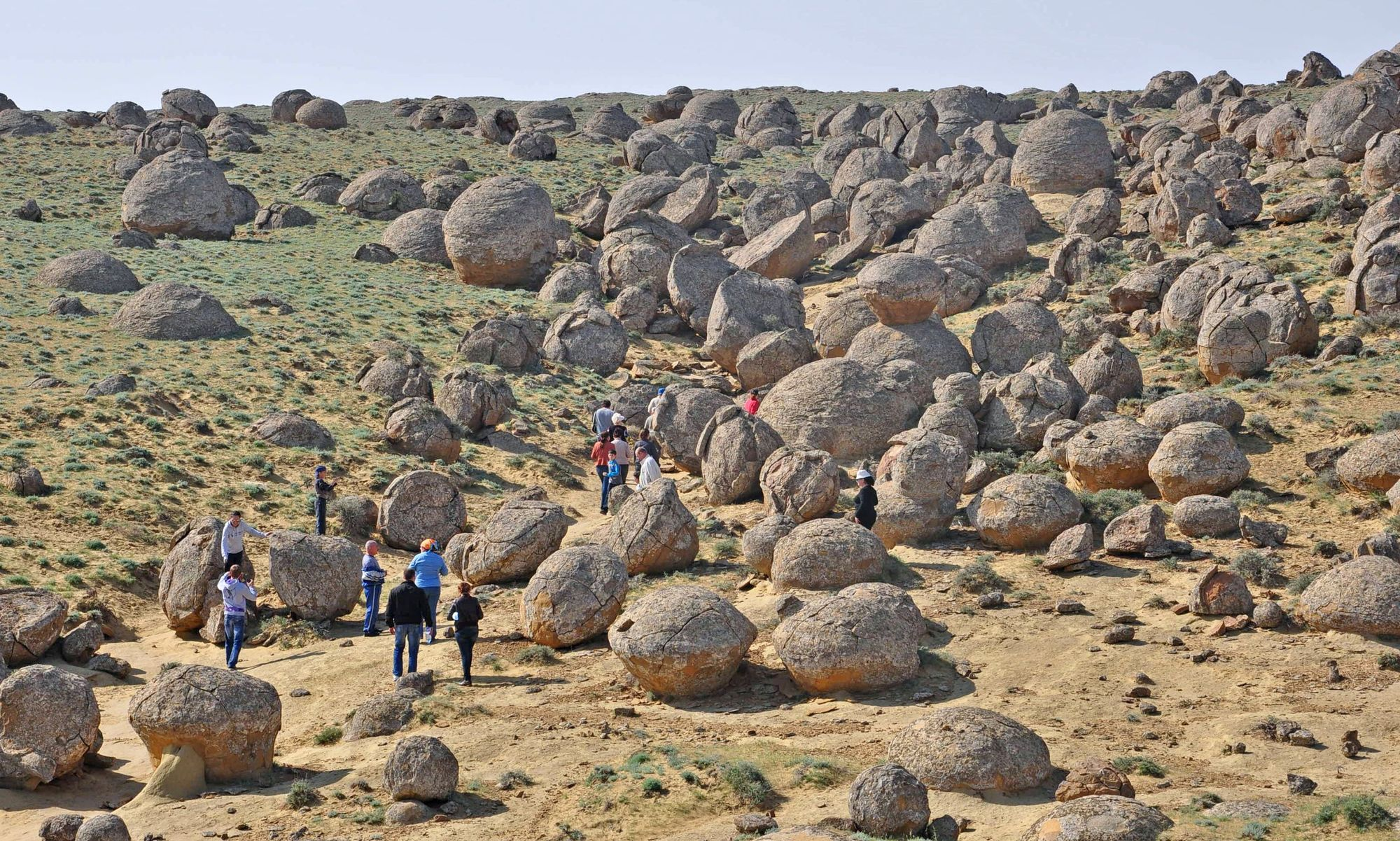
Concretions in Torysh, Western Kazakhstan

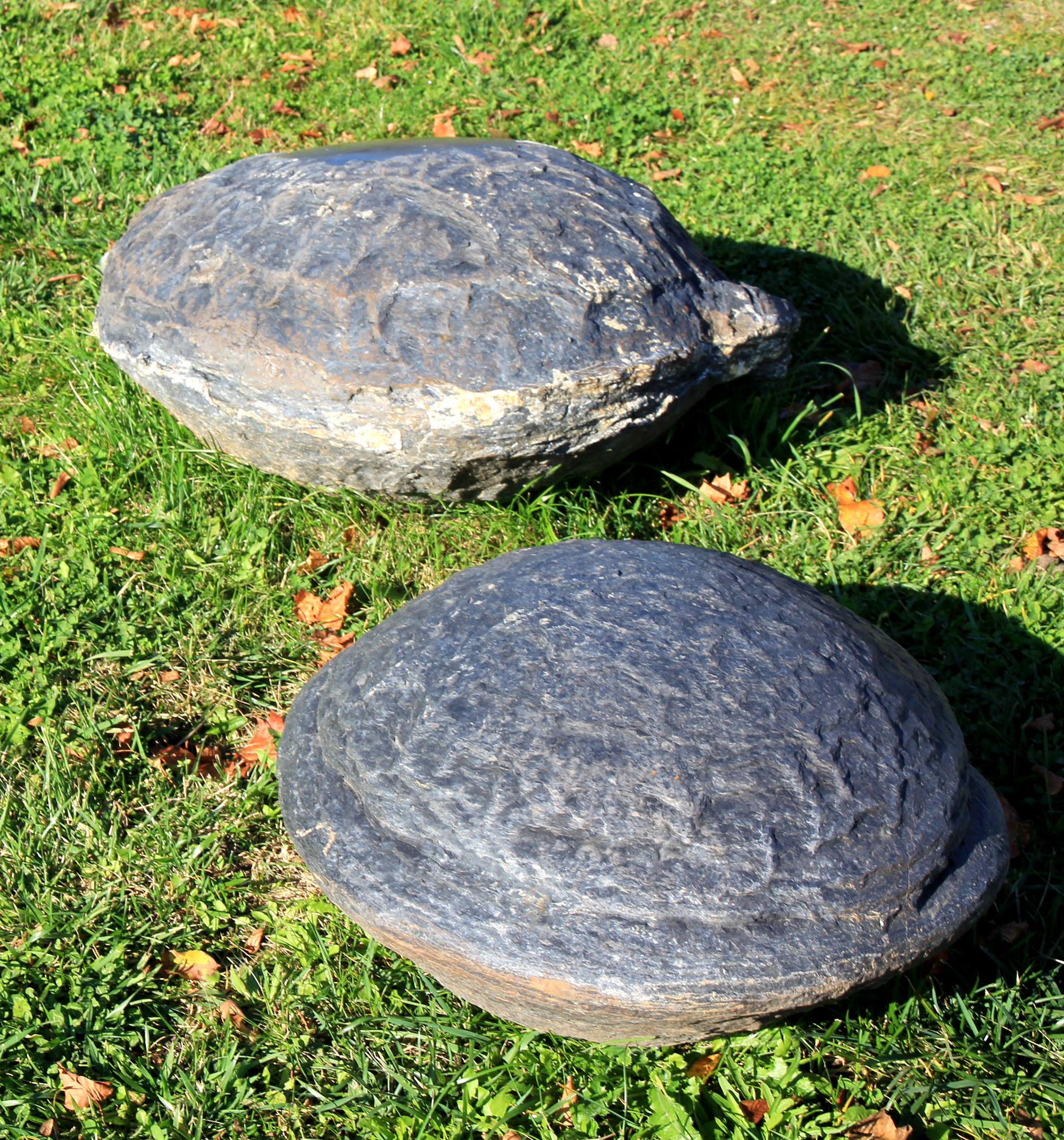
Concretions with lenticular shapes from an island in the Vltava river, Prague, Czech Republic

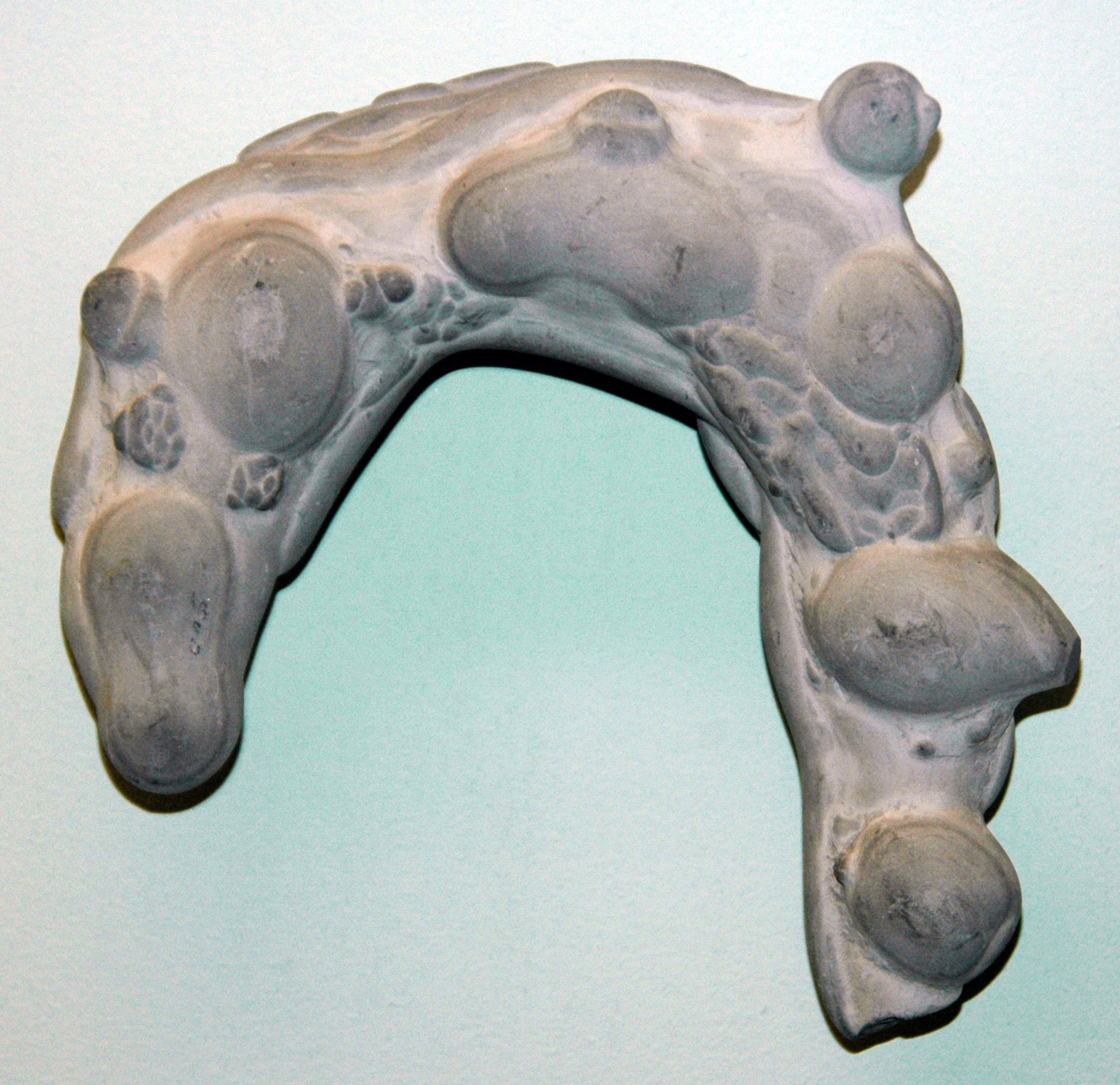
Marlstone aggregate concretion, Sault Ste. Marie, Michigan, United States

A concretion is a hard and compact mass formed by the precipitation of mineral cement within the spaces between particles, and is found in sedimentary rock or soil. Concretions are often ovoid or spherical in shape, although irregular shapes also occur. The word concretion is borrowed from Latin concretio '(act of) compacting, condensing, congealing, uniting', itself derived from concrescere 'to thicken, condense, congeal', from con- 'together' and crescere 'to grow'.

Concretions form within layers of sedimentary strata that have already been deposited. They usually form early in the burial history of the sediment, before the rest of the sediment is hardened into rock. This concretionary cement often makes the concretion harder and more resistant to weathering than the host stratum.

There is an important distinction to draw between concretions and nodules. Concretions are formed from mineral precipitation around some kind of nucleus while a nodule is a replacement body.

Descriptions dating from the 18th century attest to the fact that concretions have long been regarded as geological curiosities. Because of the variety of unusual shapes, sizes and compositions, concretions have been interpreted to be dinosaur eggs, animal and plant fossils (called pseudofossils), extraterrestrial debris or human artifacts.

== Origins ==
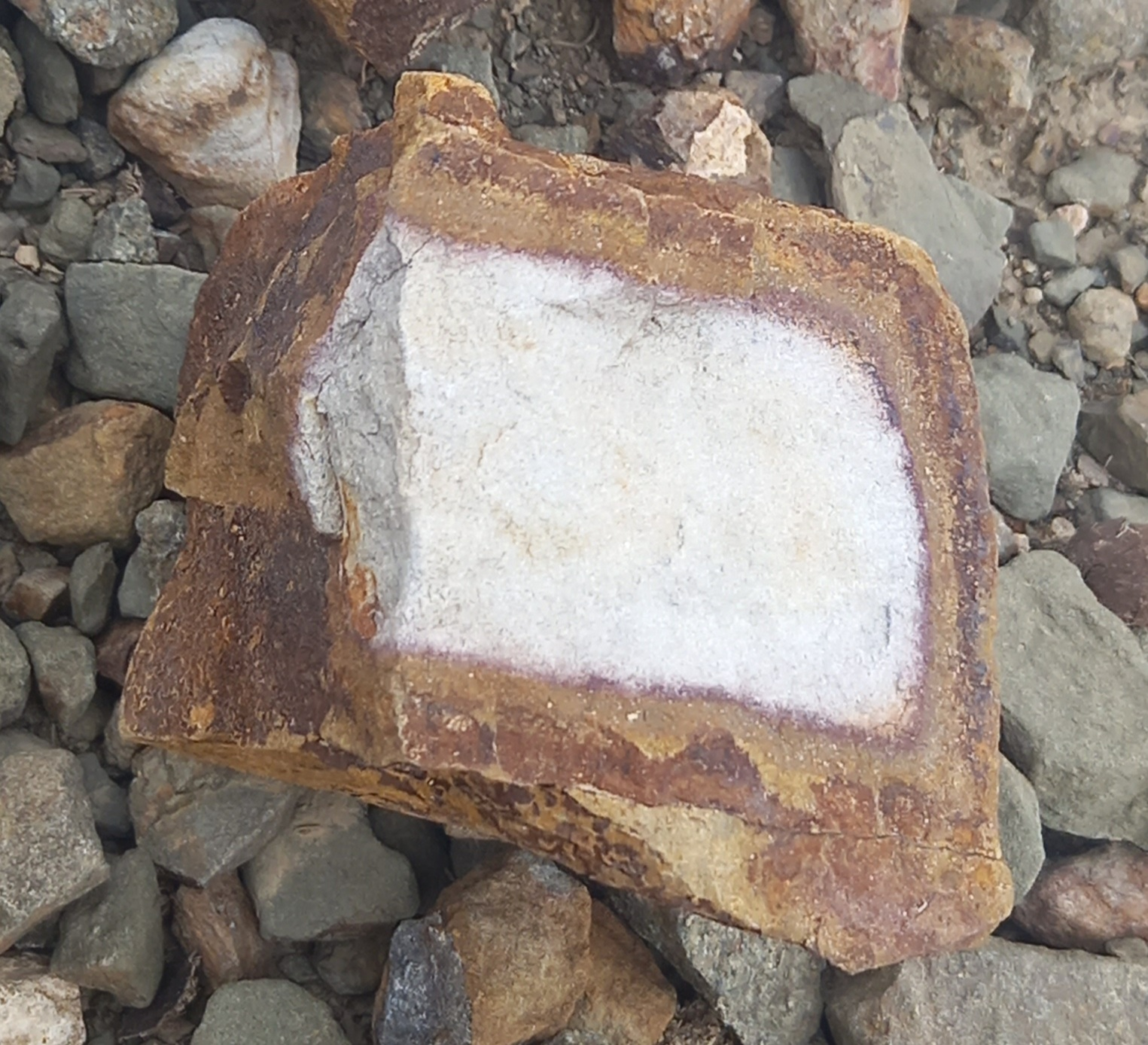
Concretion rock with white core from the Middle Jurassic of Iran

Detailed studies have demonstrated that concretions form after sediments (small rock particles eroded from a larger rock and carried away to a new location – often by water) are buried but before the sediment is fully lithified (compressed into solid rock) during diagenesis.

Concretions typically form around a solid core called a "nucleus". This core is often composed of organic material, such as a leaf, tooth, piece of shell or fossil. A mineral solution (that is, a mineral dissolved in water) then precipitates (crystallizes) around the nucleus and cements sediment around it. For this reason, fossil collectors commonly break open concretions in their search for fossil animal and plant specimens. Some of the most unusual concretion nuclei are World War II military shells, bombs, and shrapnel, which are found inside siderite concretions found in an English coastal salt marsh.

Depending on the environmental conditions present at the time of their formation, concretions can be created by either concentric or pervasive growth. In concentric growth, the concretion grows as successive layers of mineral precipitate around a central core. This process results in roughly spherical concretions that grow with time. In the case of pervasive growth, cementation of the host sediments, by infilling of its pore space by precipitated minerals, occurs simultaneously throughout the volume of the area, which in time becomes a concretion. Concretions are often exposed at the surface by subsequent erosion that removes the weaker, uncemented material.

== Appearance ==
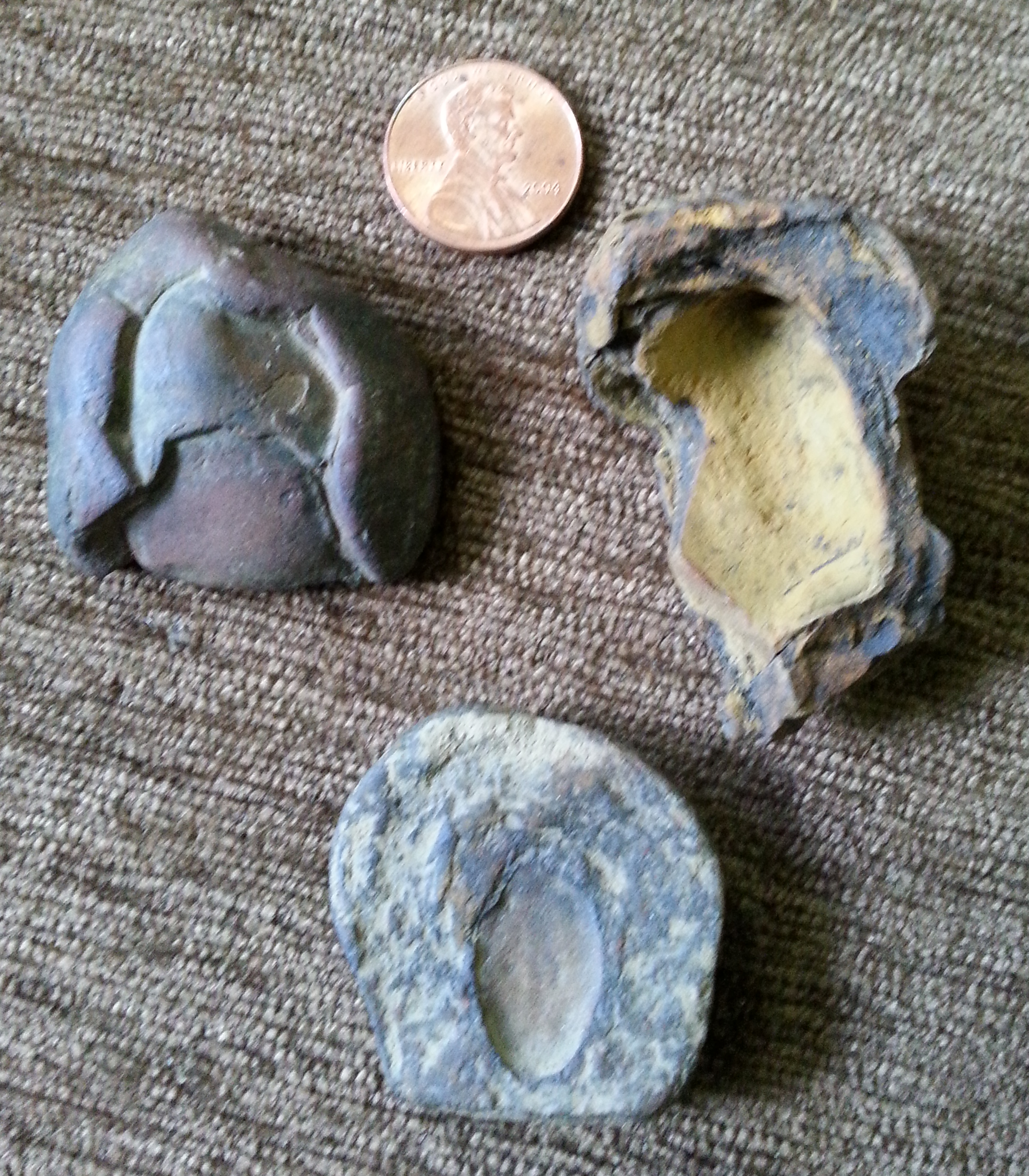
Samples of small rock concretions found at McConnells Mill State Park in Pennsylvania

Concretions vary in shape, hardness and size, ranging from objects that require a magnifying lens to be clearly visible to huge bodies three meters in diameter and weighing several thousand pounds. The giant, red concretions occurring in Theodore Roosevelt National Park, in North Dakota, are almost 3 m (9.8 ft) in diameter. Spheroidal concretions, as large as 9 m (30 ft) in diameter, have been found eroding out of the Qasr el Sagha Formation within the Faiyum depression of Egypt. Concretions occur in a wide variety of shapes, including spheres, disks, tubes, and grape-like or soap bubble-like aggregates.

== Composition ==
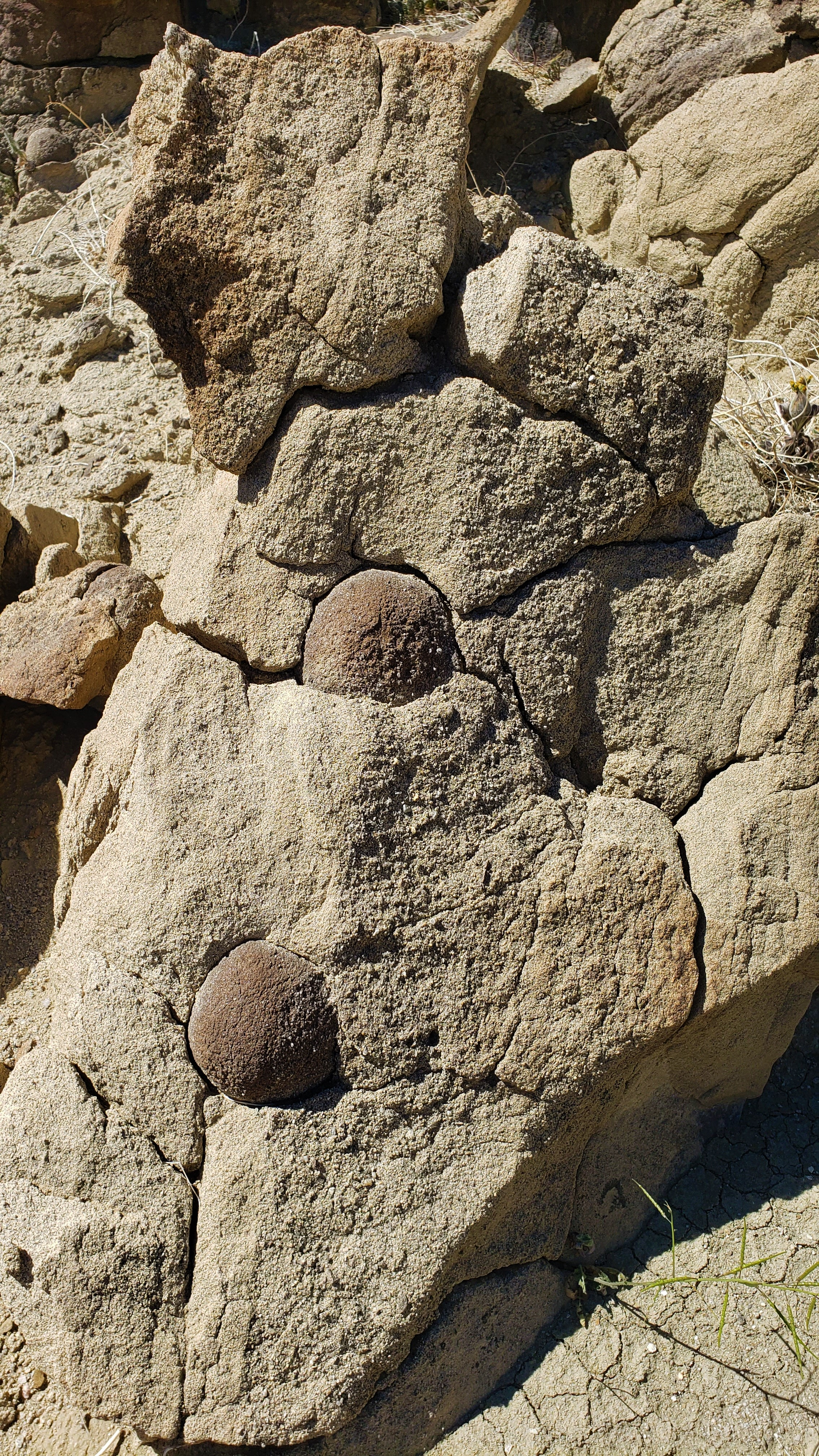
Spherical concretions embedded in sandstone in Anza-Borrego Desert State Park in the United States

Concretions are commonly composed of a mineral present as a minor component of the host rock. For example, concretions in sandstones or shales are commonly formed of a carbonate mineral such as calcite; those in limestones are commonly an amorphous or microcrystalline form of silica such as chert, flint, or jasper; while those in black shale may be composed of pyrite. Other minerals that form concretions include iron oxides or hydroxides (such as goethite and hematite), dolomite, siderite, ankerite, marcasite, barite, and gypsum.

Although concretions often consist of a single dominant mineral, other minerals can be present depending on the environmental conditions that created them. For example, carbonate concretions, which form in response to the reduction of sulfates by bacteria, often contain minor percentages of pyrite. Other concretions, which formed as a result of microbial sulfate reduction, consist of a mixture of calcite, barite, and pyrite.

== Occurrence ==
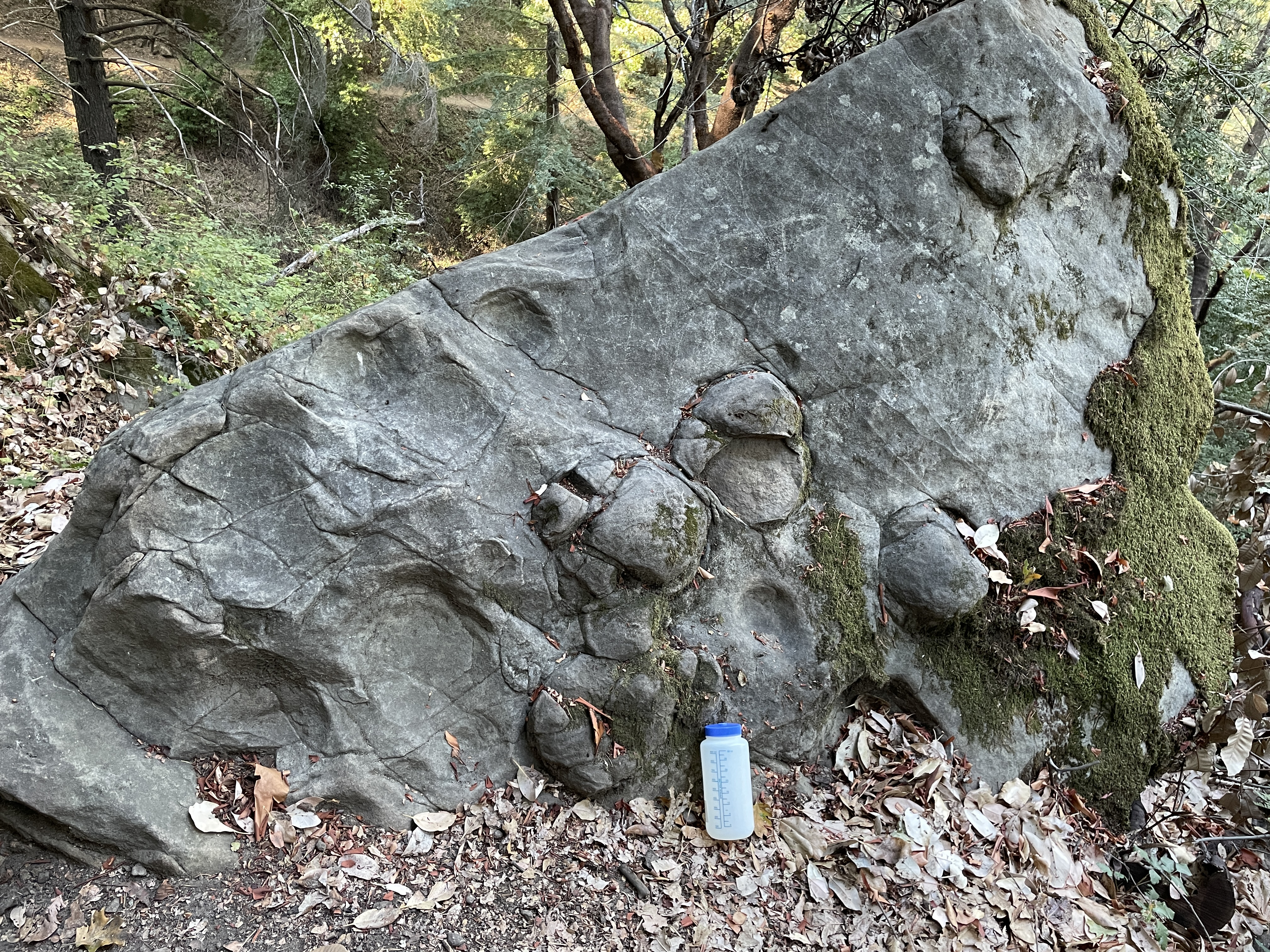
Vaqueros Formation sandstone with concretions

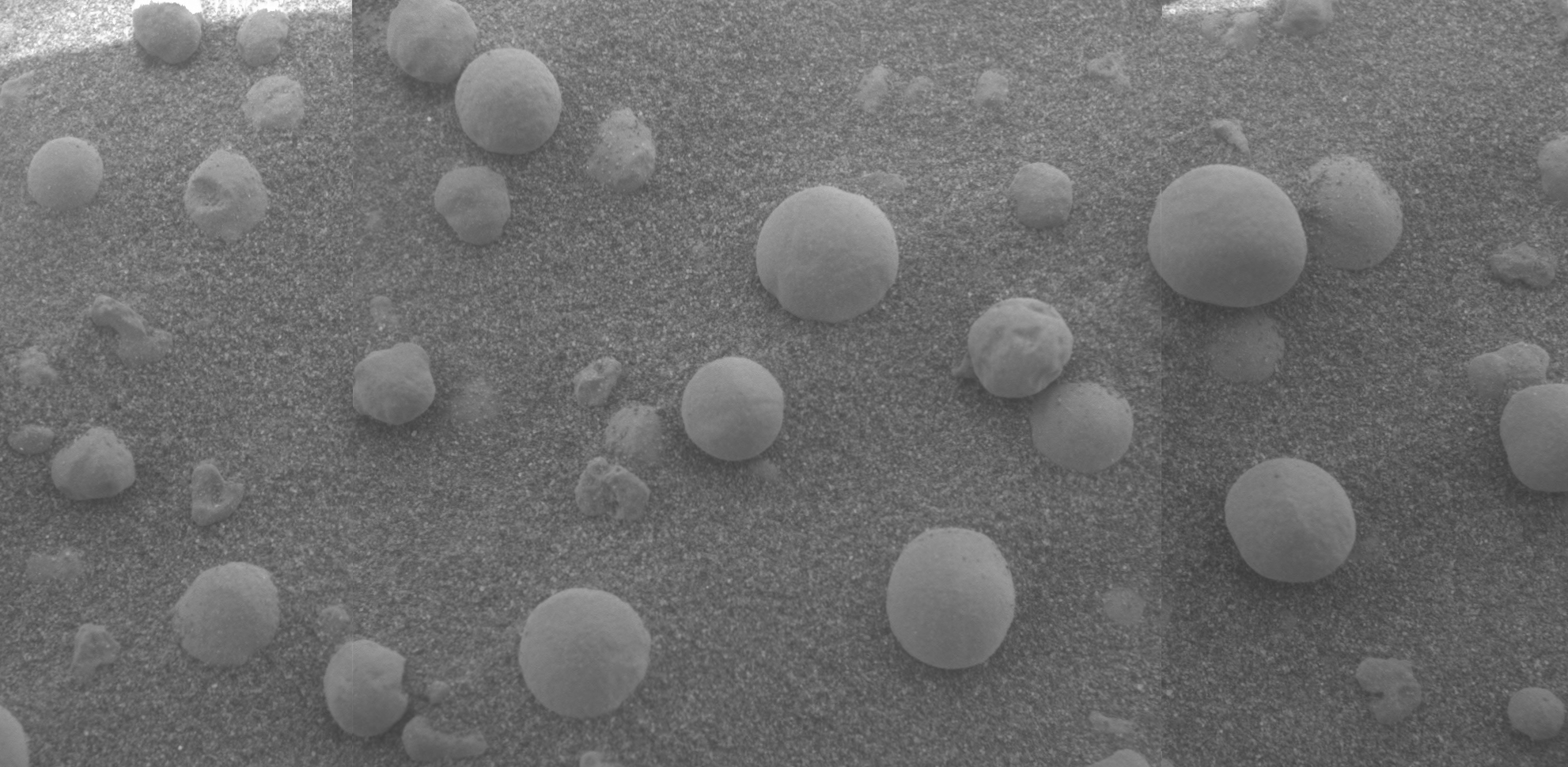
A mosaic of images showing spherules, some partly embedded, spread over (smaller) soil grains on the Martian surface

Concretions are found in a variety of rocks, but are particularly common in shales, siltstones, and sandstones. They often outwardly resemble fossils or rocks that look as if they do not belong to the stratum in which they were found. Occasionally, concretions contain a fossil, either as its nucleus or as a component that has been incorporated during its growth but concretions are not fossils themselves. They appear in nodular patches, concentrated along bedding planes, or protruding from weathered cliffsides.

Small hematite concretions or Martian spherules have been observed by the Opportunity rover in the Eagle Crater on Mars.

== Types of concretion ==
Concretions vary considerably in their compositions, shapes, sizes and modes of origin.

=== Septarian concretions ===
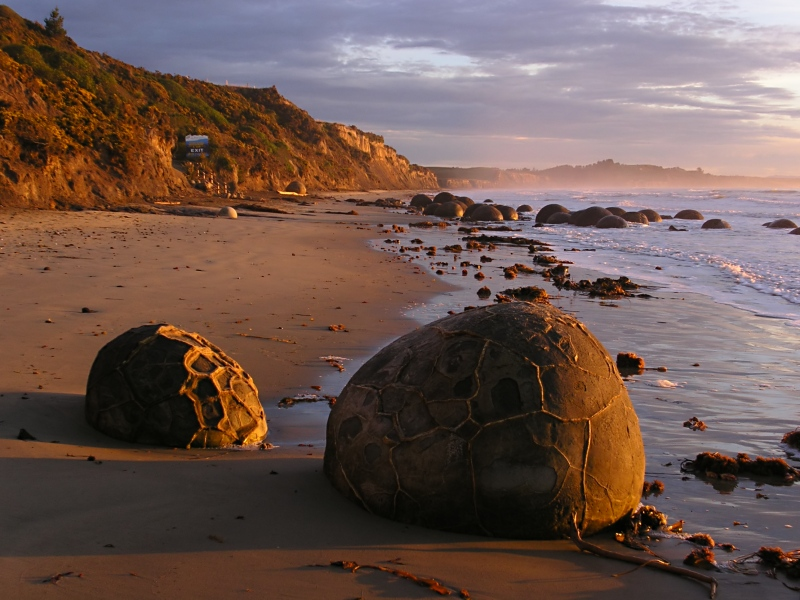
Moeraki Boulders, New Zealand

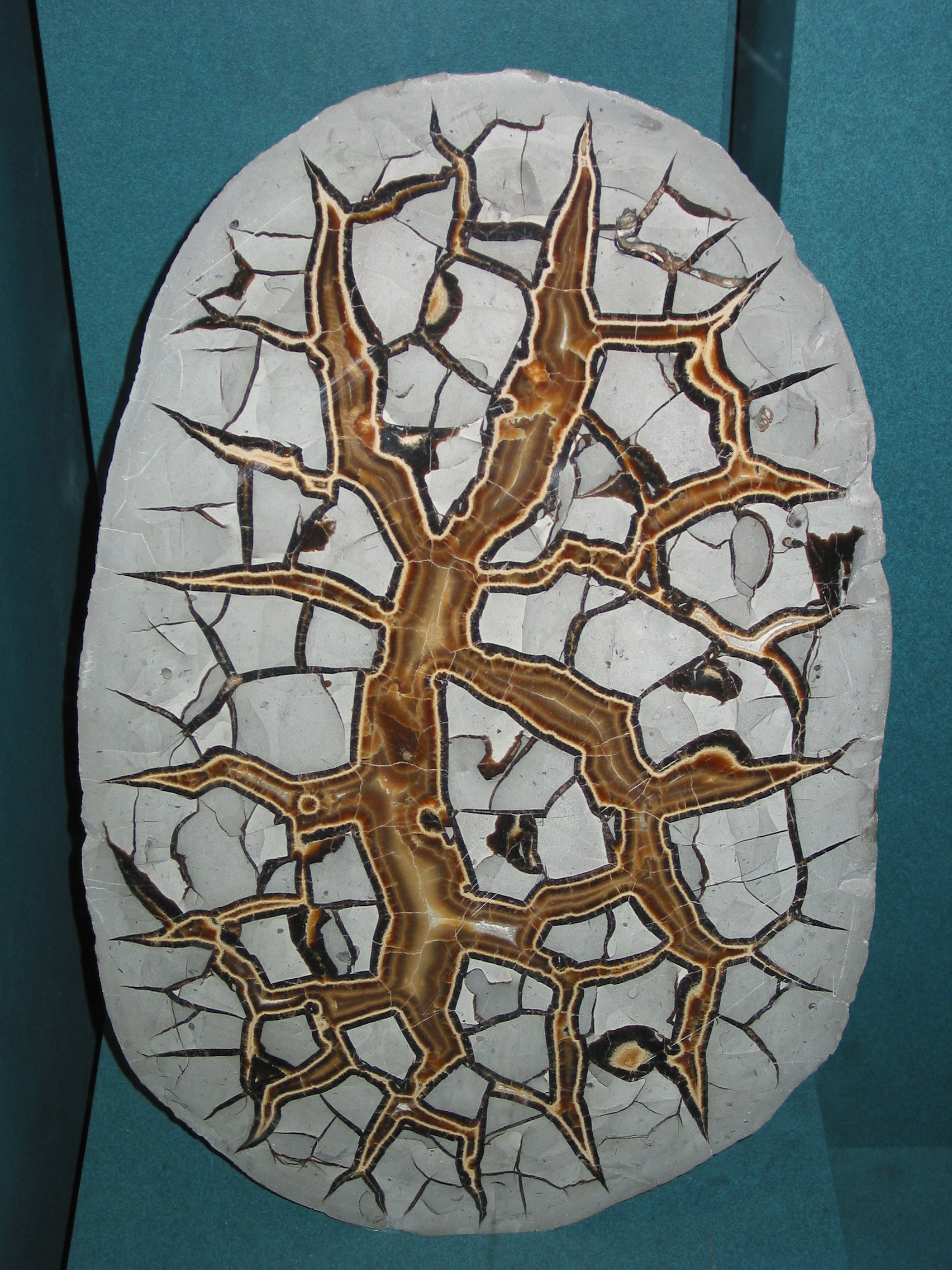
A slice of a typical carbonate-rich septarian nodule.

Septarian concretions (or septarian nodules) are carbonate-rich concretions containing angular cavities or cracks (septaria; sg. septarium, from the Latin septum "partition, separating element", referring to the cracks or cavities separating polygonal blocks of hardened material). Septarian nodules are characteristically found in carbonate-rich mudrock. They typically show an internal structure of polyhedral blocks (the matrix) separated by mineral-filled radiating cracks (the septaria) which taper towards the rim of the concretion. The radiating cracks sometimes intersect a second set of concentric cracks. However, the cracks can be highly variable in shape and volume, as well as the degree of shrinkage they indicate. The matrix is typically composed of argillaceous carbonate, such as clay ironstone, while the crack filling is usually calcite. The calcite often contains significant iron (ferroan calcite) and may have inclusions of pyrite and clay minerals. The brown calcite common in septaria may also be colored by organic compounds produced by bacterial decay of organic matter in the original sediments.

Septarian concretions are found in many kinds of mudstone, including lacustrine siltstones such as the Beaufort Group of northwest Mozambique, but are most commonly found in marine shales, such as the Staffin Shale Formation of Skye, the Kimmeridge Clay of England, or the Mancos Group of North America.

It is commonly thought that concretions grew incrementally from the inside outwards. Chemical and textural zoning in many concretions are consistent with this concentric model of formation. However, the evidence is ambiguous, and many or most concretions may have formed by pervasive cementation of the entire volume of the concretion at the same time. For example, if the porosity after early cementation varies across the concretion, then later cementation filling this porosity would produce compositional zoning even with uniform pore water composition. Whether the initial cementation was concentric or pervasive, there is considerable evidence that it occurred quickly and at shallow depth of burial. In many cases, there is clear evidence that the initial concretion formed around some kind of organic nucleus.

The origin of the carbonate-rich septaria is still debated. One possibility is that dehydration hardens the outer shell of the concretion while causing the interior matrix to shrink until it cracks. Shrinkage of a still-wet matrix may also take place through syneresis, in which the particles of colloidal material in the interior of the concretion become gradually more tightly bound while expelling water. Another possibility is that early cementation reduces the permeability of the concretion, trapping pore fluids and creating excess pore pressure during continued burial. This could crack the interior at depths as shallow as 10 meters (33 ft). A more speculative theory is that the septaria form by brittle fracturing resulting from earthquakes. Regardless of the mechanism of crack formation, the septaria, like the concretion itself, likely form at a relatively shallow depth of burial of less than 50 meters (160 ft) and possibly as little as 12 meters (39 ft). Geologically young concretions of the Errol Beds of Scotland show texture consistent with formation from flocculated sediments containing organic matter, whose decay left tiny gas bubbles (30 to 35 microns in diameter) and a soap of calcium fatty acids salts. The conversion of these fatty acids to calcium carbonate may have promoted shrinkage and fracture of the matrix.

One model for the formation of septarian concretions in the Staffin Shales suggests that the concretions started as semirigid masses of flocculated clay. The individual colloidal clay particles were bound by extracellular polymeric substances or EPS produced by colonizing bacteria. The decay of these substances, together with syneresis of the host mud, produced stresses that fractured the interiors of the concretions while still at shallow burial depth. This was possible only with the bacterial colonization and the right sedimentation rate. Additional fractures formed during subsequent episodes of shallow burial (during the Cretaceous) or uplift (during the Paleogene). Water derived from rain and snow (meteoric water) later infiltrated the beds and deposited ferroan calcite in the cracks.

Septarian concretions often record a complex history of formation that provides geologists with information on early diagenesis, the initial stages of the formation of sedimentary rock from unconsolidated sediments. Most concretions appear to have formed at depths of burial where sulfate-reducing microorganisms are active. This corresponds to burial depths of 15 to 150 meters (49 to 492 ft), and is characterized by generation of carbon dioxide, increased alkalinity and precipitation of calcium carbonate. However, there is some evidence that formation continues well into the methanogenic zone beneath the sulfate reduction zone.

A spectacular example of boulder septarian concretions, which are as much as 3 meters (9.8 feet) in diameter, are the Moeraki Boulders. These concretions are found eroding out of Paleocene mudstone of the Moeraki Formation exposed along the coast near Moeraki, South Island, New Zealand. They are composed of calcite-cemented mud with septarian veins of calcite and rare late-stage quartz and ferrous dolomite. The much smaller septarian concretions found in the Kimmeridge Clay exposed in cliffs along the Wessex coast of England are more typical examples of septarian concretions.

=== Cannonball concretions ===
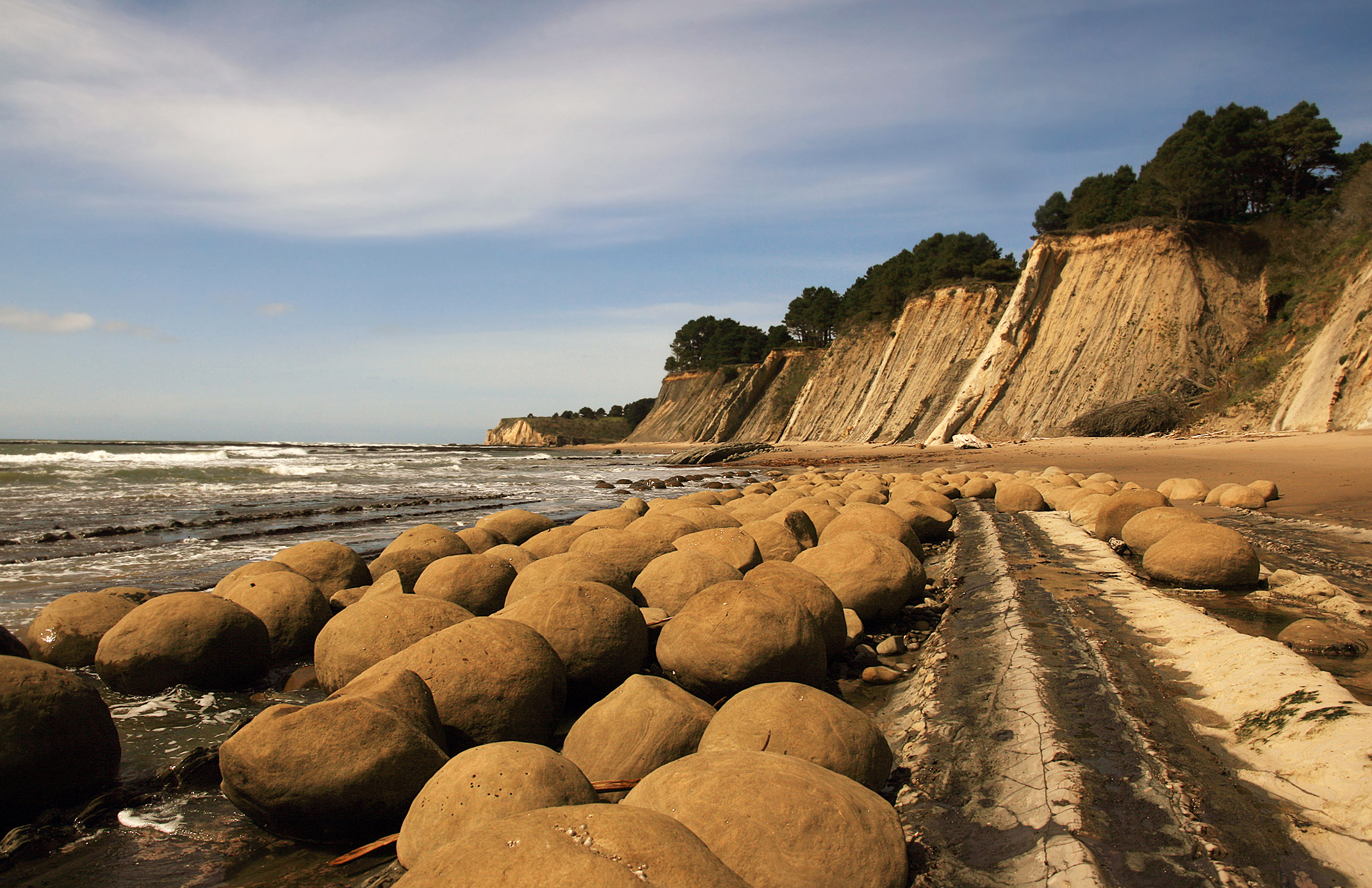
Concretions on Bowling Ball Beach (Mendocino County, California, United States) weathered out of steeply tilted Cenozoic mudstone

Cannonball concretions are large spherical concretions, which resemble cannonballs. These are found along the Cannonball River within Morton and Sioux Counties, North Dakota, and can reach 3 m (9.8 ft) in diameter. They were created by early cementation of sand and silt by calcite. Similar cannonball concretions, which are as much as 4 to 6 m (13 to 20 ft) in diameter, are found associated with sandstone outcrops of the Frontier Formation in northeast Utah and central Wyoming. They formed by the early cementation of sand by calcite. Somewhat weathered and eroded giant cannonball concretions, as large as 6 meters (20 feet) in diameter, occur in abundance at "Rock City" in Ottawa County, Kansas. Large and spherical boulders are also found along Koekohe beach near Moeraki on the east coast of the South Island of New Zealand. The Moeraki Boulders, Ward Beach boulders and Koutu Boulders of New Zealand are examples of septarian concretions, which are also cannonball concretions. Large spherical rocks, which are found on the shore of Lake Huron near Kettle Point, Ontario, and locally known as "kettles", are typical cannonball concretions. Cannonball concretions have also been reported from Van Mijenfjorden, Spitsbergen; near Haines Junction, Yukon Territory, Canada; Jameson Land, East Greenland; near Mecevici, Ozimici, and Zavidovici in Bosnia-Herzegovina; in Alaska in the Kenai Peninsula Captain Cook State Park on north of Cook Inlet beach and on Kodiak Island northeast of Fossil Beach. This type of concretion is also found in Romania, where they are known as trovants.

=== Hiatus concretions ===
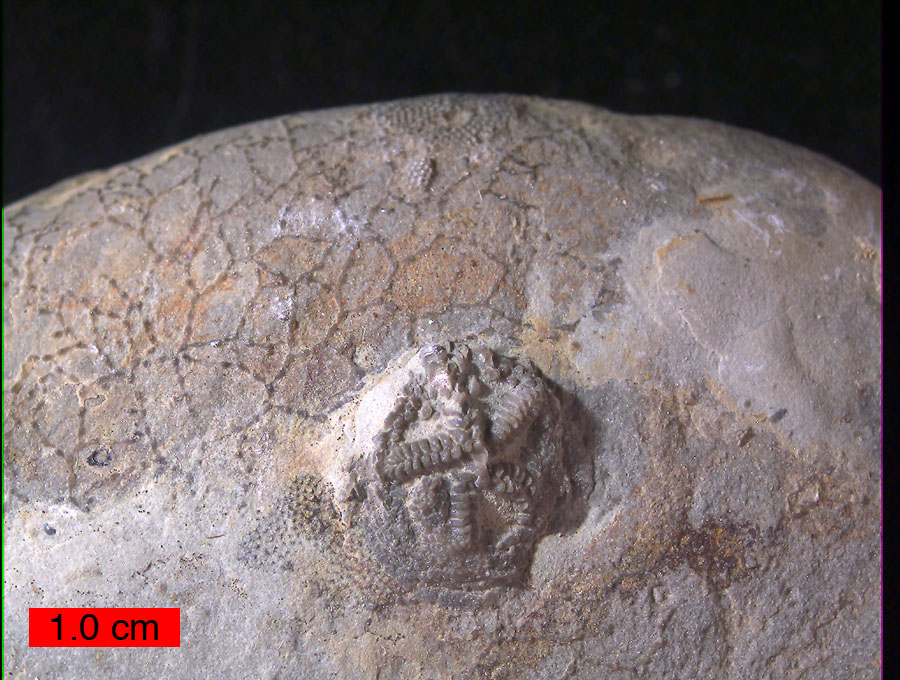
Hiatus concretion encrusted by bryozoans (thin, branching forms) and an edrioasteroid; Kope Formation (Upper Ordovician), northern Kentucky

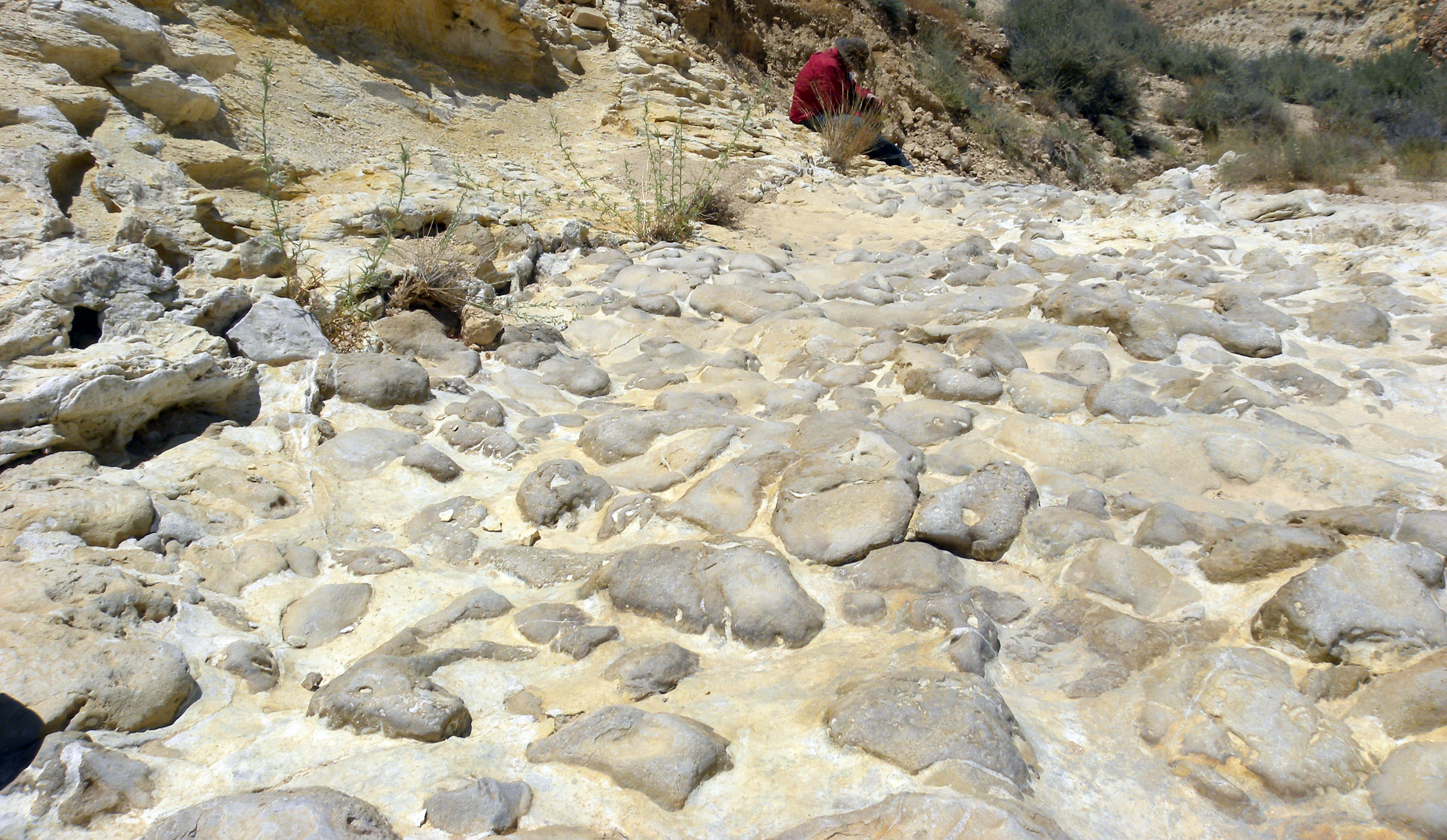
Hiatus concretions at the base of the Menuha Formation (Upper Cretaceous), the Negev, southern Israel

Hiatus concretions are distinguished by their stratigraphic history of exhumation, exposure and reburial. They are found where submarine erosion has concentrated early diagenetic concretions as lag surfaces by washing away surrounding fine-grained sediments. Their significance for stratigraphy, sedimentology and paleontology was first noted by Voigt who referred to them as Hiatus-Konkretionen. "Hiatus" refers to the break in sedimentation that allowed this erosion and exposure. They are found throughout the fossil record but are most common during periods in which calcite sea conditions prevailed, such as the Ordovician, Jurassic and Cretaceous. Most are formed from the cemented infillings of burrow systems in siliciclastic or carbonate sediments.

A distinctive feature of hiatus concretions separating them from other types is that they were often encrusted by marine organisms including bryozoans, echinoderms and tube worms in the Paleozoic and bryozoans, oysters and tube worms in the Mesozoic and Cenozoic. Hiatus concretions are also often significantly bored by worms and bivalves.

=== Elongate concretions ===
Elongate concretions form parallel to sedimentary strata and have been studied extensively due to the inferred influence of phreatic (saturated) zone groundwater flow direction on the orientation of the axis of elongation. In addition to providing information about the orientation of past fluid flow in the host rock, elongate concretions can provide insight into local permeability trends (i.e., permeability correlation structure; variation in groundwater velocity, and the types of geological features that influence flow.

Elongate concretions are well known in the Kimmeridge Clay formation of northwest Europe. In outcrops, where they have acquired the name "doggers", they are typically only a few meters across, but in the subsurface they can be seen to penetrate up to tens of meters of along-hole dimension. Unlike limestone beds, however, it is impossible to consistently correlate them between even closely spaced wells.

=== Moqui Marbles ===
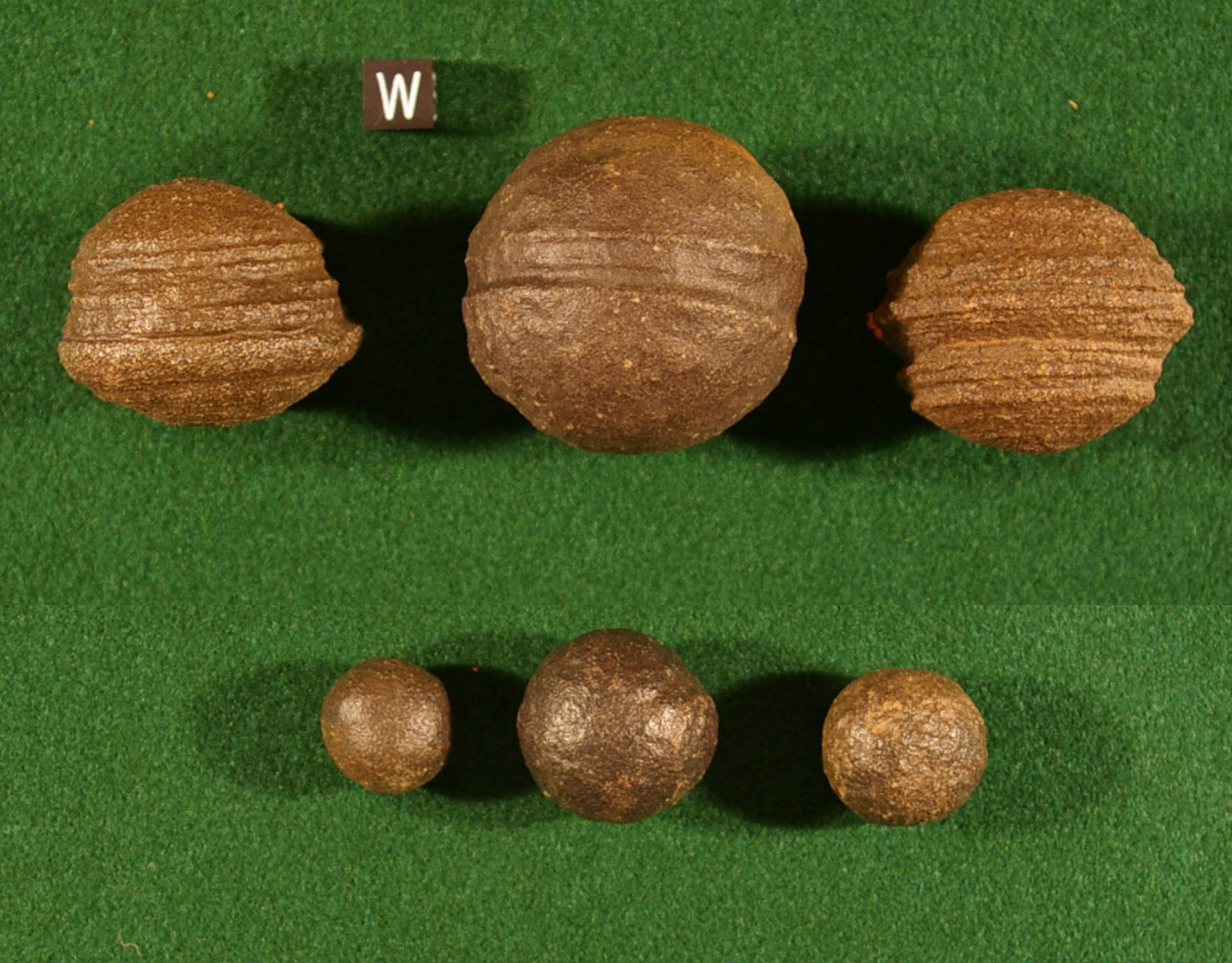
Moqui Marbles, hematite, goethite concretions, from the Navajo Sandstone of southeast Utah. The "W" cube at the top is one cubic centimeter in size.

Moqui Marbles, also called Moqui balls or "Moki marbles", are iron oxide concretions which can be found eroding in great abundance out of outcrops of the Navajo Sandstone within south-central and southeastern Utah. These concretions range in shape from spheres to discs, buttons, spiked balls, cylindrical forms, and other odd shapes. They range from pea-size to baseball-size.

The concretions were created by the precipitation of iron, which was dissolved in groundwater. The iron was originally present as a thin film of iron oxide surrounding sand grains in the Navajo Sandstone. Groundwater containing methane or petroleum from underlying rock beds reacted with the iron oxide, converting it to soluble reduced iron. When the iron-bearing groundwater came into contact with more oxygen-rich groundwater, the reduced iron was converted back to insoluble iron oxide, which formed the concretions. It is possible that reduced iron first formed siderite concretions that were subsequently oxidized. Iron-oxidizing bacteria may have played a role.

=== Kansas pop rocks ===
Kansas pop rocks are concretions of either iron sulfide, i.e. pyrite and marcasite, or in some cases jarosite, which are found in outcrops of the Smoky Hill Chalk Member of the Niobrara Formation within Gove County, Kansas. They are typically associated with thin layers of altered volcanic ash, called bentonite, that occur within the chalk comprising the Smoky Hill Chalk Member. A few of these concretions enclose, at least in part, large flattened valves of inoceramid bivalves. These concretions range in size from a few millimeters to as much as 0.7 m (2.3 ft) in length and 12 cm (0.39 ft) in thickness. Most of these concretions are oblate spheroids. Other "pop rocks" are small polycuboid pyrite concretions, which are as much as 7 cm (0.23 ft) in diameter. These concretions are called "pop rocks" because they explode if thrown in a fire. Also, when they are either cut or hammered, they produce sparks and a burning sulfur smell. Contrary to what has been published on the Internet, none of the iron sulfide concretions, which are found in the Smoky Hill Chalk Member were created by either the replacement of fossils or by metamorphic processes. In fact, metamorphic rocks are completely absent from the Smoky Hill Chalk Member. Instead, all of these iron sulfide concretions were created by the precipitation of iron sulfides within anoxic marine calcareous ooze after it had accumulated and before it had lithified into chalk.

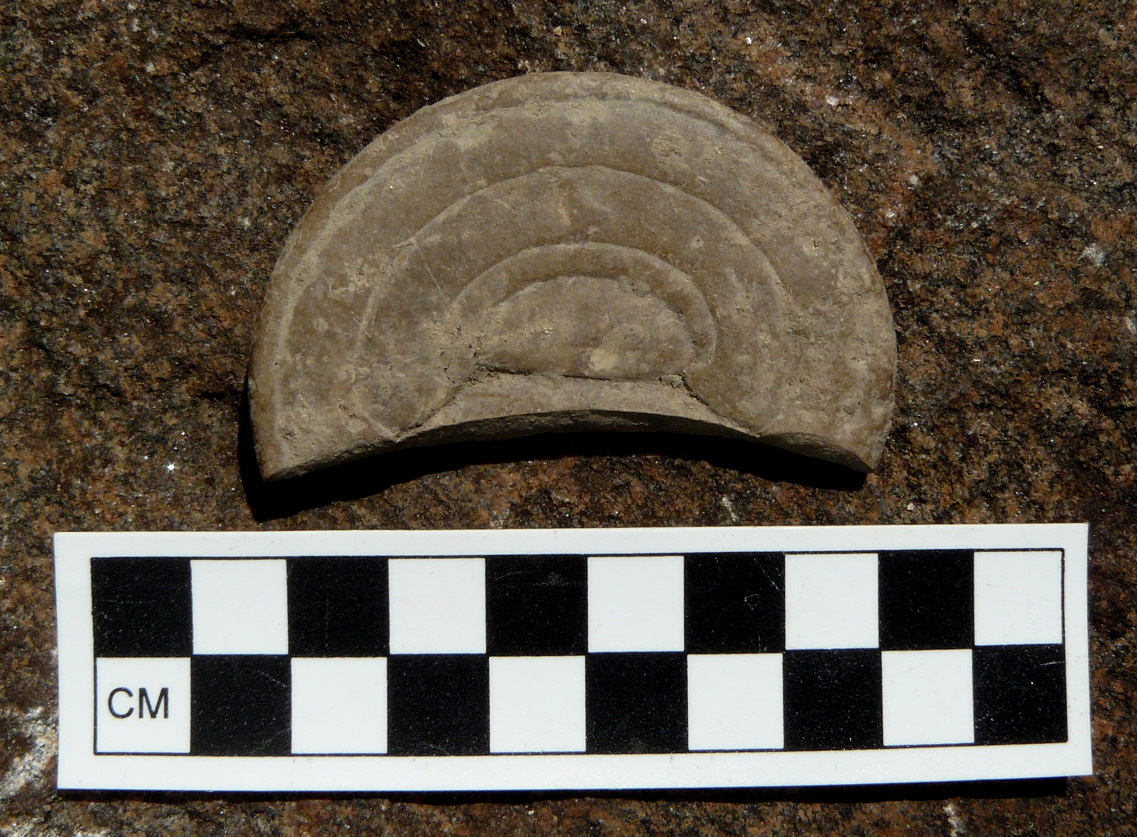
Marleka fairy stone from Stensö in Sweden

Iron sulfide concretions, such as the Kansas Pop rocks, consisting of either pyrite and marcasite, are nonmagnetic. On the other hand, iron sulfide concretions, which either are composed of or contain either pyrrhotite or smythite, will be magnetic to varying degrees. Prolonged heating of either a pyrite or marcasite concretion will convert portions of either mineral into pyrrhotite causing the concretion to become slightly magnetic.

=== Claystones, clay dogs, and fairy stones ===
Disc concretions composed of calcium carbonate are often found eroding out of exposures of interlaminated silt and clay, varved, proglacial lake deposits. For example, great numbers of strikingly symmetrical concretions have been found eroding out of outcrops of Quaternary proglacial lake sediments along and in the gravels of the Connecticut River and its tributaries in Massachusetts and Vermont. Depending the specific source of these concretions, they vary in an infinite variety of forms that include disc-shapes; crescent-shapes; watch-shapes; cylindrical or club-shapes; botryoidal masses; and animal-like forms. They can vary in length from 2 in (5.1 cm) to over 22 in (56 cm) and often exhibit concentric grooves on their surfaces. In the Connecticut River Valley, these concretions are often called "claystones" because the concretions are harder than the clay enclosing them. In local brickyards, they were called "clay-dogs" either because of their animal-like forms or the concretions were nuisances in molding bricks. Similar disc-shaped calcium carbonate concretions have also been found in the Harricana River valley in the Abitibi-Témiscamingue administrative region of Quebec, and in Östergötland county, Sweden. In Scandinavia, they are known as "marlekor" ("fairy stones").

=== Gogottes ===
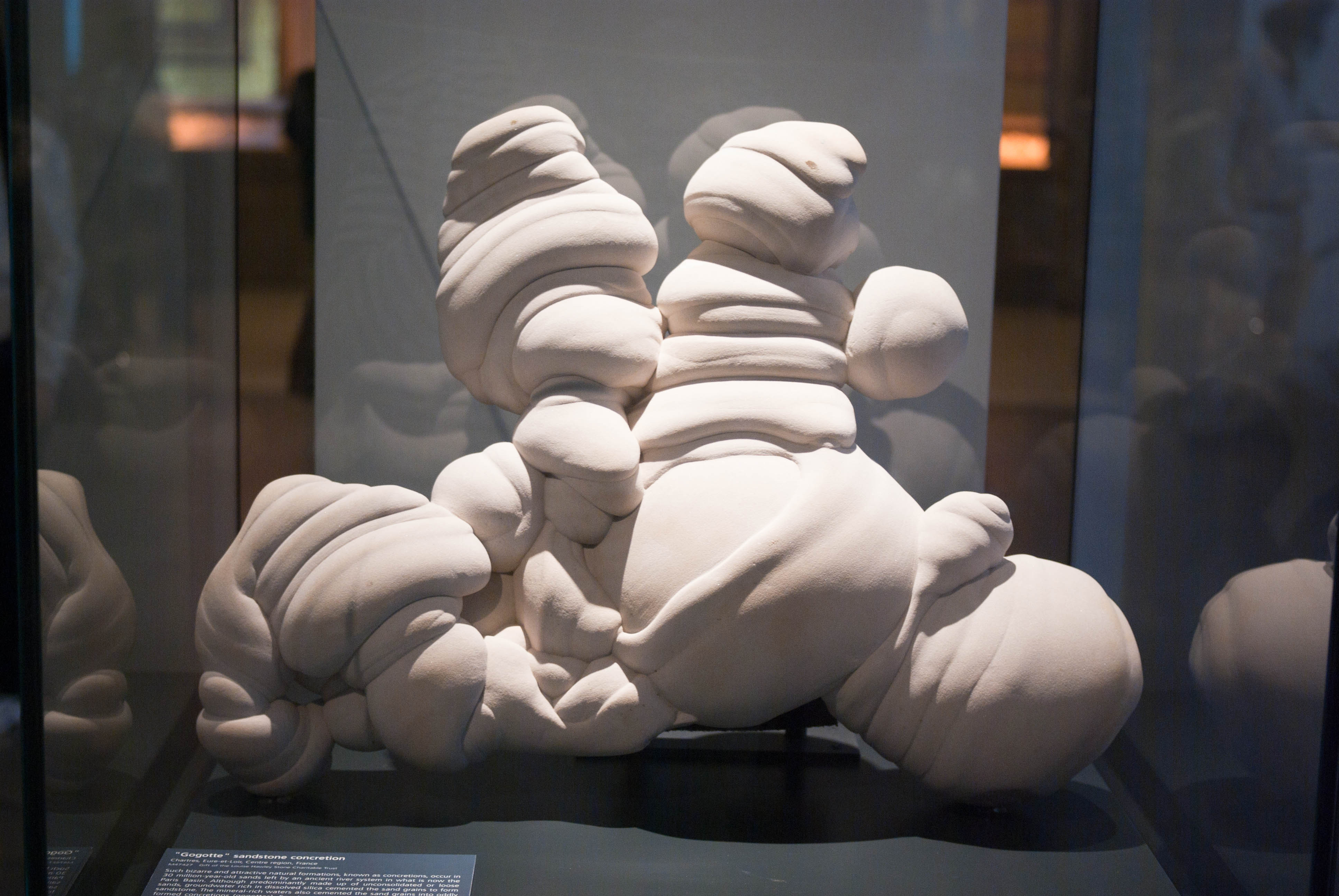
Gogotte concretion

Gogottes are sandstone concretions found in Oligocene (~30 million years) aged sediments near Fontainebleau, France. Gogottes have fetched high prices at auction due to their sculpture-like quality.

== See also ==
- Bowling Ball Beach – Beach in Mendocino County, California, US
- Caliche, also known as calcrete – Calcium carbonate based concretion of sediment in arid and semi-arid soils
- Champ Island – Island in Franz Josef Land, Russia
- Diagenesis – Physico-chemical changes in sediments occurring after their deposition
- Dinocochlea – Trace fossil in the Natural History Museum, London
- Dorodango – Japanese art form in which earth and water are molded to create a delicate shiny sphere
- Gypcrust – Hardened layer of soil with a high percentage of gypsum. CaSO_{4} concretions in arid and semi-arid soils
- Klerksdorp sphere – Natural nodule-like rock concretions
- Martian spherules – Small iron oxide spherules found on Mars
- Moeraki Boulders – Large spherical boulders on Otago coast, New Zealand
- Mushroom Rock State Park – State park in Kansas, United States
- Nodule (geology) – Small mass of a mineral with a contrasting composition to the enclosing sediment or rock, a replacement body, not to be confused with a concretion
- Rock City, Kansas – Park in Kansas, U.S.
- Speleothem – Structure formed in a cave by the deposition of minerals from water. CaCO_{3}
