= Timeline of Opportunity =

Robotic rover that was active on the planet Mars from 2004 to 2018

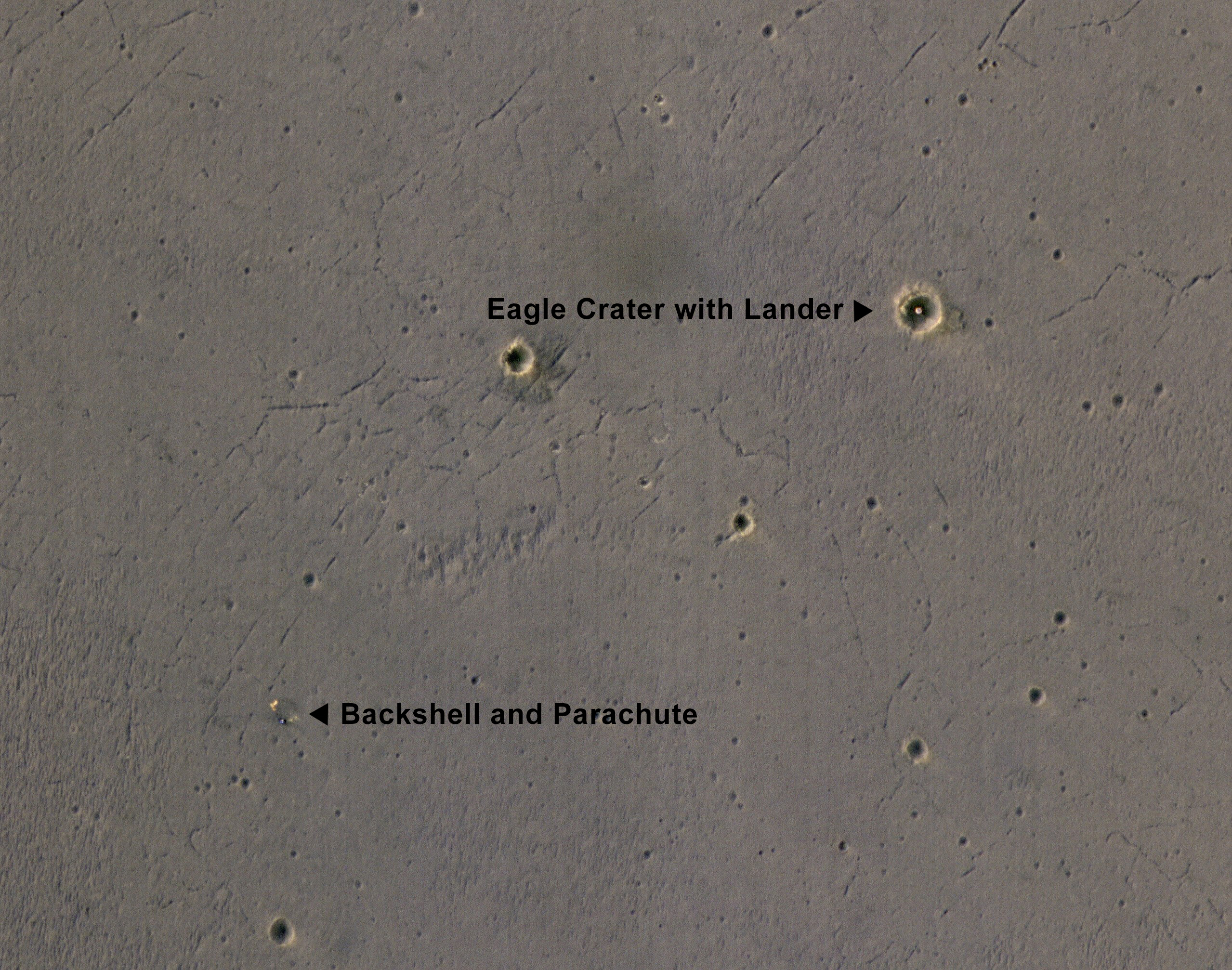
Opportunity rover's landing site (HiRISE; MRO; April 8, 2015).

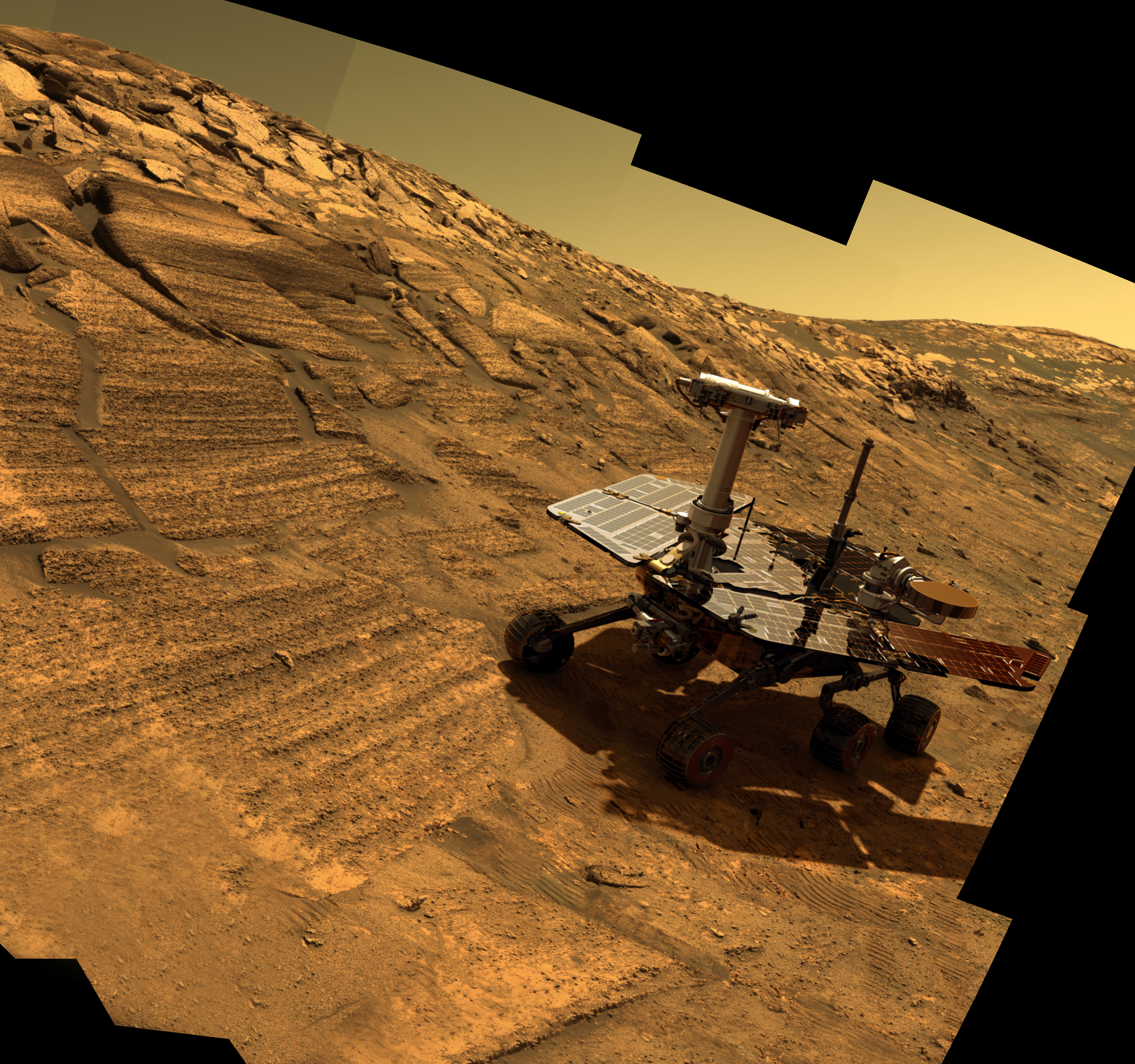
Artist generated view of Opportunity, in a real image taken by said rover of a crater

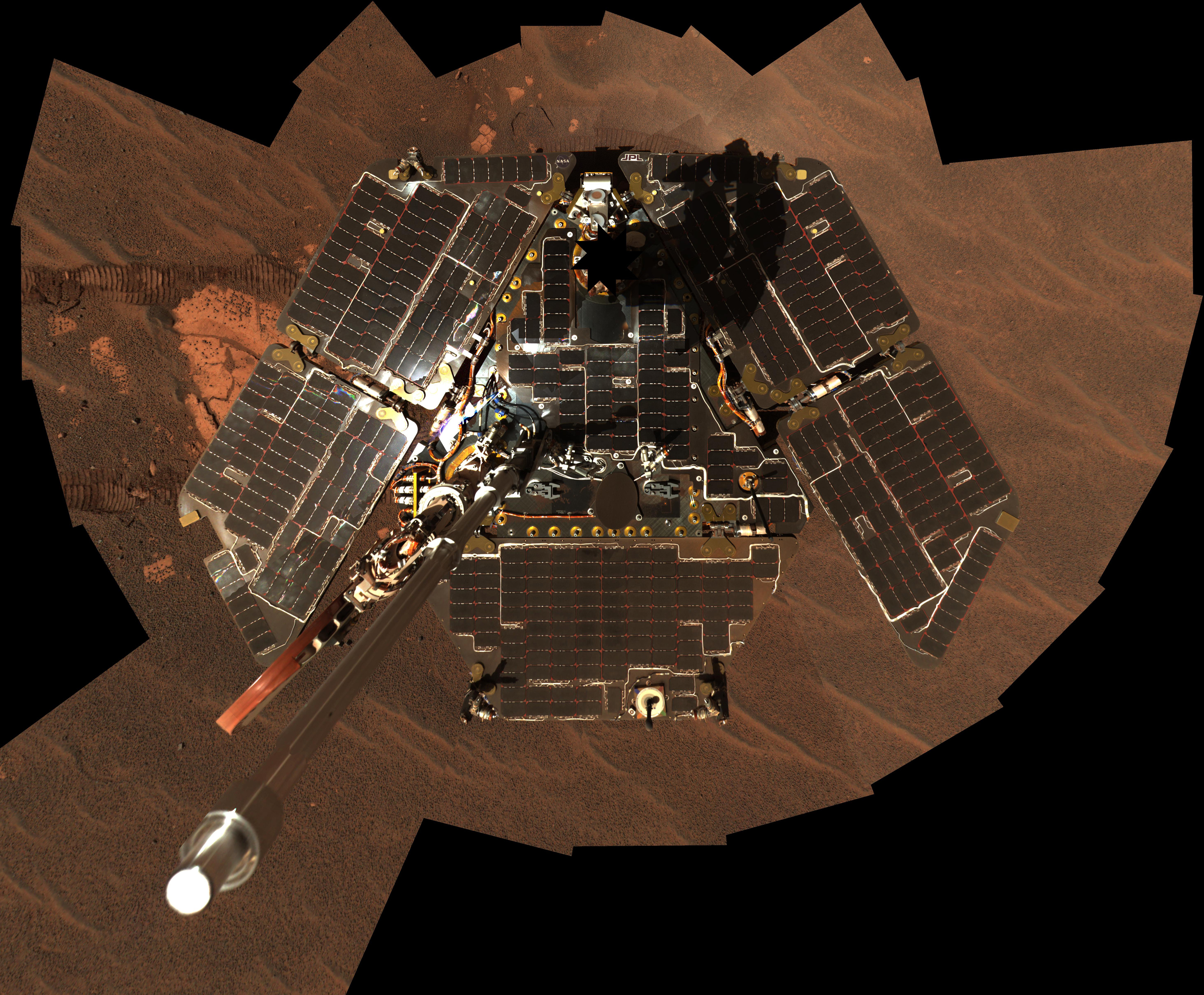
Selfie looking down on its panels, December 2004

Opportunity is a robotic rover that was active on the planet Mars from 2004 to 2018. Launched on July 7, 2003, Opportunity landed on Mars' Meridiani Planum on January 25, 2004, at 05:05 Ground UTC (about 13:15 Mars local time), three weeks after its twin Spirit (MER-A), also part of NASA's Mars Exploration Rover Mission, touched down on the other side of the planet. While Spirit became immobile in 2009, and ceased communications in 2010, Opportunity exceeded its planned 90 sol (Martian days) duration of activity by 14 years 46 days (in Earth time). Opportunity continued to move, gather scientific observations, and report back to Earth until 2018. What follows is a summary of events during its continuing mission.

Opportunity started in Eagle crater in 2004, literally landing inside on the crater basin, then it travelled outward making its way to Endurance crater. After this it went to Victoria crater, all the way making many panoramas, measurements, studying rocks, and smaller craters, even what are thought to be meteorites. It then traveled to Endeavour crater, where it has been making its way south along the Western rim. On June 10, 2018, contact was lost when a global dust storm blotted out the Sun, thus depriving the rover of enough power for operations, and communication with Earth. In September 2018, after the storm subsided, NASA began making various efforts to contact, and listen to the rover if it endured the storm. NASA officials declared that the Opportunity mission was complete on February 13, 2019, after it failed to wake from over 1,000 repeated signals sent since August 2018.

== Mission timeline ==
=== Summary ===
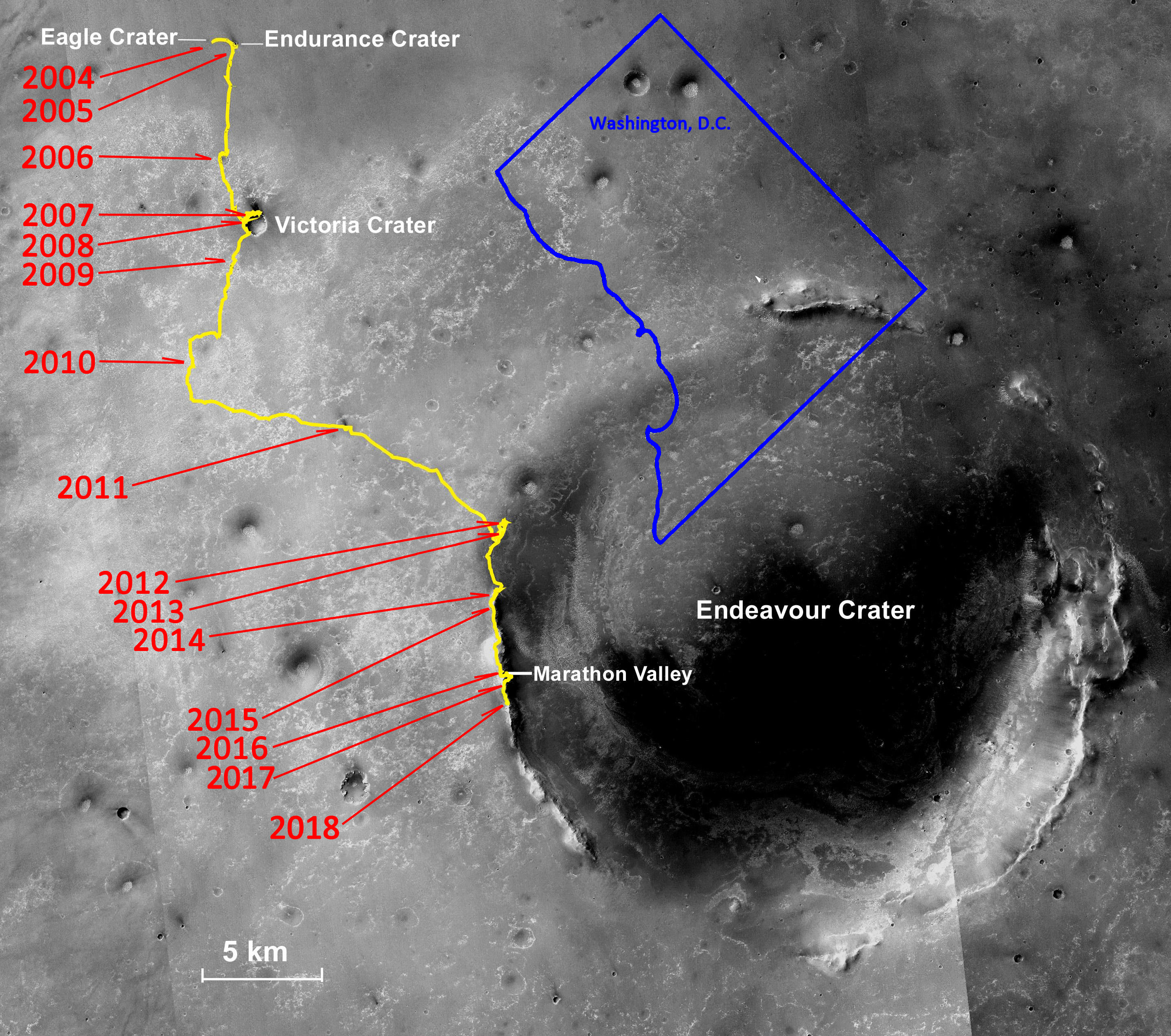
Lifetime progress map with Washington, D.C. overlay for size and distance comparison.

==== Landing site context ====
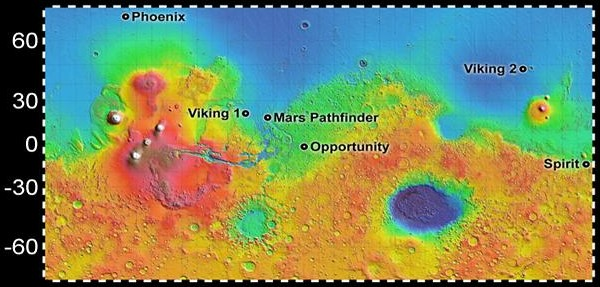
Overall location of Opportunity on the planet Mars

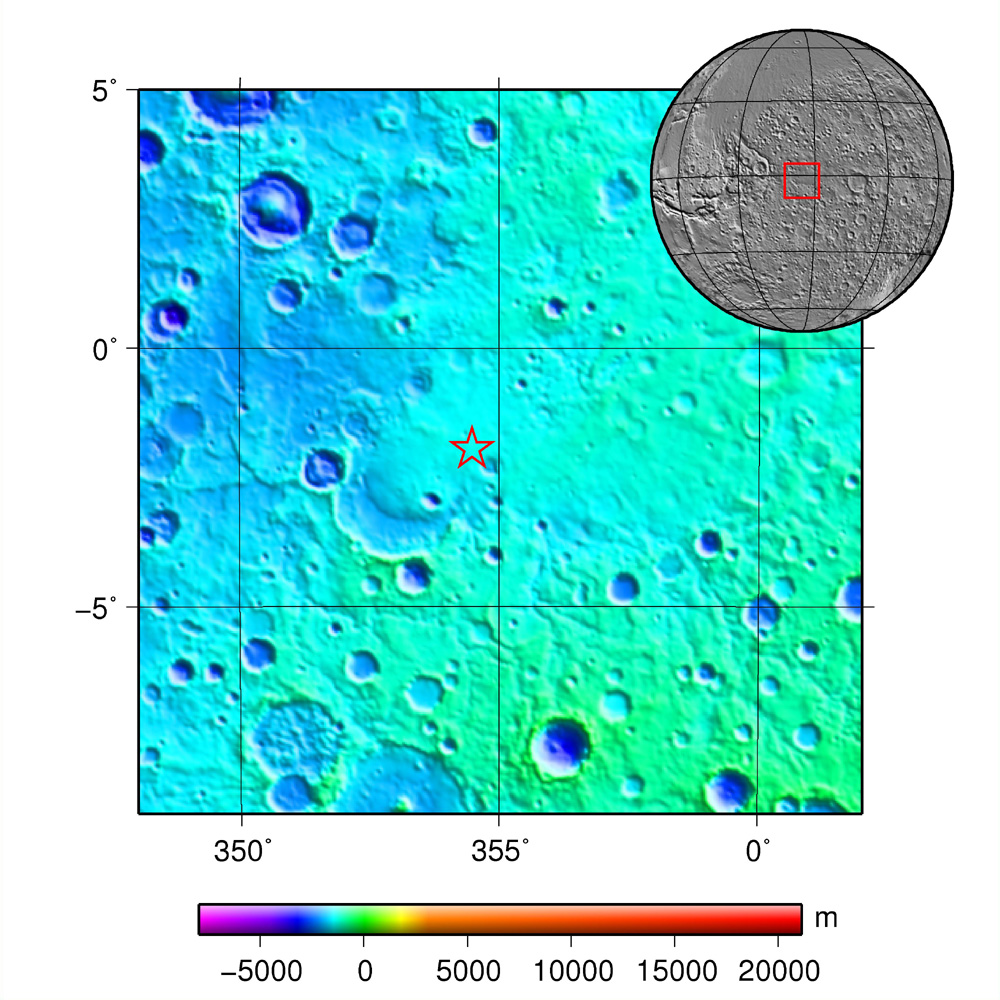
Opportunity's landing site (denoted with a star)

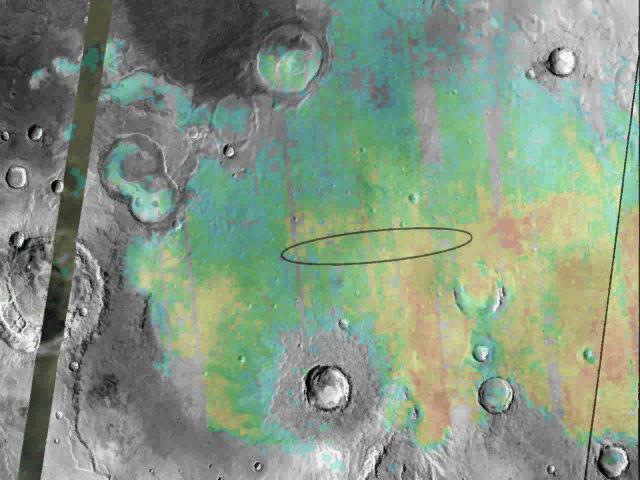
Landing ellipse of Opportunity; with Bopulu on the left, and the Endeavour, Iazu, unnamed on the right, below the ellipse

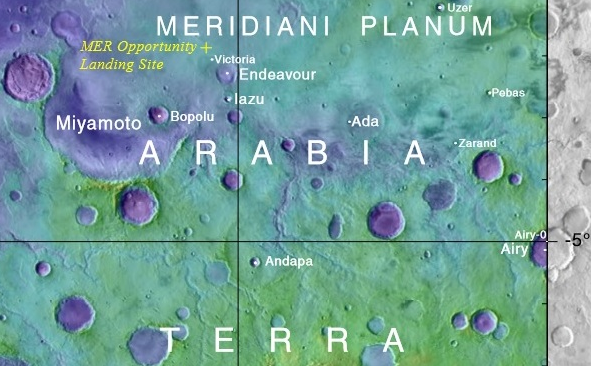
Annotated elevation map of Opportunity landing site and some surrounding craters including Endeavour and Miyamato

=== 2004 ===
==== Landing site: "Eagle" crater ====
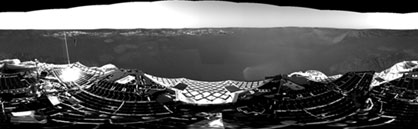
Opportunity's first 360-degree grayscale panorama, taken by the navcam on Sol 1 of the mission, showing interior of Eagle crater at Meridiani Planum

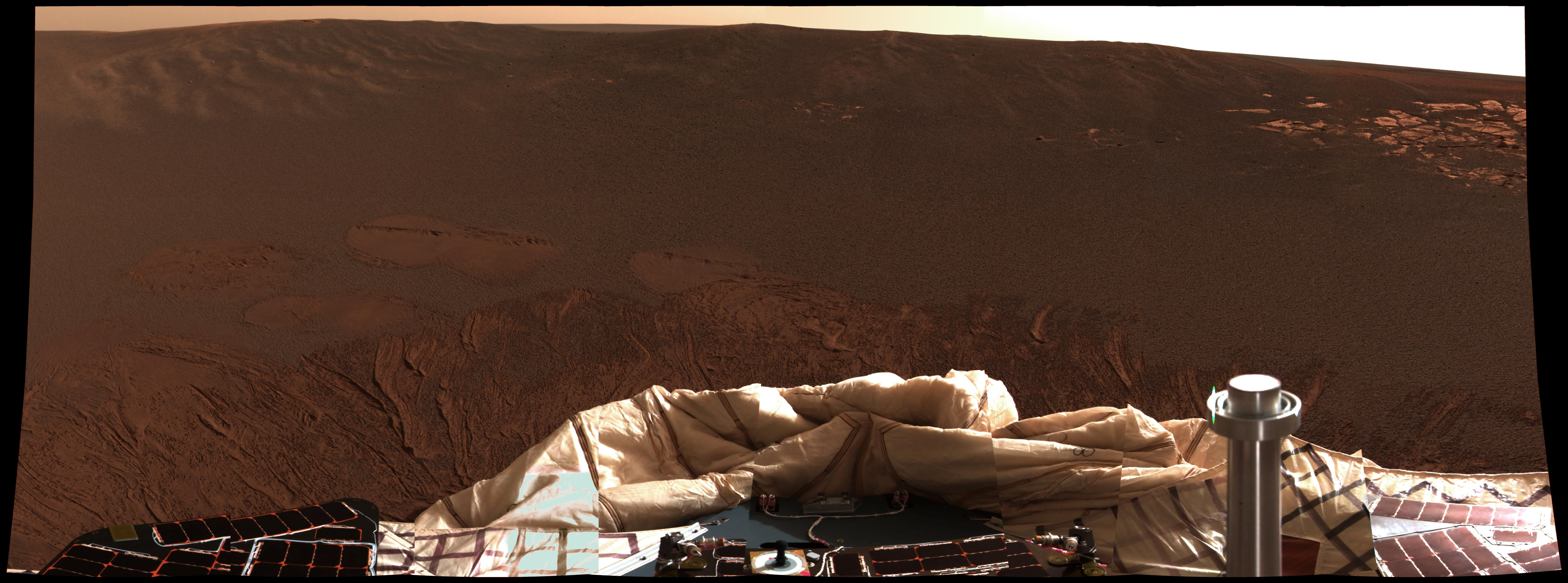
First color panorama taken by Opportunity, showing the Martian landscape at Meridiani Planum

Opportunity landed in Meridiani Planum at 1.95°S 354.47°E, about 25 kilometers (16 mi) downrange (east) of its intended target on January 25, 2004, at 05:05. Although Meridiani is a flat plain, without the rock fields seen at previous Mars landing sites, Opportunity rolled into an impact crater 22 meters in diameter, with the rim of the crater approximately 10 meters (33 ft) from the rover. NASA Scientists were so excited about landing in a crater that they called the landing a "hole in one"; however, they were not aiming for the crater (and did not know it existed). Later, the crater was named Eagle crater and the landing site designated "Challenger Memorial Station". This was the darkest landing site ever visited by a spacecraft on Mars. It would be two weeks before Opportunity was able to get a better look at its surroundings.

Scientists were intrigued by the abundance of rock outcrops dispersed throughout the crater, as well as the crater's soil, which appeared to be a mixture of coarse gray grains, and fine reddish grains. This sweeping look at the unusual rock outcropping near Opportunity was captured by the rover's panoramic camera. Scientists believe the seemingly layered rocks are either volcanic ash deposits or sediments laid down by wind or water. It was given the name Opportunity Ledge.

Geologists said that the layers—some no thicker than a finger—indicate the rocks likely originated either from sediments carried by water or wind, or from falling volcanic ash. "We should be able to distinguish between those two hypotheses", said Dr. Andrew Knoll of Harvard University, Cambridge, a member of the science team for Opportunity, and its twin, Spirit. If the rocks are sedimentary, water is a more likely source than wind, he said.

These layered rocks measure only 10 centimeters (3.9 in) tall, and are thought to be either volcanic ash deposits or sediments carried by water or wind. The layers are very thin measuring just a few millimeters thick in some cases.

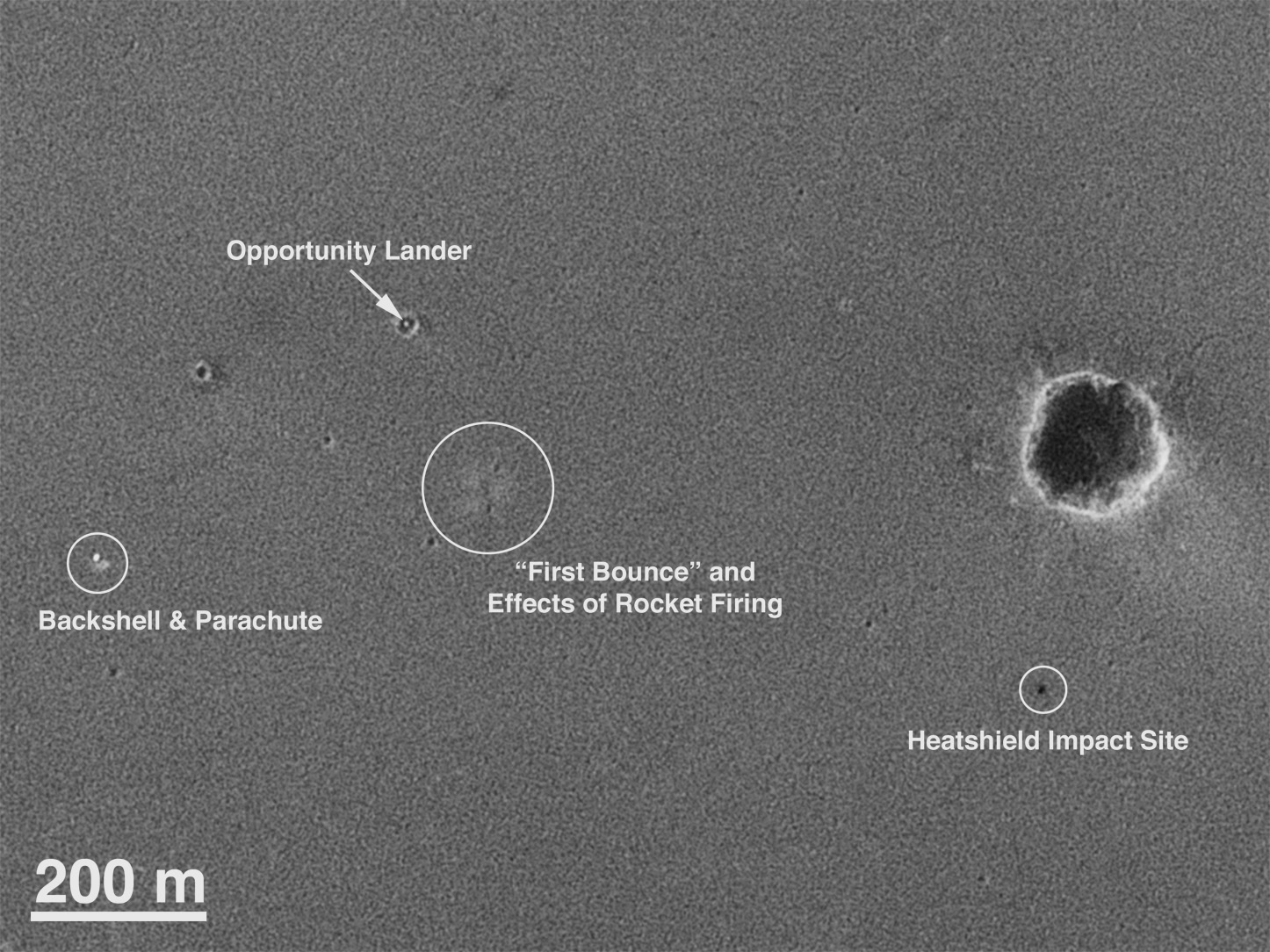
Mars Global Surveyor orbiter's photograph of landing site showing "hole in one." (See also: simulation of Opportunity's trajectory on arrival at Mars in January 2004).

==== "Opportunity Ledge" outcroppings ====
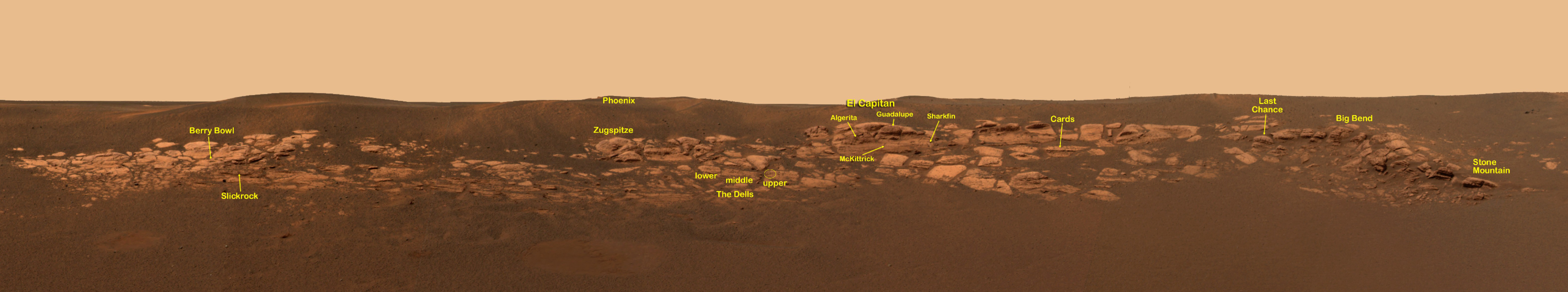
This panoramic image, showing the locations of rocks and outcrops at the northwestern rim of Eagle crater, was taken with Opportunity still on its lander. These layered rocks measure only 10 centimetres (3.9 inches) tall and were thought at that time to be either volcanic ash deposits or sediments carried by water or wind. See also a version of this image without annotations. (Courtesy NASA/JPL-Caltech)

On Sol 15, Opportunity took a close up of the rock "Stone Mountain" in the outcrop area of the crater, raising speculation that the rock consisted of very fine grain or dust, in contrast to Earth sandstone, which is compacted sand with rather large grains. The weathering agent eroding away layers of this rock seemed to be visible as dark spots.

A picture received on February 10 (taken on Sol 16) showed that the thin layers in the bedrock converge, and diverge at low angles, suggesting that some "moving current" such as volcanic flow, wind, or water formed these rocks. The discovery of these layers was significant for scientists who had planned this mission to test the "water hypothesis" rigorously.

==== El Capitan outcropping ====
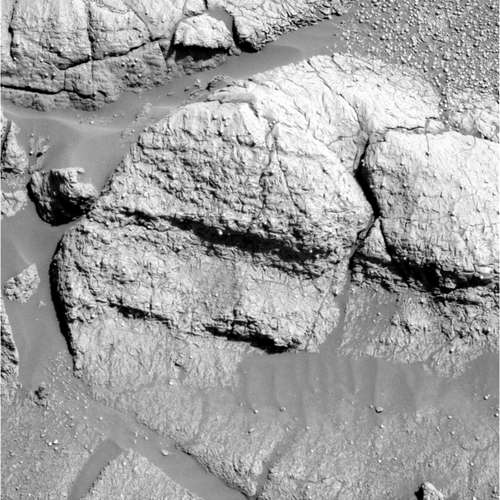
Section of El Capitan.

On February 19 the survey of "Opportunity Ledge" was declared successful. A specific target in the outcrop (dubbed "El Capitan"), whose upper and lower portions appeared to differ in layering and weathering characteristics, was selected for further investigation. El Capitan, about 10 centimeters (3.9 in) high, was named after a mountain in Texas. Opportunity reached El Capitan on Sol 27, and took a first picture of the rocks with its panoramic camera.

On Sol 30, Opportunity used its Rock Abrasion Tool (RAT) for the first time to investigate the rocks around El Capitan. The image on the right-hand side shows a close-up view taken after the drilling and cleaning process was complete. Due to chance, two spherules were also cut partially, and seem to show scratches, and other marks made by the diamond-crusted grind tool. The black areas are artifacts of the imaging process, when parts of the picture are missing.

During a press conference on Sol 36, March 2, 2004, mission scientists discussed their conclusions about the bedrock and the evidence for the presence of liquid water during their formation. They presented the following reasoning to explain the small, elongated voids in the rock visible on the surface, and after grinding into it (see last two images below).

These voids are consistent with features known to geologists as "vugs". These are formed when crystals form inside a rock matrix and are later removed through erosive processes, leaving behind voids. Some of the features in this picture are "disk-like", which is consistent with certain types of crystals, notably sulfate minerals.

Additionally, mission members presented first data from the MIMOS II Mössbauer spectrometer taken at the bedrock site. The iron spectrum obtained from the rock El Capitan shows strong evidence for the mineral jarosite. This mineral contains hydroxide ions, which indicates the presence of water when the minerals were formed. Mini-TES data from the same rock showed that it consists of a considerable amount of sulfates.

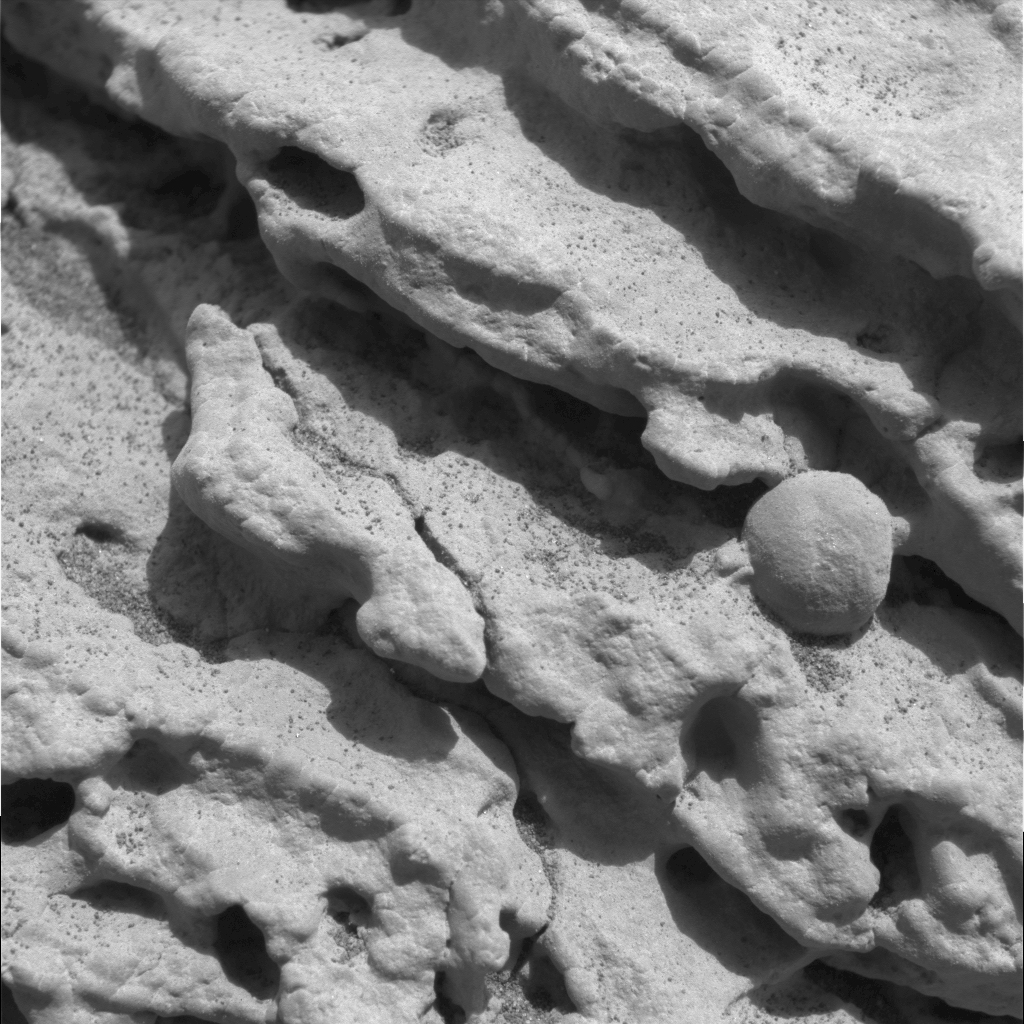
Close up of a rock outcrop.

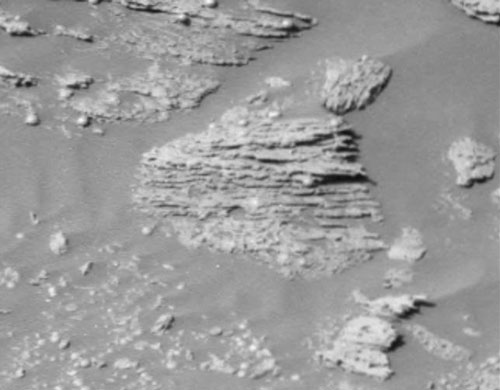
Thin rock layers, not all parallel to each other.

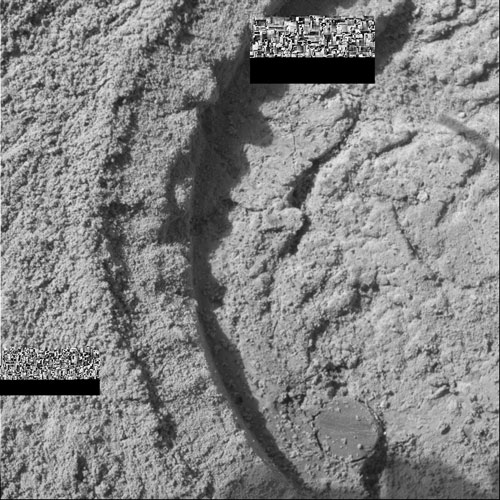
Section of hole created by RAT.

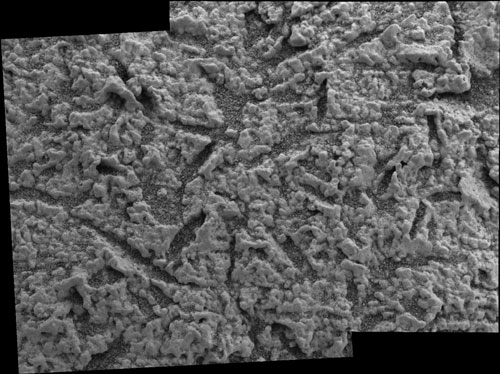
Voids or "vugs" inside the rock.

==== Analyzing soil through digging a trench ====
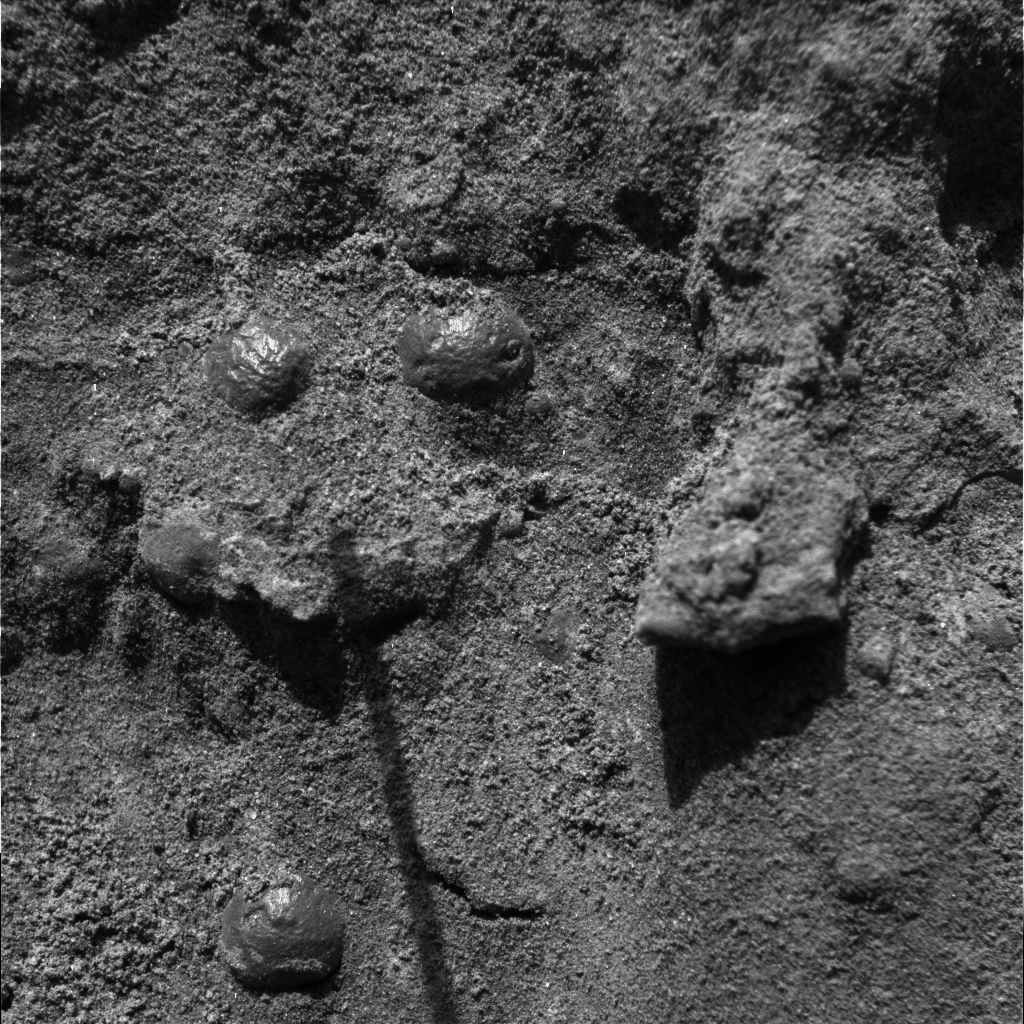
This image, taken by the microscopic imager, reveals shiny, spherical objects embedded within the trench wall

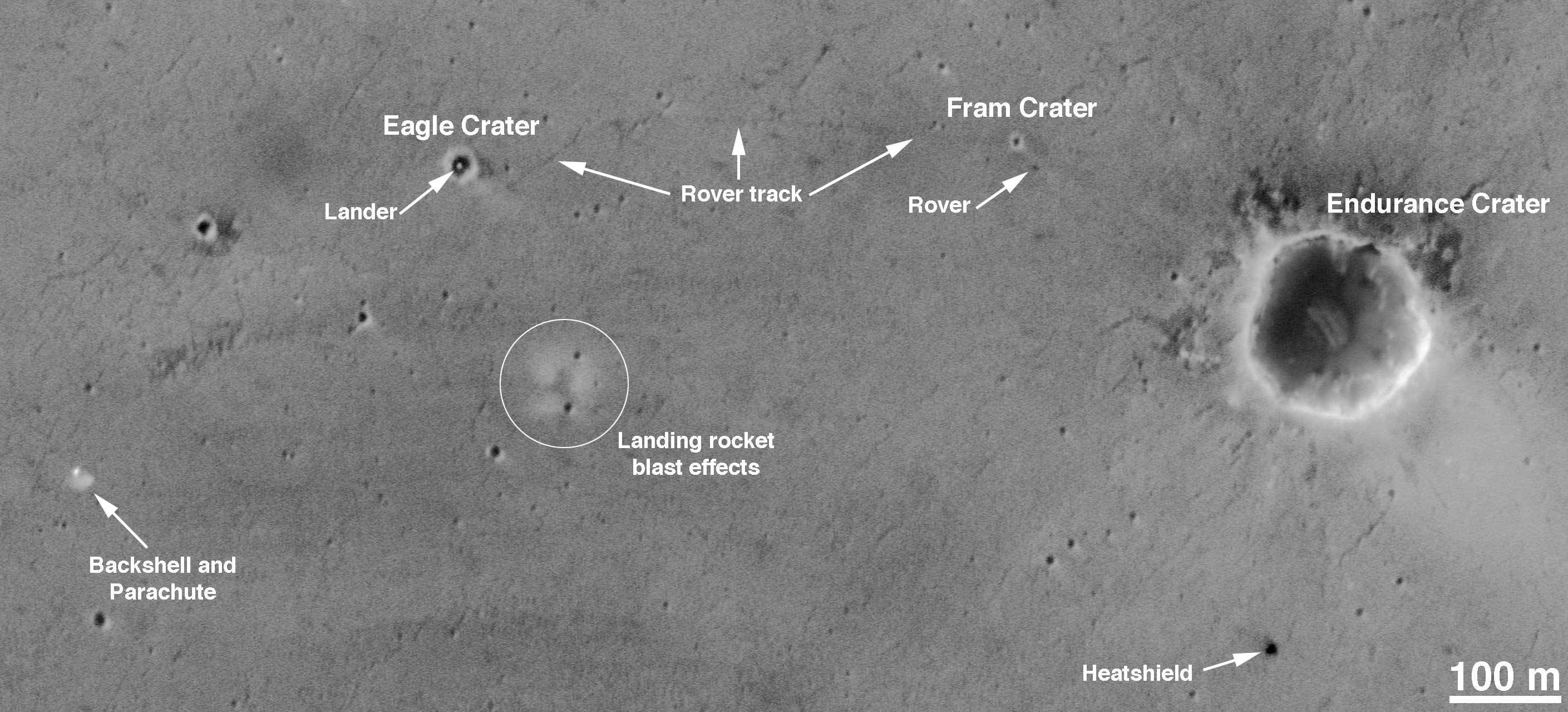
Mapping out of various aspects of Opportunity's mission up to April 2004 as seen from orbit

In order to analyze the soil inside the crater it was decided to try to dig a trench with the wheels. The rover alternately pushed soil forward and backward out of the trench with its right front wheel while other wheels held the rover in place. The rover turned slightly between bouts of digging to widen the hole. The process lasted 22 minutes. The resulting trench — the first dug by either Mars Exploration Rover — is about 50 centimeters (20 in) long and 10 centimeters (3.9 in) deep. Two features that caught scientists' attention were the clotty texture of soil in the upper wall of the trench, and the brightness of soil on the trench floor.

By inspecting the sides and floor of a hole it dug, Opportunity found some things it had not imaged beforehand, including shiny round pebbles and soil so fine-grained that the rover's microscope could not make out individual particles.

What is underneath is different from what is at the immediate surface. The soils consist of fine-grained basaltic sand and a surface lag of hematite-rich spherules, spherule fragments, and other granules. Underlying the thin soil layer, are flat-lying sedimentary rocks. These rocks are finely laminated, are rich in sulfur, and contain abundant sulfate salts.

==== Endurance crater ====
On sol 84 April 20, 2004, the rover reached Endurance crater, which was known to have many layers of rocks. In May the rover circumnavigated the crater, and made observations with Mini-TES and the panoramic camera. The rock "Lion Stone" was investigated on Sol 107 and found to be similar in composition to the layers found in Eagle crater.

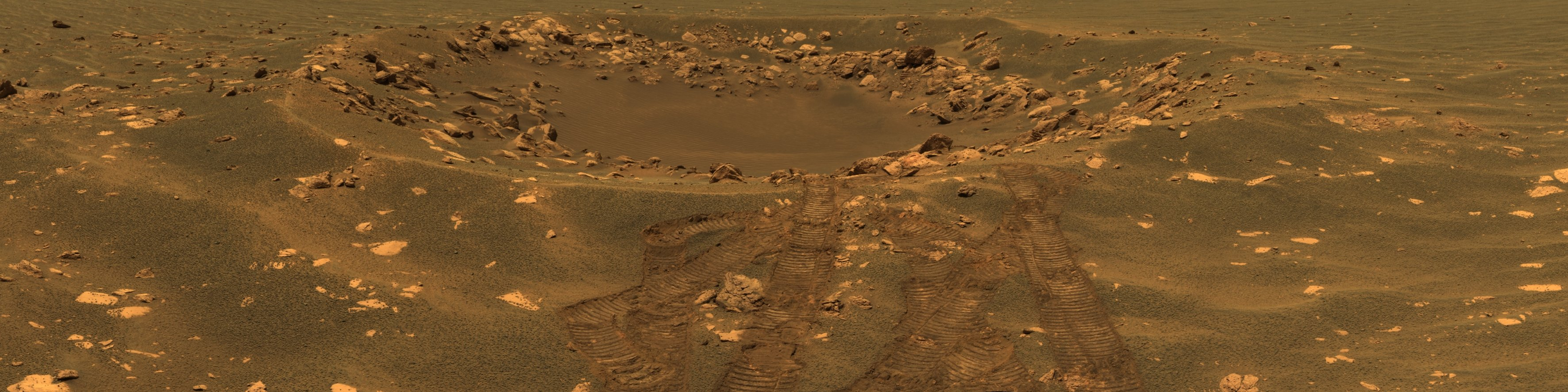
Fram crater, a small ~8 metres (26 ft) diameter impact crater near Endurance crater on Sol 88, April 24, 2004

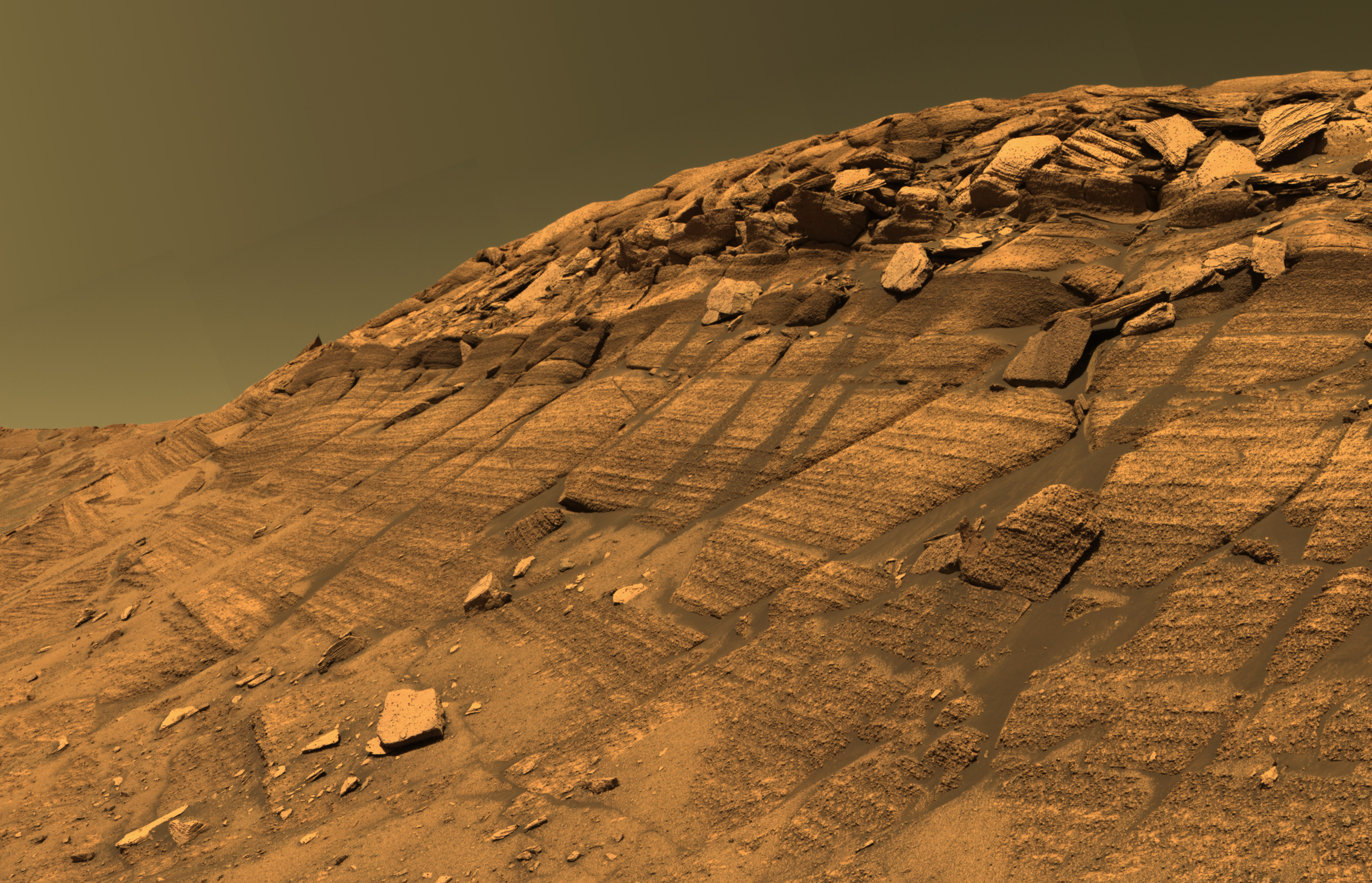
The view of Burns Cliff inside Endurance Crater.

On sol 127 June 4, 2004 mission members announced their intention to drive Opportunity into Endurance, even if it should turn out to be impossible to get back out, targeting the various rock layers that were identified in the pictures from the crater rim. "This is a crucial and careful decision for the Mars Exploration Rovers' extended mission", said Dr. Edward Weiler, NASA's associate administrator for space science. Steve Squyres, principal investigator from Cornell University said: "Answering the question of what came before the evaporites is the most significant scientific issue we can address with Opportunity at this time."

A first drive into the crater was executed on sol 131 June 8, and Opportunity backed out again the same day. It was found that the angle of the surface was well inside the safety margin (about 18 degrees), and the full excursion toward the rock layer of interest was started. During Sols 134 (June 12), 135, and 137 the rover drove deeper and deeper into the crater. Although some wheel slip was observed, driving was discovered to be possible even at slope angles up to 30 degrees.

Wispy clouds, similar to Earth's cirrus clouds, were spotted.

Opportunity spent roughly 180 sols inside the crater, before backing out of it again in mid December 2004, on Sol 315. Scientific results of the sedimentary geology of the crater were published in the journal Earth and Planetary Science Letters In December 2004, daily power output varied from 840 watt-hours while inside Endurance Crater to 730 watt-hours on the plains.

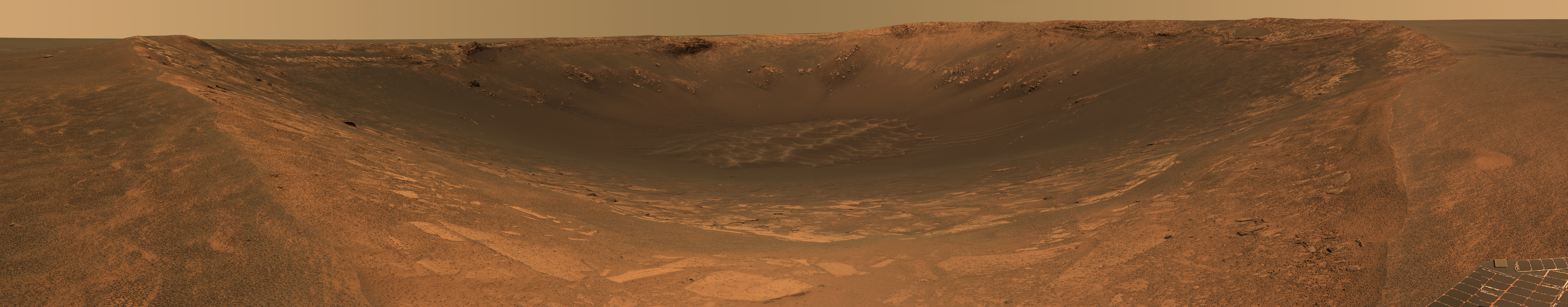
Endurance Crater panorama (approximate true color)

=== 2005 ===
==== Heat Shield Rock and stuck in sand ====
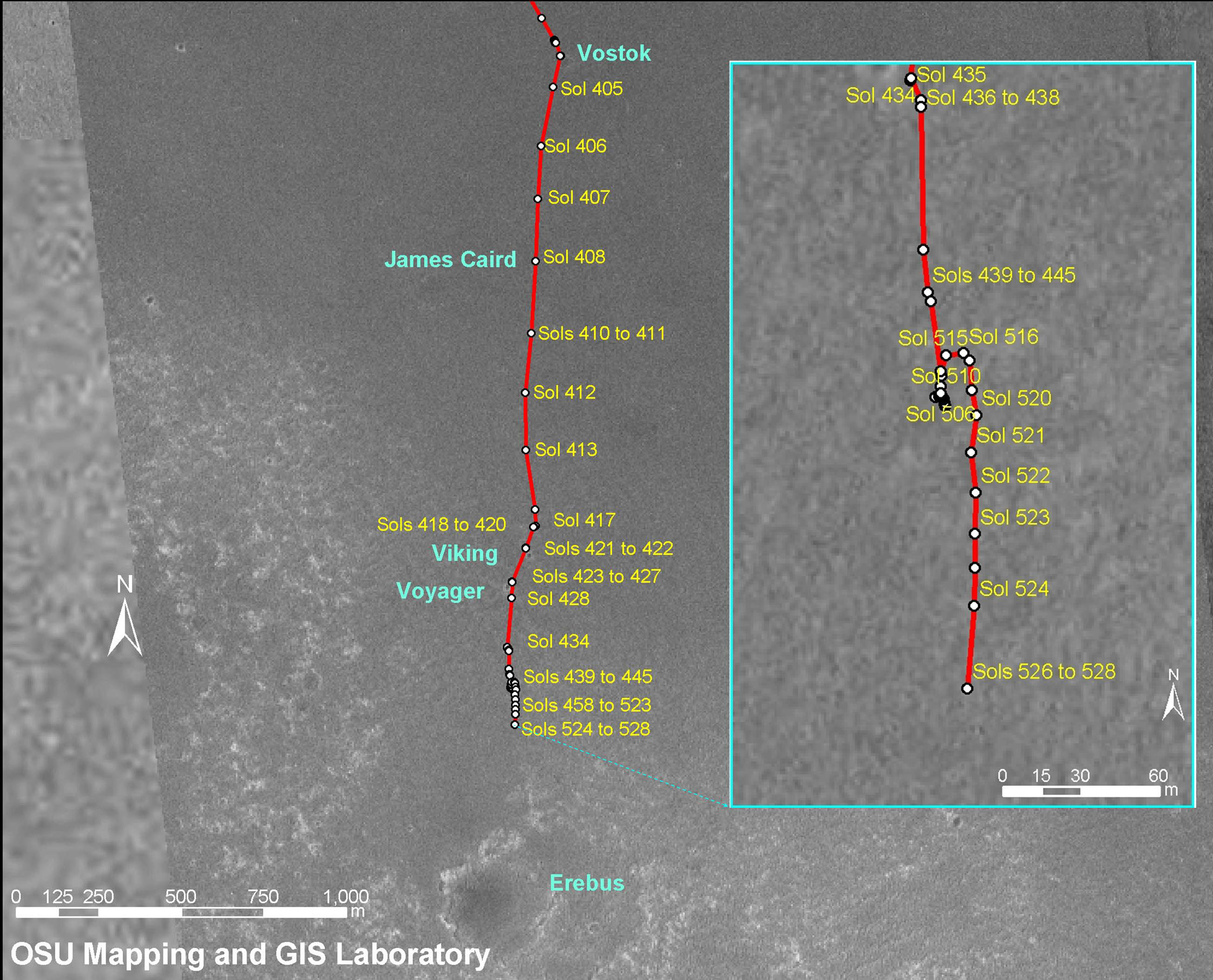
Traverse map released July 2005, from about Sol 405 to Sol 528

After exiting Endurance crater, in January 2005 Opportunity was driven to examine its own discarded heat shield. While in the vicinity of the heat shield, on Sol 345 it came upon an object that was immediately suspected and soon confirmed to be a meteorite. The meteorite was promptly named Heat Shield Rock, and is the first meteorite identified on another planet (although the Bench Crater and Hadley Rille meteorites were found earlier on the Moon).

After about 25 sols of observations Opportunity headed south for a crater named Argo, nearly 300 meters (980 ft) from the heat shield.

The rover was commanded to dig another trench on the vast plains of Meridiani Planum, on Sol 366, and observations continued until Sol 373 (February 10, 2005). The rover then passed the craters "Alvin" and "Jason", and by Sol 387, approached a "crater triplet" on its way to Vostok Crater. Along the way, Opportunity set a distance record for one-day travel by either rover: 177.5 meters (582 ft), on sol 381 February 19, 2005. On Sol 387 (February 26, 2005), the rover approached one of the three craters, dubbed Naturaliste. A rock target named "Normandy" was chosen for investigation on Sol 392, and Opportunity remained there until Sol 395.

Opportunity reached Vostok Crater on Sol 399, finding it mostly filled with sand and lined by outcrops. It was then ordered south into what has been called "etched terrain", to search for more bedrock.

On March 20, 2005 (Sol 410) Opportunity set a new Martian record for the longest single day drive when it drove 220 meters (720 ft).

By Sol 415, Opportunity stopped by some soil ripples to investigate the differences between soil in the trough of a ripple and its crest. Various soil targets included "Mobarak" in the trough, named in honor of Persian New Year, and "Norooz" and "Mayberooz" on the crest. By Sol 421, the rover left the ripple for "Viking" crater.

Between April 26, 2005 (Sol 446) and June 4, 2005 (Sol 484) Opportunity was stuck in a Martian sand dune. The problem began on sol 445 (April 26, 2005) when Opportunity inadvertently dug itself into a sand dune: Mission scientists reported that images indicated all four corner wheels were dug in by more than a wheel radius, just as the rover attempted to climb over a dune about 30 centimeters (12 in) tall. The sand dune was designated "Purgatory Dune" by mission planners.

The rover's condition was simulated on Earth prior to any attempt to move, out of concern that the rover might become permanently immobilized. After various simulations intended to mimic the properties and behavior of Martian sand were completed, the rover executed its first wheel movements on sol 461 (May 13, 2005), intentionally advancing only a few centimeters, after which mission members evaluated the results.

During Sol 465 and 466 more drive commands were executed, and with each trial the rover moved another couple of centimeters. At the end of each movement, panoramic images were acquired to investigate the atmosphere and the surrounding dune field. The sand dune escape maneuver was successfully completed on sol 483 (June 4, 2005), and all six wheels of Opportunity were on firmer ground. After studying "Purgatory" from Sol 498 to Sol 510, Opportunity proceeded southward toward "Erebus crater".

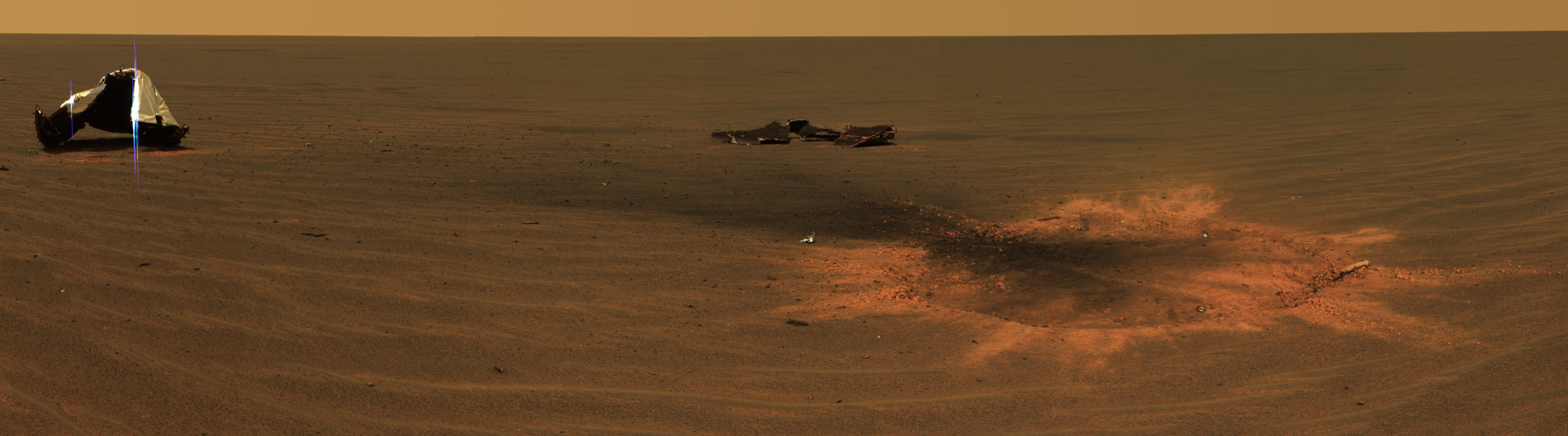
Area around the heat shield, including the resulting shield impact crater. The heat shield was released before the rover landed and impacted the surface on its own
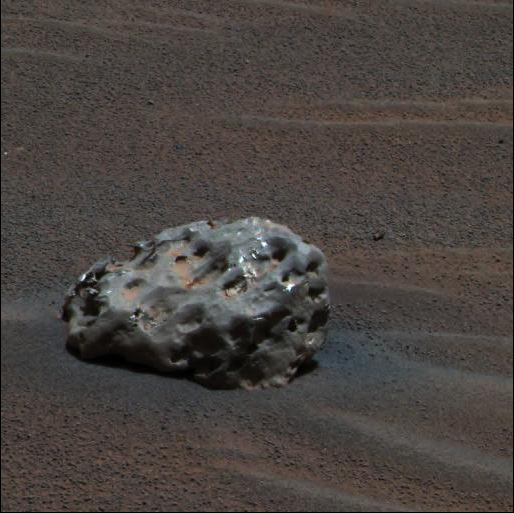
Heat Shield Rock was the first meteorite ever identified on another planet.

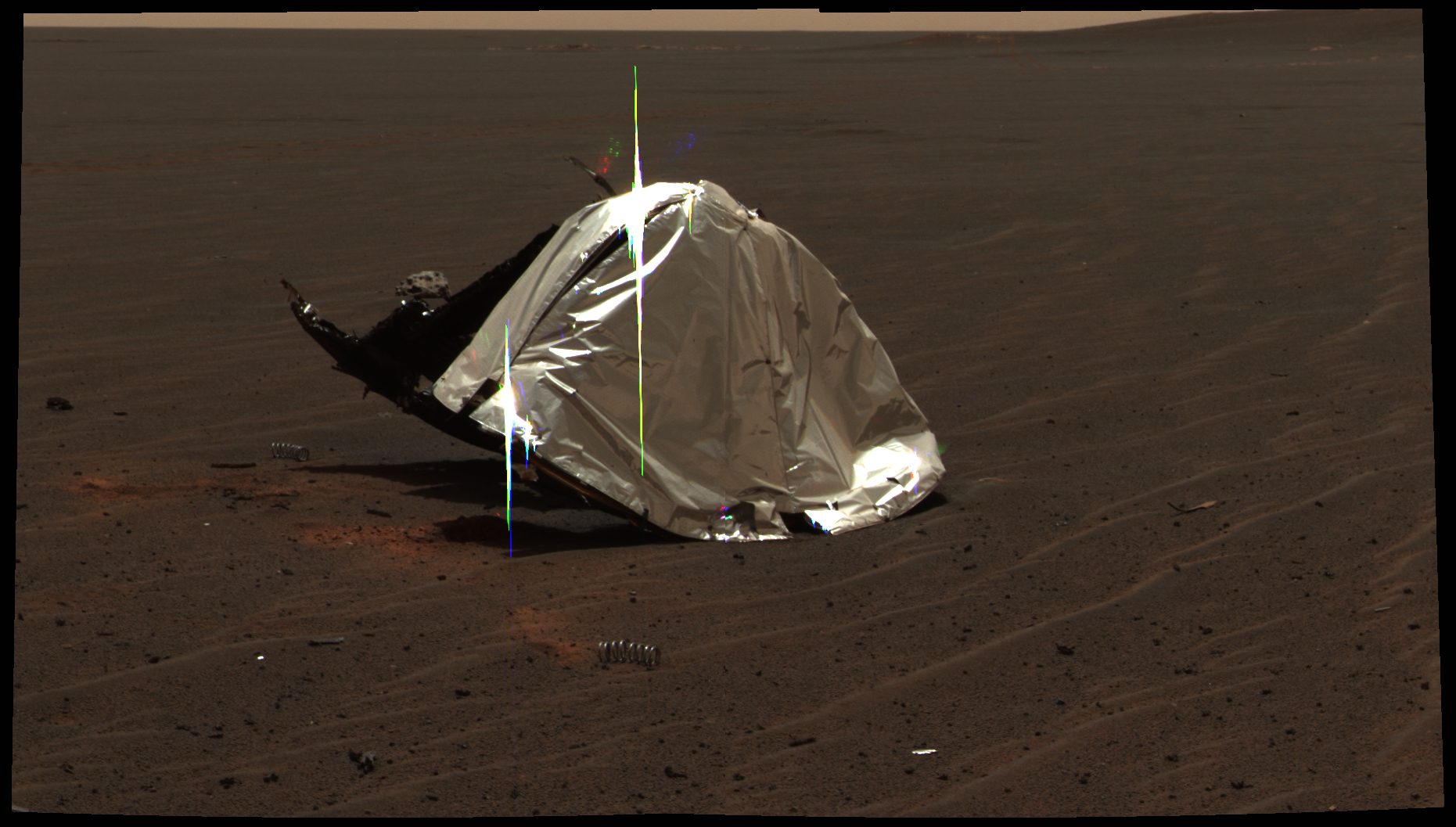
Heat shield, with Heat Shield Rock just above and to the left in the background.

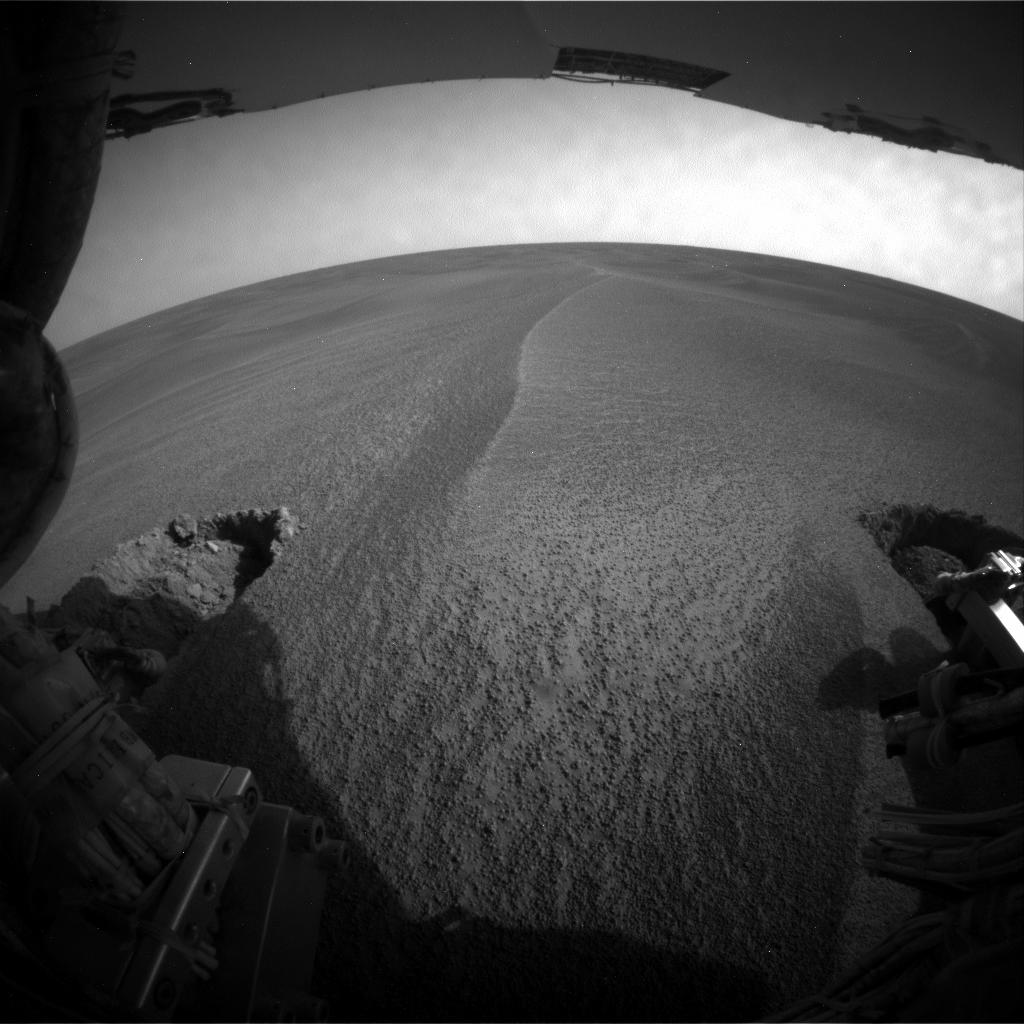
Dug in back wheels on Sol 468.

==== Erebus crater ====
Opportunity studied Erebus crater, a large, shallow, partially buried crater and a stopover on the way south toward Victoria crater, between October 2005 and March 2006.

New programming to measure the percentage of slip in the wheels was successful in preventing the rover from getting stuck again. Another "Purgatory"-like incident was averted on Sol 603, when onboard slip check software stopped a drive after slip reached 44.5%. It proceeded over many ripples and 'half-pipes', taking photographs after each sol's journey.

On Sol 631 (November 3, 2005) Opportunity woke up in the midst of a mild dust storm that lasted three days. The rover was able to drive in self-protective auto-mode during the storm, but it could not take any post-drive images. Less than three weeks later, another cleaning event cleared the dust off of the solar array so as to produce around 720 watt-hours (80% of max). On Sol 658 (December 1, 2005), it was discovered the motor used to stow the robotic arm for travel was stalling. This problem took nearly two weeks to fix. Initially, the arm was stowed only for travel and was extended at night to prevent the arm from getting stuck. However, further stalling convinced engineers to leave the arm extended at all times to avoid the arm becoming stuck in the stowed position and becoming unusable.

Opportunity observed numerous outcroppings around Erebus crater.

It also collaborated with ESA's Mars Express by using the miniature Thermal Emission Spectrometer and panoramic camera (Pancam), and took images of a transit across the Sun by Phobos. On Sol 766 (March 22, 2006), Opportunity began the journey to its next destination, Victoria crater, which it would reach in September 2006 (Sol 951). It would stay at Victoria crater until August 2008 (Sol 1630–1634).

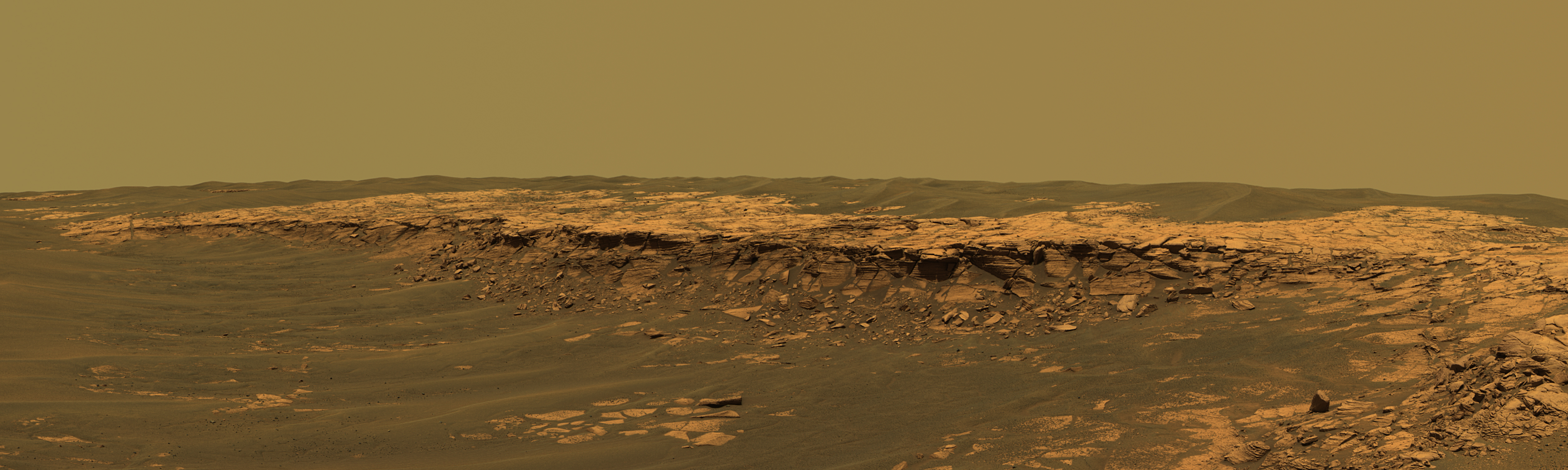
An outcrop named "Payson", on the western edge of Erebus.
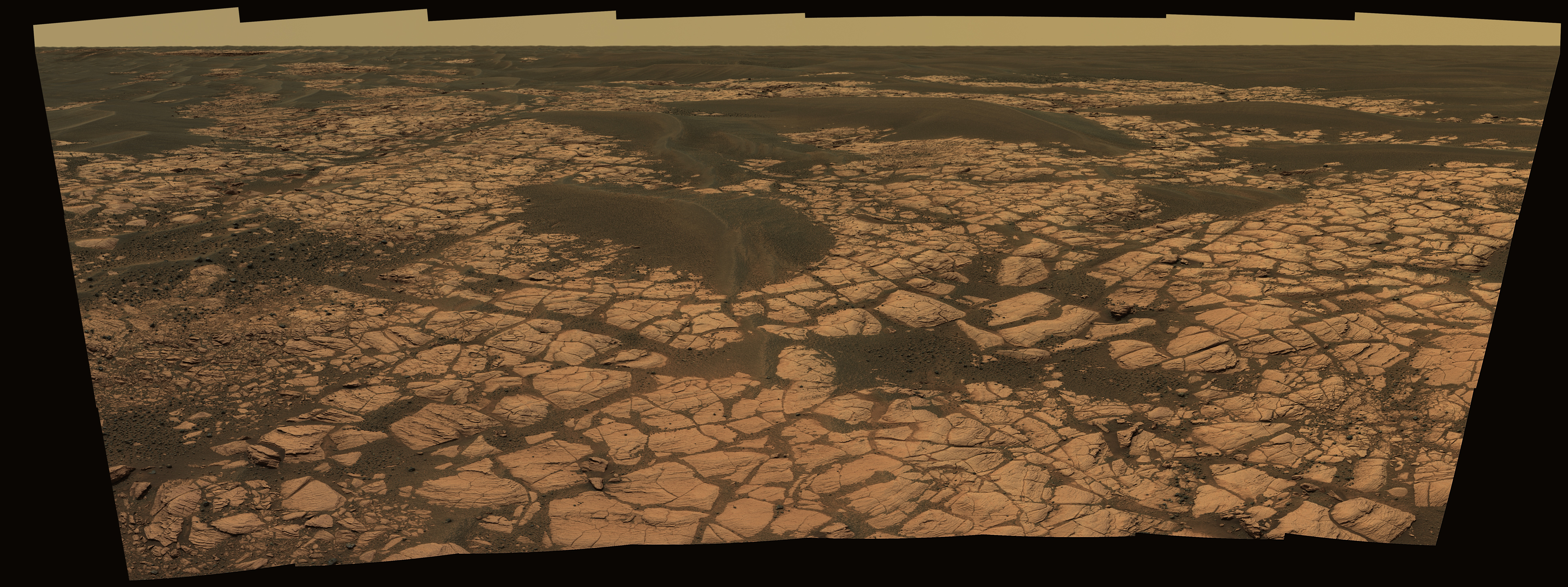
Erebus Olympia rock outcrop in Erebus

==== Shoulder troubles ====
The "shoulder" joint of Opportunity's arm has had troubles since Sol 2 (January 25, 2004), the rover's second day on Mars. Engineers discovered that the heater on the shoulder azimuth joint, which controls side-to-side motion of the robotic arm, was stuck in the "on" position. Closer investigation revealed that the on-off switch had probably failed during assembly, test, and launch operations on Earth. Fortunately for Opportunity, the rover was equipped with a built-in safety mechanism called a "T-stat box" (thermostatic switch) that provided protection against overheating. When the shoulder azimuth joint, also known as Joint 1, got too hot, the T-stat switch automatically opened and temporarily disabled the heater. When the joint got cold again, the T-stat closed. As a result, the heater stayed on all night but not all day.

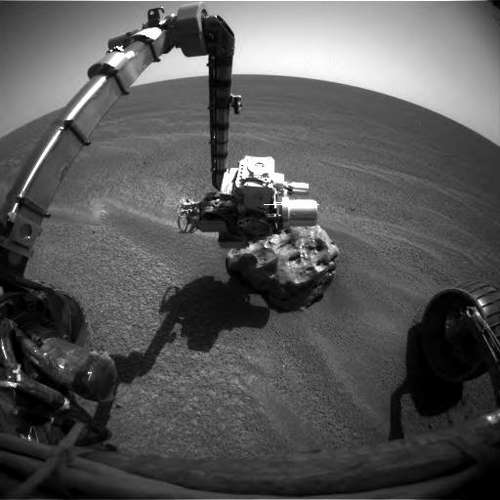
Opportunity extends its arm to analyze Heat Shield Rock on Sol 349 (early 2005).

The safety mechanism worked until Opportunity approached the first winter on Mars. As the Sun began to retreat lower in the sky and solar power levels dropped, it became clear that Opportunity would not be able to keep the batteries charged with a heater draining power all night long. On Sol 121 (May 28, 2004), rover operators began using a procedure known as "deep sleep," during which Opportunity disconnected the batteries at night. Deep sleep prevented the stuck heater (and everything else on the rover except the clock and the battery heaters) from drawing power. When the Sun came up the next morning and sunlight began hitting the solar arrays, the batteries automatically reconnected, the robotic arm became operational, the shoulder joint warmed up, and the thermostatic switch opened, disabling the heater. As a result, the shoulder joint was extremely hot during the day and extremely cold at night. Such huge temperature swings, which tend to make electric motors wear out faster, were taking place every sol.

This strategy worked for Opportunity until Sol 654 (November 25, 2005), when the Joint-1 azimuth motor stalled because of increased electrical resistance. Rover operators responded by delivering higher-than-normal current to the motor. This approach also worked, though Joint 1 continued to stall periodically. Typically, the rover's handlers simply tried again the next sol and the joint worked. They determined that the Joint-1 motor stalls were most likely due to damage caused by the extreme temperature cycles the joint experienced during deep sleep. As a precaution, they started keeping the robotic arm out in front of the rover overnight, rather than stowing it underneath the rover deck, where it would be virtually unusable in the event of a Joint-1 motor failure. They stowed the arm only while driving and unstowed it immediately at the end of each drive.

=== 2006 ===
==== Journey to Victoria crater ====
On March 22, 2006 (Sol 760), Opportunity left Erebus crater and began the journey to Victoria crater, which it reached in September 2006 (Sol 951). It would stay at Victoria crater until August 2008 (Sol 1630–1634).

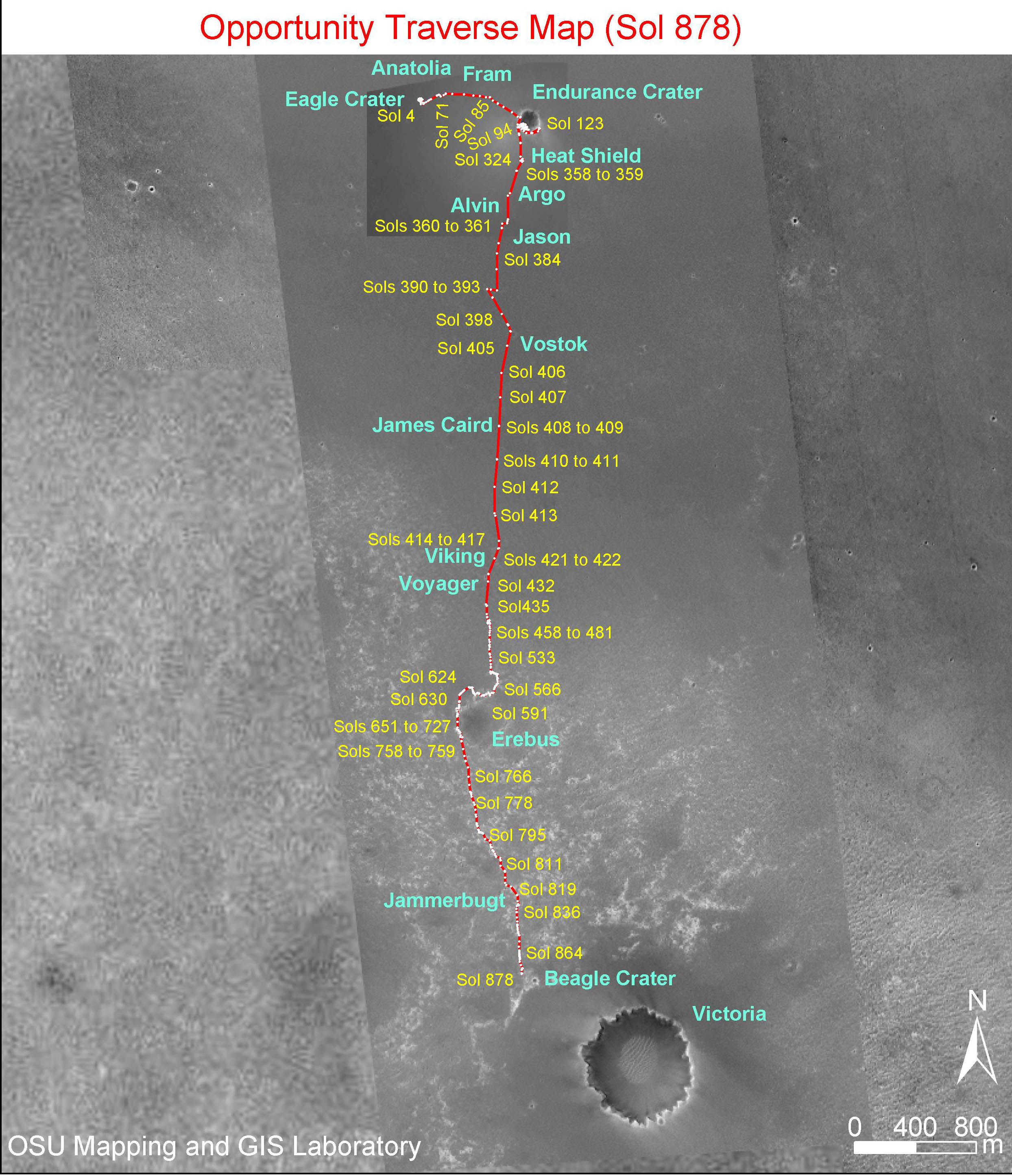
The rover's journey up to Sol 878 (July 2006) on the way to Victoria crater

==== Arrival at Victoria crater ====
Victoria crater is a massive impact crater approximately 7 kilometers (4.3 mi) from the original landing site. Victoria's diameter is six times larger than Endurance crater. Scientists believed that rock outcrops along the walls of Victoria would yield more information about the geologic history of Mars, if the rover survived long enough to investigate them.

On Sol 949 (September 26, 2006) Opportunity reached the rim of Victoria Crater and transmitted the first substantial views of Victoria, including the dune field at the bottom of the crater. The Mars Reconnaissance Orbiter photographed Opportunity at the rim of the crater.

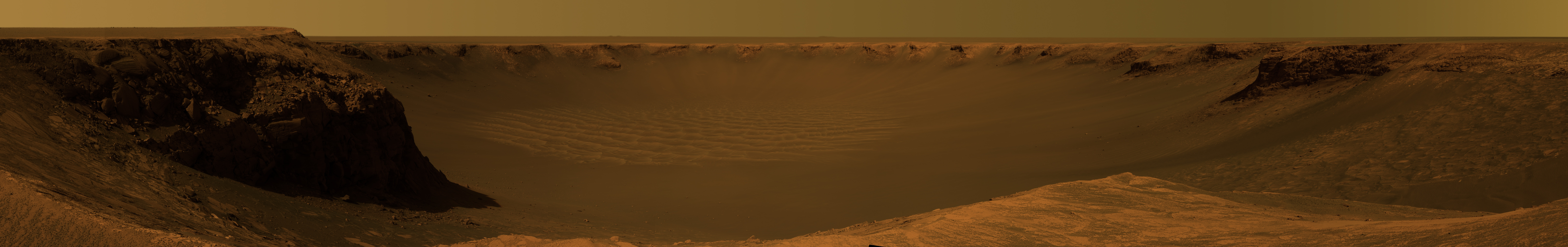
Victoria Crater as seen by the NASA Opportunity (MER-B) in 2006 using its Pancam instrument

=== 2007 ===
==== Moving around Victoria's rim ====
On January 4, 2007, both rovers received new flight software for their computers. The update was received just in time for the third anniversary of their landing. The new systems let the rovers decide whether to transmit an image, and whether to extend their arms to examine rocks, which would save much time for scientists, as they would not have to sift through hundreds of images to find the one they want, or examine the surroundings to decide to extend the arms and examine the rocks.

The APXS instrument was now for the first time used to determine the amount of the noble gas argon in the atmosphere of Mars. The same measurements were done on the other side of the planet by its rover twin Spirit. The purpose of this experiment was to determine the atmospheric mixing processes and track their changes with time.

In January the rover drove along the north side of the crater rim and imaged the cliffs from different viewpoints. While driving another meteorite was found: Santa Caterina. In March the Valley without peril was reached. This point had thought to be a possible entry point into the crater. But it turned out that this point had a too steep slope to drive carefully downside. After two additional cliffs where inspected it was decided to drive the whole way back to the point, where Opportunity arrived at Victoria crater. On June 15, 2007, the rover arrived at Duck Bay and prepared for entering the crater.

A series of cleaning events beginning on Sol 1149 (April 20, 2007) allowed Opportunity's solar energy production to rise to above 800 watt-hours per Sol. By Sol 1163 (May 4, 2007) the solar array current was peaking above 4.0 amperes, values not seen since Sol 16 (February 10, 2004). However, the advent of extensive dust storms on Mars starting in mid-2007 (in-line with Mars' six Earth-year global dust storm cycle), dropped energy production levels to 280 watt-hours per day.

==== Dust storms ====
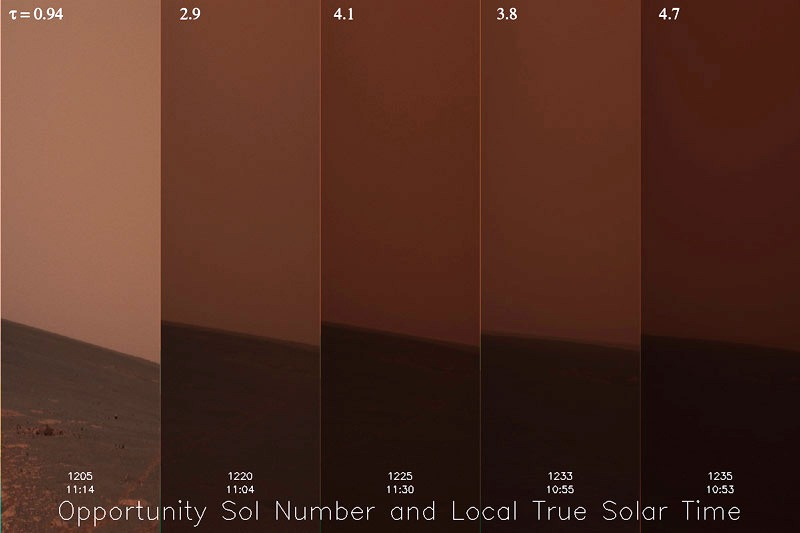
Time-lapse composite of the Martian horizon during Sols 1205 (0.94), 1220 (2.9), 1225 (4.1), 1233 (3.8), 1235 (4.7) shows how much sunlight the dust storms blocked; Tau of 4.7 indicates 99% blocked. credit:NASA/JPL-Caltech/Cornell.

Toward the end of June 2007, a series of dust storms began clouding the Martian atmosphere with dust. The storms intensified and by July 20, both Opportunity and Spirit were facing the real possibility of system failure due to lack of power. NASA released a statement to the press that said (in part) "We're rooting for our rovers to survive these storms, but they were never designed for conditions this intense". The key problem caused by the dust storm was a dramatic reduction in solar power. There was so much dust in the atmosphere that it blocked 99 percent of direct sunlight to the rover. The Spirit rover, on the other side of the planet, was getting slightly more sunlight than Opportunity.

Normally the solar arrays are able to generate about 700 watt-hours of energy per day. During the storms, the power generated is greatly reduced. If the rovers get less than 150 watt-hours per day they have to start draining their batteries. If the batteries run dry, key electrical elements are likely to fail due to the intense cold. On July 18, 2007, the rover's solar-panel only generated 128 watt-hours, the lowest level ever. NASA responded by commanding Opportunity to only communicate with Earth once every three days, the first time that this had happened since the start of the mission.

The dust storms continued through July and at the end of the month, NASA announced that the rovers, even under their very-low-power mode were barely getting enough energy to survive. If the temperature of the Opportunity's electronics module continued to drop, according to the announcement, "there is a real risk that Opportunity will trip a low-power fault. When a low-power fault is tripped, the rover's systems take the batteries off-line, putting the rover to sleep and then checking each sol to see if there is sufficient available energy to wake up and perform daily fault communications. If there is not sufficient energy, Opportunity will stay asleep. Depending on the weather conditions, Opportunity could stay asleep for days, weeks or even months, all the while trying to charge its batteries with whatever available sunlight there might be." It was quite possible that the rover would never wake up from a low-power fault.

By sol 1255 August 7, 2007 the storms appeared to be weakening, and although power levels were still low they were sufficient for Opportunity to begin taking and returning images. By August 21 dust levels were still improving, the batteries were fully charged and Opportunity was able to make its first drive since the dust storms began.

Opportunity made a short drive into Duck Bay on sol 1290 September 11, 2007 and then reversed out again to test traction on the initial slope into Victoria Crater. On sol 1291 September 13, 2007 it returned to begin a more thorough exploration of the inner slope, examining a series of layers of pale-coloured rock in the upper parts of Duck Bay and the face of the promontory Cape Verde in detail.

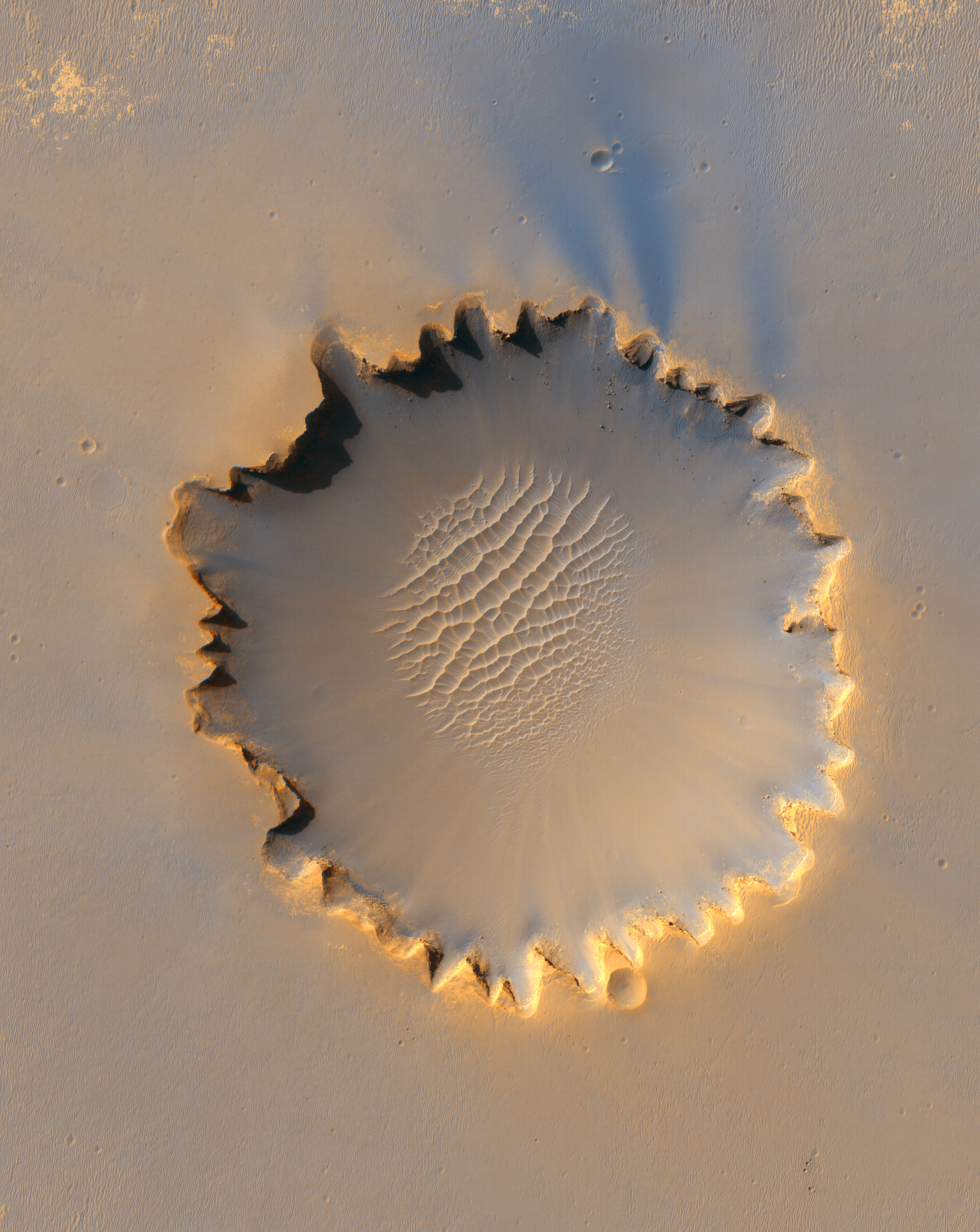
Victoria crater (HiRise).

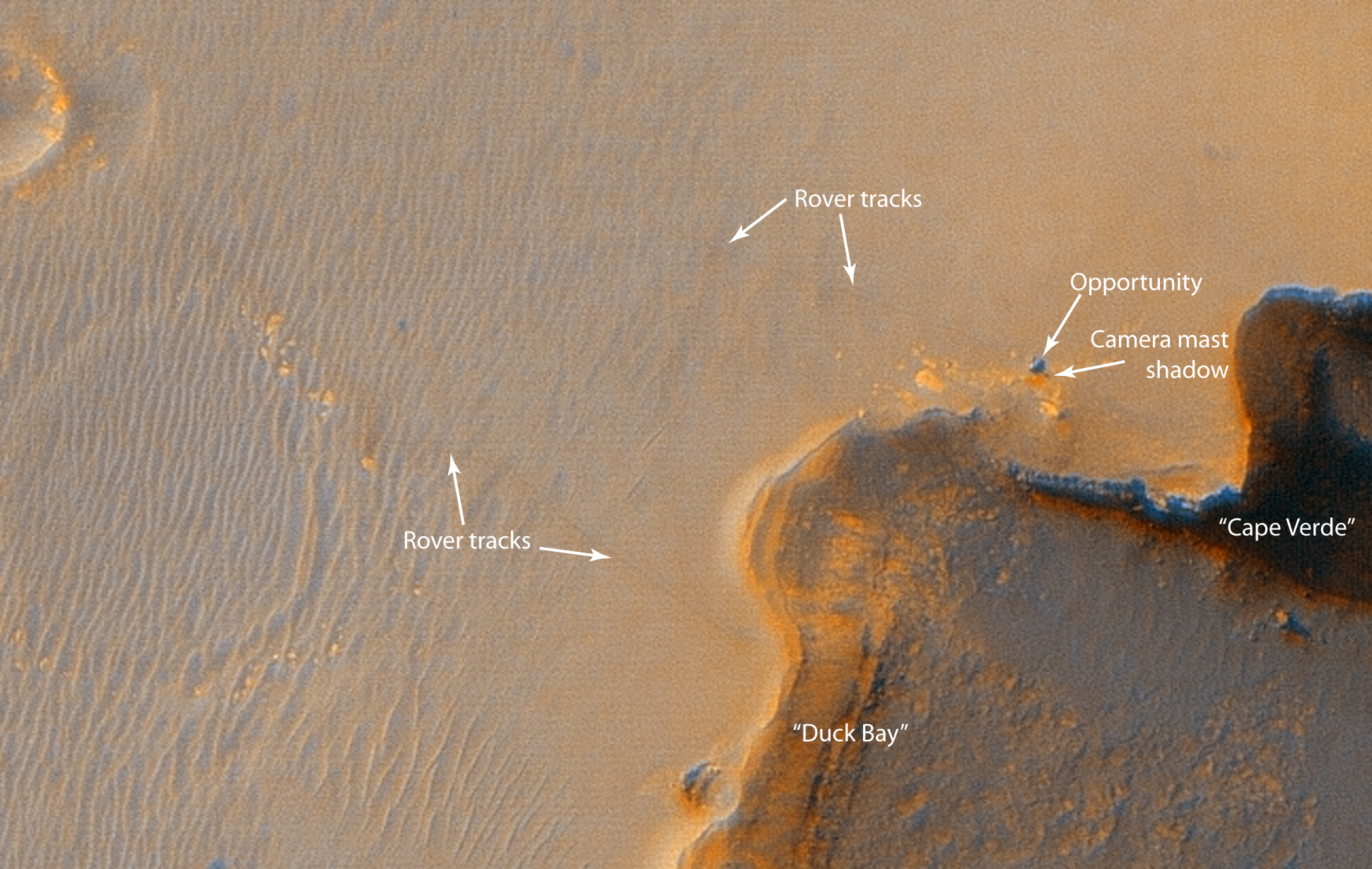
Opportunity at the rim of Victoria Crater, as imaged by MRO (October 3, 2006).

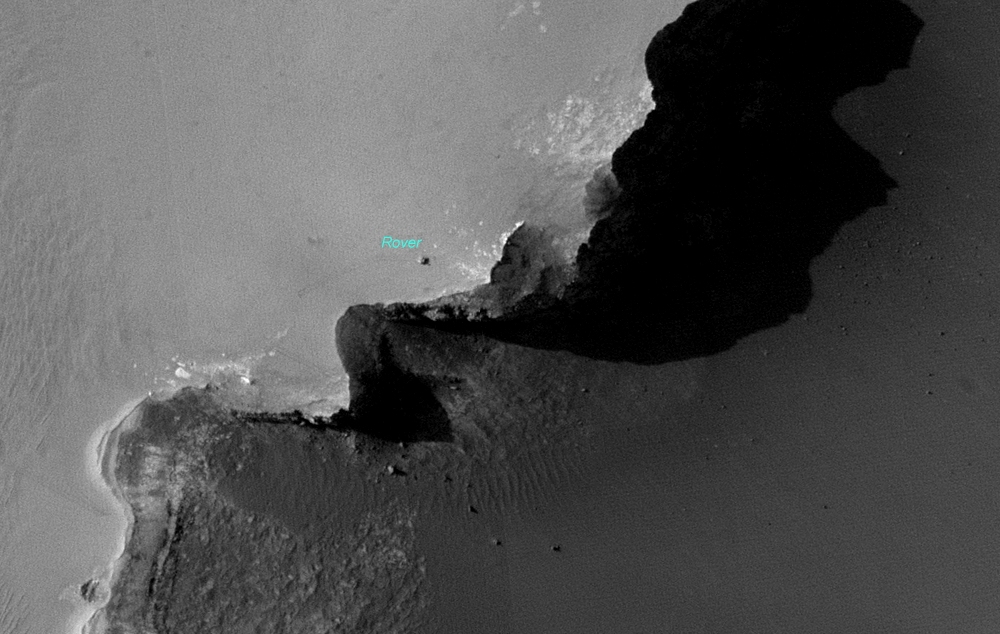
Opportunity at the rim of Victoria Crater, as imaged by MRO (November 29, 2006).

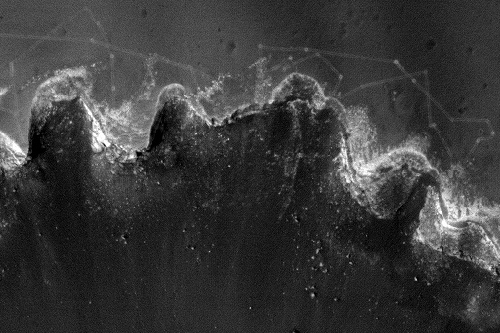
Opportunity tracks, as seen by HiRISE. The white dots are places where rover stopped to perform scientific observations or turned (6/2007).

=== 2008 ===
Rover daily power output averaged 580 watt-hours in the first days of 2008, with atmospheric opacity (tau) caused by dust at about 0.71, and solar array dust factor averaging 0.787.

==== Inspecting Victoria crater ====
On Sol 1502 (April 15, 2008) the motor stalled at the beginning of an unstowing operation at the end of a drive, when the arm was still tucked underneath the rover. The motor continued to stall on all subsequent attempts, sol after sol. Engineers performed tests at various times of day to measure electrical resistance. They found that the resistance was lowest (essentially normal) when the joint was at its warmest—in the morning, following deep sleep, after the heater had been on for several hours, and just before the T-stat opened. They decided to try to unstow the arm one more time under these conditions.

At 08:30 local Mars time on Sol 1529 (May 14, 2008), they allowed Opportunity to direct as much current as possible to the warm, joint-1 azimuth motor in order to get the robotic arm into a usable position, in front of the rover. It worked.

Because Opportunity will likely never again stow the robotic arm, engineers devised a strategy for driving the rover safely with the arm deployed in front.

==== Departing Victoria crater ====
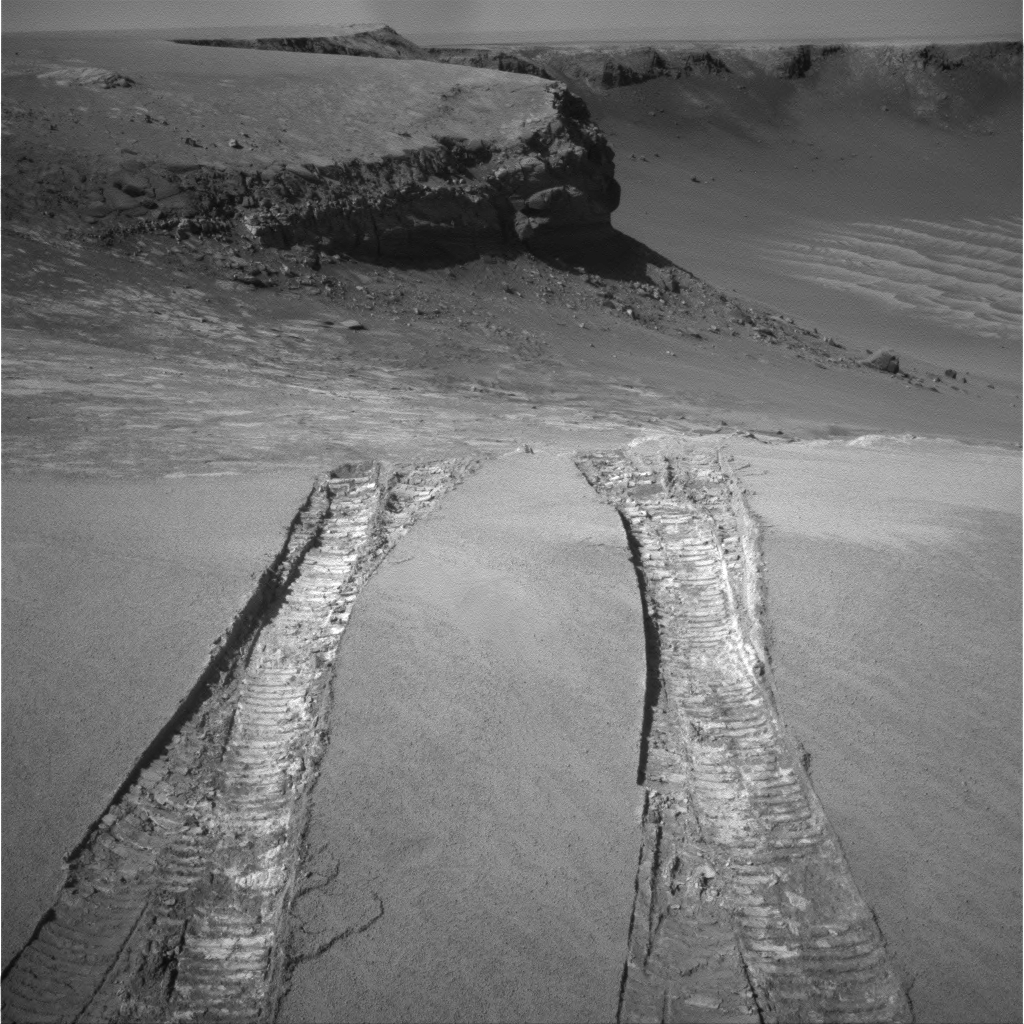
Departing Victoria crater

The rover exited Victoria crater's Duck Bay on August 24–28, 2008 (sol 1630–1634). Before exiting the crater the rover experienced a current spike similar to the one that preceded the malfunction of the right front wheel of its twin Spirit. After Victoria crater and during its journey to Endeavour crater the rover investigated sets of "dark cobbles" on the Meridiani plains.

Endeavour is 22 km (14 mi) in diameter and is 12 kilometers (7.5 mi) south-east of Victoria. Rover drivers estimated that this distance could be traversed in about two years. Scientists expected to see a much deeper stack of rock layers at the crater than those examined by Opportunity in Victoria. The discovery of phyllosilicate clay-bearing rock on the Endeavour crater rim promised exposure to a rock-type that is even more hospitable to life than types previously analyzed.

The solar conjunction, where the Sun is between Earth and Mars, started on sol 1366 November 29, 2008 and communication with the rovers was not possible until December 13, 2008. During this time the rover team planned to have Opportunity use the Mössbauer spectrometer to examine a rock outcrop named "Santorini".

=== 2009 ===
==== Driving through Meridiani plains ====
On sol 1818 (March 7, 2009) Opportunity first saw the rim of Endeavour after driving about 3.2 km (2.0 mi) since it left Victoria in August 2008. Opportunity also saw Iazu crater that was about 38 kilometers (24 mi) away and is about 7 kilometers (4.3 mi) in diameter.

On sol 1848 (April 7, 2009) Opportunity generated 515 watt-hours after a cleaning event of the solar arrays increased energy production by about 40%. From April 16 to 22 (sol 1859 to 1865) Opportunity made a series of drives and during that week traveled a total distance of 478 meters (1,568 ft). The drive actuator for the right front wheel, which had been rested while Opportunity studied a rock outcrop called "Penrhyn", had motor currents very close to normal levels.

==== More meteorite findings ====
On sol 1947 (July 18, 2009) a large dark rock was noted in the opposite direction from which Opportunity was traveling and so the rover headed toward it, reaching it on sol 1957 (July 28). The rock turned out to be a meteorite and was named Block Island. Opportunity spent until September 12, 2009 (Sol 2004) investigating the meteorite, before returning to its journey toward Endeavour Crater.

Its journey was interrupted on Sol 2022 by the find of another meteorite, a 0.5 meters (1.6 ft) specimen dubbed 'Shelter Island', which the rover investigated until Sol 2034. It then headed for another meteorite, 'Mackinac Island', which it reached four sols later on sol 2036 (October 17, 2009). The rover conducted a drive-by imaging sequence but otherwise did not investigate this meteorite, resuming its journey to Endeavour.

On sol 2059 (November 10, 2009) the rover reached a rock target of interest, named 'Marquette Island'. Prolonged study until sol 2121 January 12, 2010 ensued, as it was uncertain what type of rock this represented, but the eventual conclusion was that it was rock ejecta from deep within the surface of Mars rather than a meteorite.

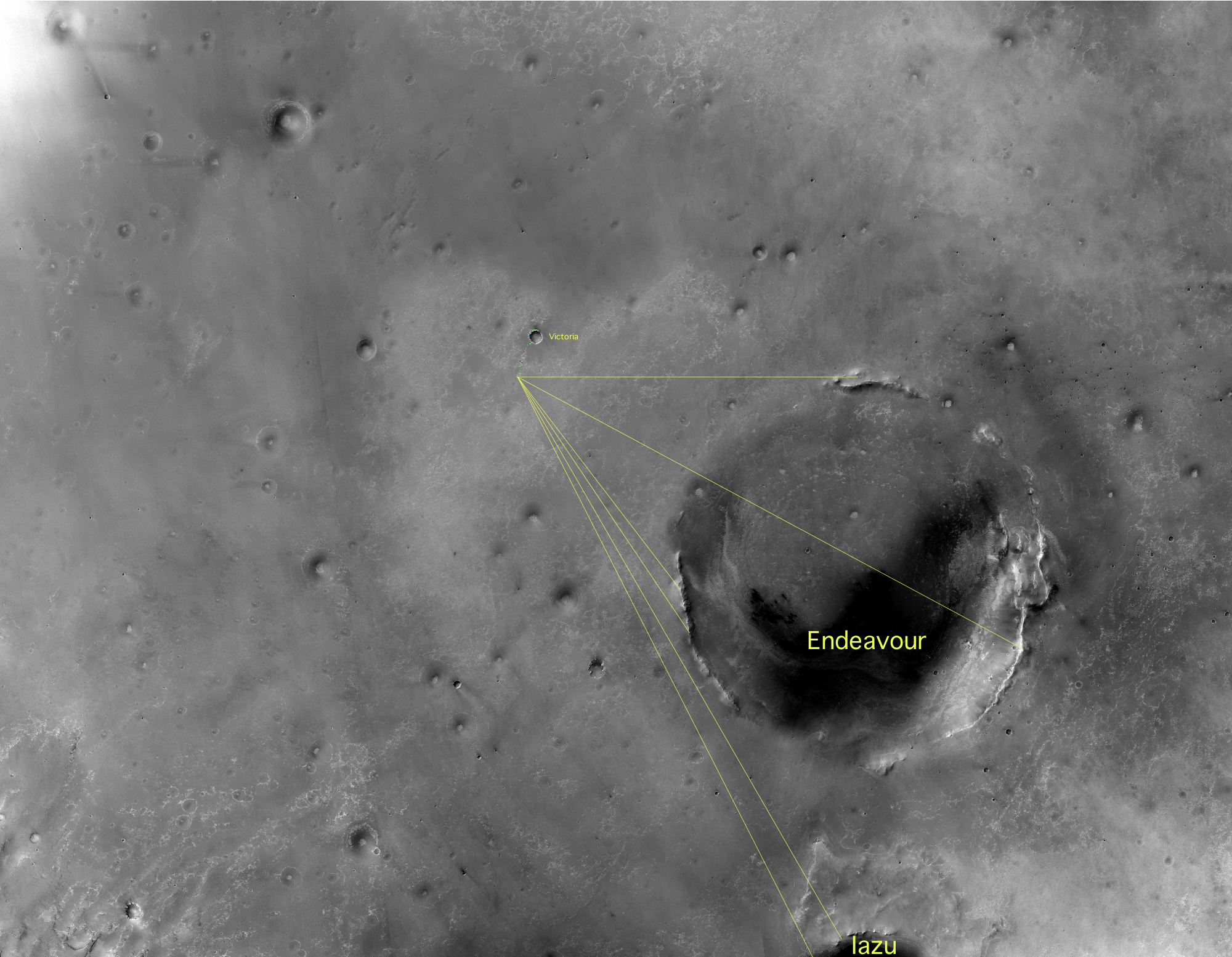
Annotated image showing the position of Opportunity on March 7, 2009, and names for the craters Iazu, Endeavour, and Victoria.

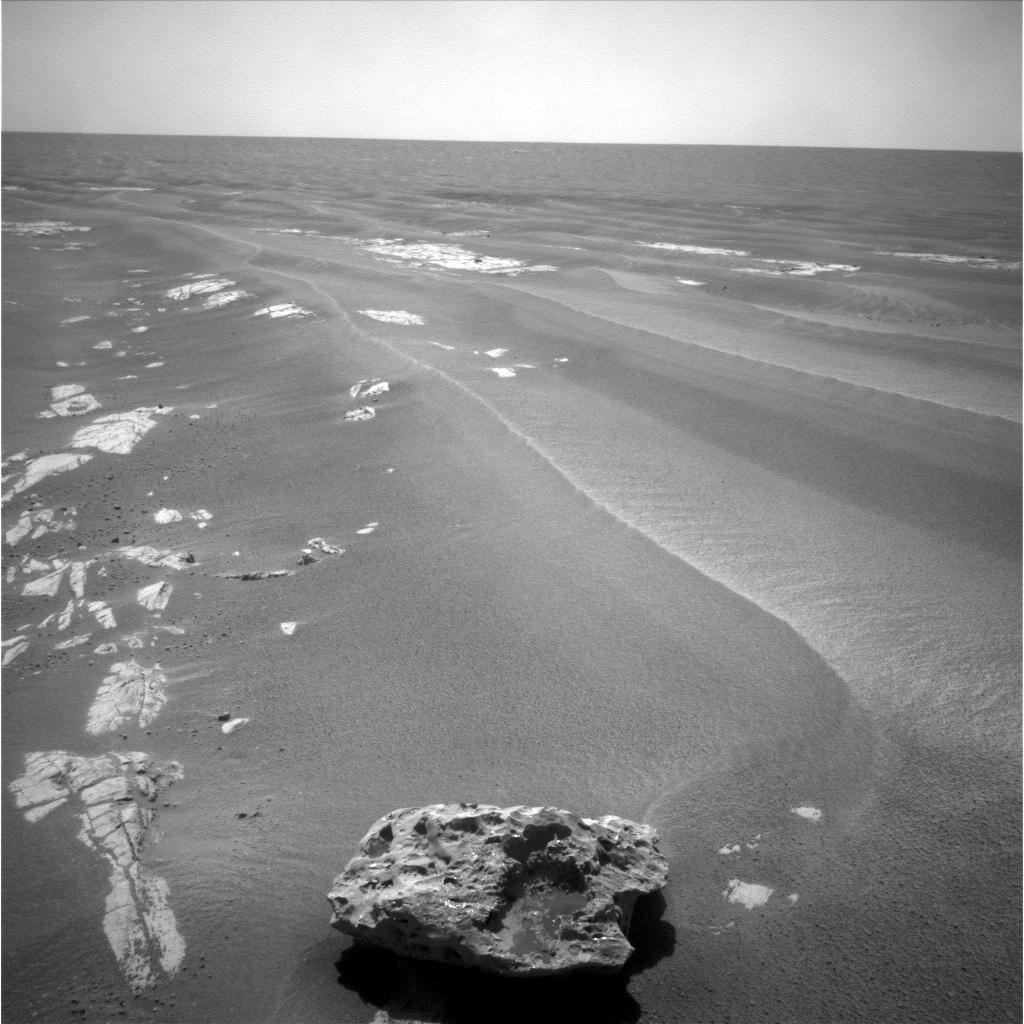
On July 18, 2009 Opportunity imaged an oddly shaped, dark rock, which was found to be a meteorite.

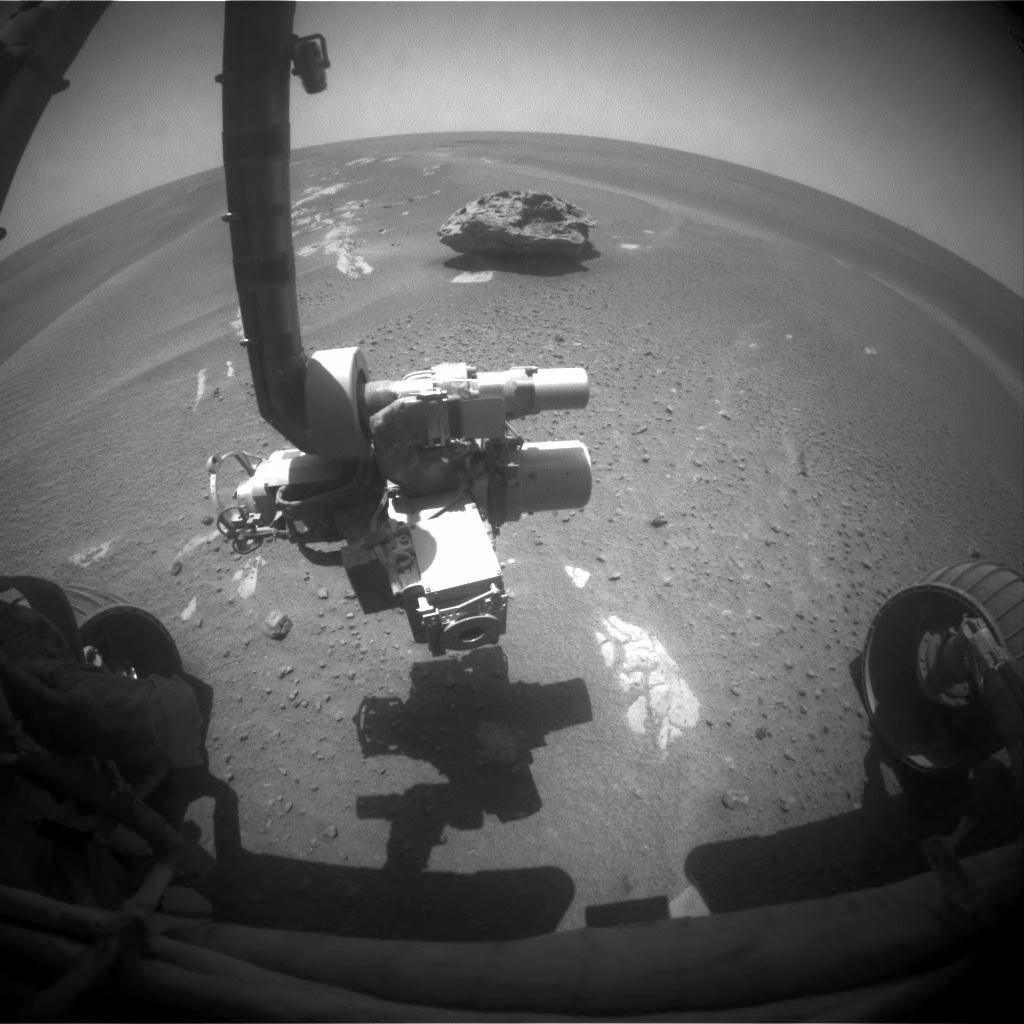
Opportunity prepares to inspect the unusual rock, now dubbed Block Island. It is the largest meteorite found by a Martian rover so far.

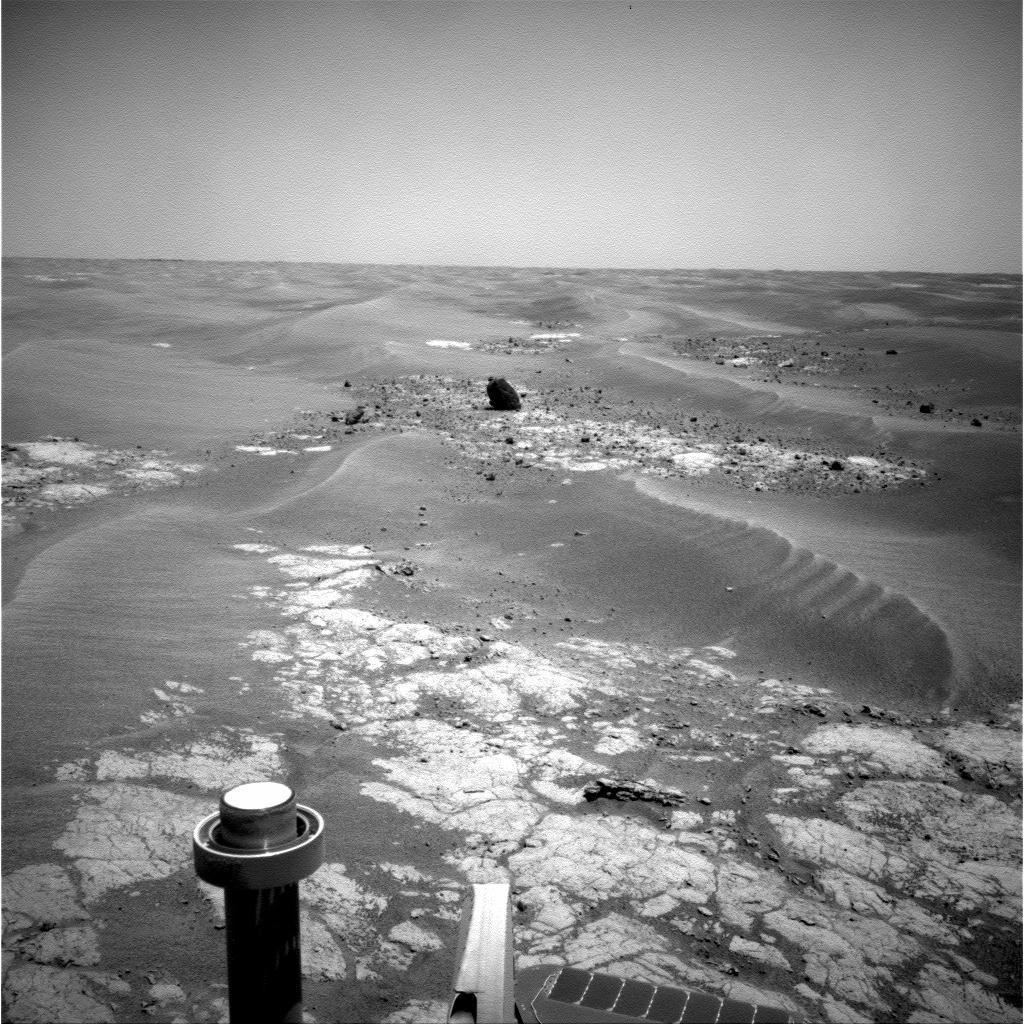
Opportunity took this picture of a rock informally named 'Marquette Island' as it approached the rock for investigations that have suggested the rock is a stony meteorite.

=== 2010 ===
==== Concepción ====
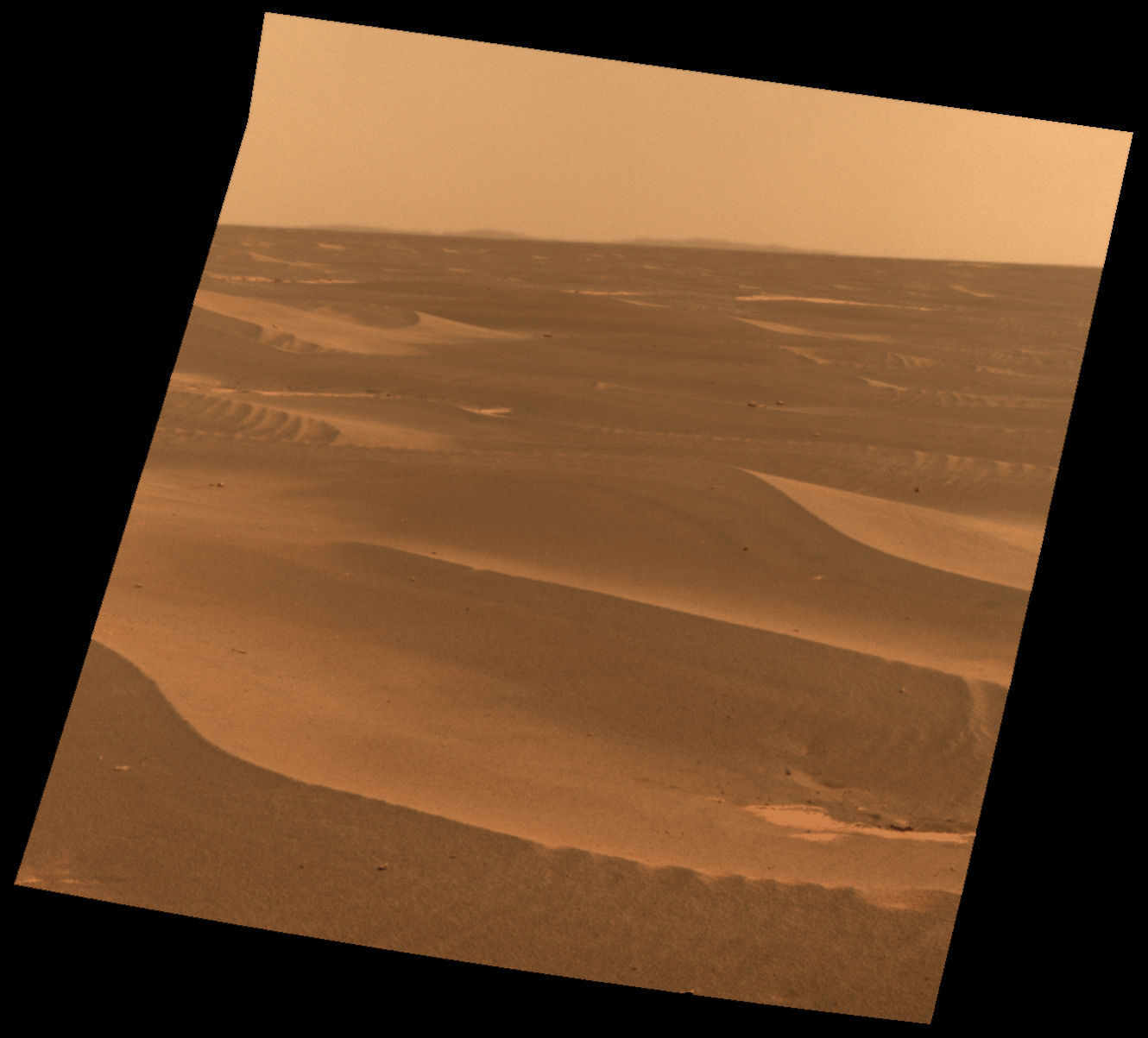
After rover left Concepcion crater, it took this view southward spotting the rim of Bopulu crater 65 kilometers (40 miles) away.

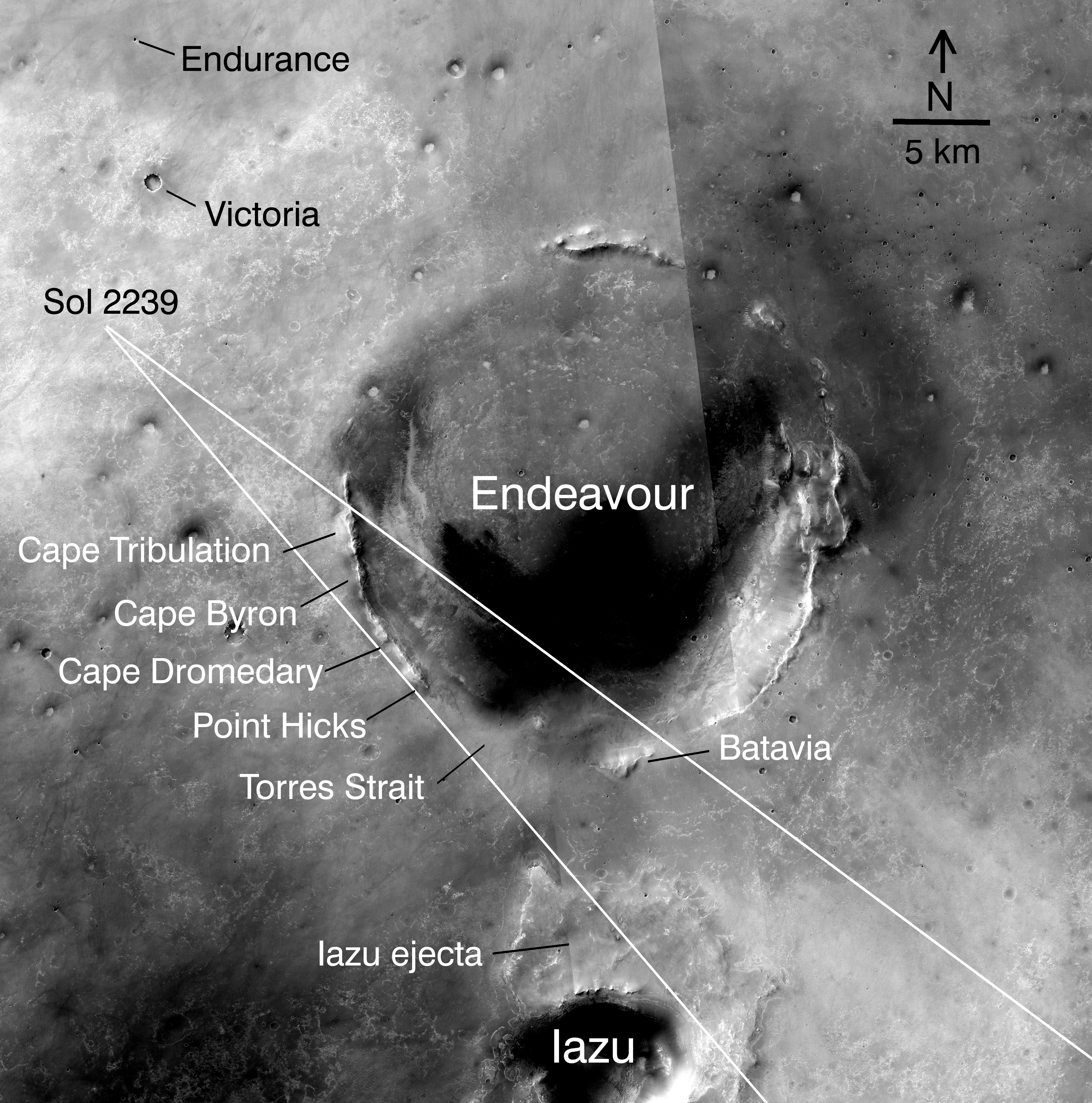
Map of the region around Opportunity shows the relative locations of several craters and the rover in May 2010.

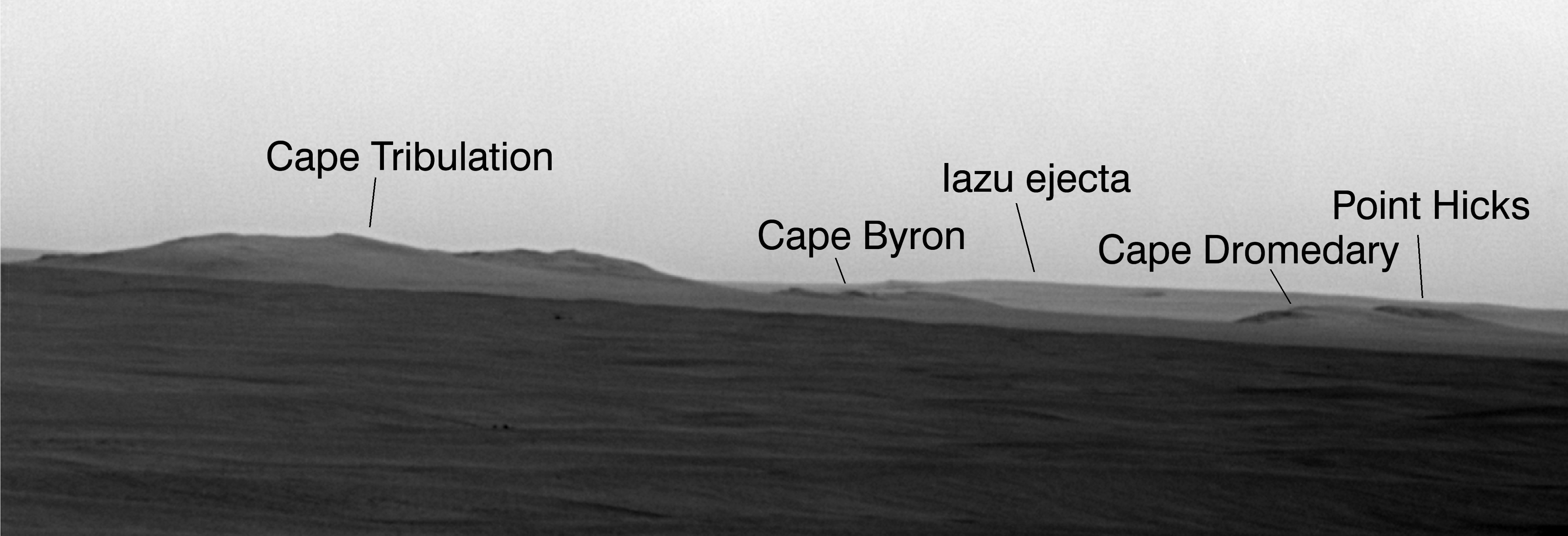
The view from the rover's perspective from the location noted in the above top-down view. The white lines in the above view indicate the rover's field of view in this image.

On January 28, 2010 (Sol 2138) Opportunity arrived at Concepcion crater. Opportunity successfully circumnavigated the 10-meter (33 ft) diameter crater before continuing on towards Endeavour. Energy production varied from about 305 watt-hours to about 270 Wh during this period.

On sol 2231 (May 5, 2010), due to potentially hazardous dune fields along the direct path between Victoria and Endeavour, a new route was charted that extended the distance to travel between the two craters to 19 kilometers (12 mi).

On (May 19, 2010), Opportunity reached 2244 sols of operation, making it the longest Mars surface mission in history, breaking the record of 2245 sols set by Viking 1.

==== Santa Maria crater ====
In July 2010, it was announced that the Opportunity team would use the theme of names given to places visited by British Royal Navy Captain, Lieutenant James Cook, in his 1769–1771 Pacific Ocean voyage in command of HMS Endeavour, for informal names of sites at Endeavour Crater. These would include "Cape Tribulation" and "Cape Dromedary", "Cape Byron" (the most easterly point of the Australian mainland), and "Point Hicks" (the part of the Australian mainland first sighted by the Endeavour in 1770).

On sol 2353 (September 8, 2010), the halfway point of the 19 kilometers (12 mi) journey between Victoria crater and Endeavour crater was reached.

In November the rover spent a few days imaging a 20 meters (66 ft) crater called Intrepid while navigating through a field of small impact craters. On sol 2419 November 14, 2010 total odometry passed the 25 kilometers (16 mi) mark. Average solar array energy production in October and November was about 600 watt-hours.

On sol 2449 (December 15, 2010) the rover arrived at Santa Maria and spent several weeks investigating the 90 meters (300 ft) wide crater. The results from Opportunity were compared to data taken from orbit by the CRISM instrument, a spectrometer, on the Mars Reconnaissance Orbiter. CRISM had detected water-bearing minerals at Santa Maria crater, and the rover helped further analyze this. Opportunity drove farther in that Martian year (that is about 2 Earth years), than in any previous year.

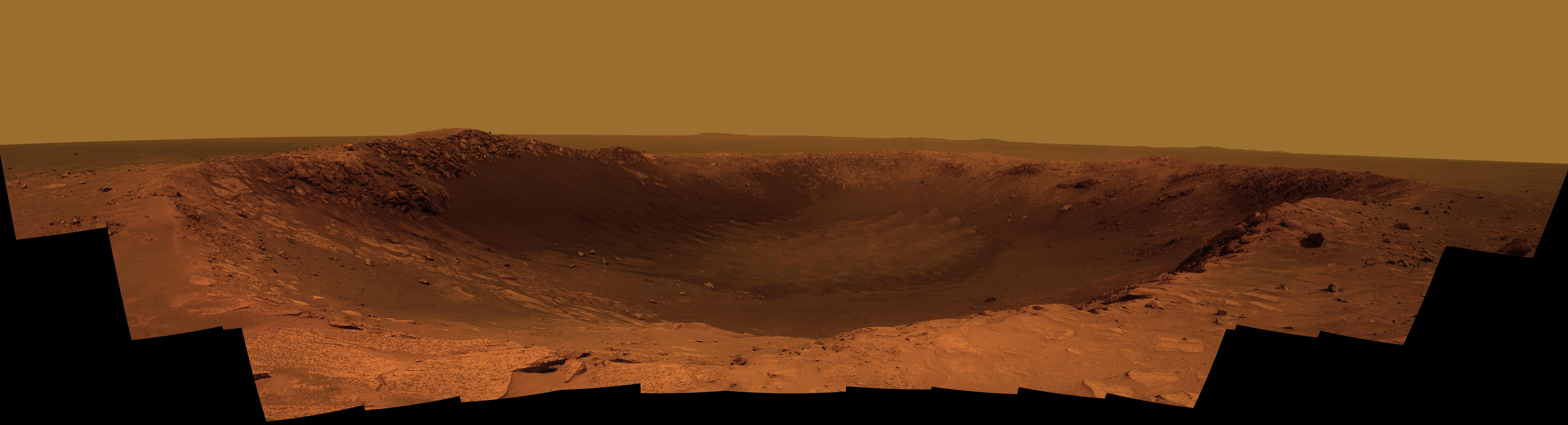
Santa Maria Crater panorama

=== 2011 ===
==== Heading to Endeavour crater ====
After its arrival at the edge of Santa Maria crater, the team positioned the rover at its southeastern rim and collected data. They also prepared for the two-week solar conjunction of late January, when the Sun was between Earth and Mars and communication was blocked. In late March Opportunity began the 6.5 kilometers (4.0 mi) journey between Santa Maria and Endeavour, and on June 1, the rover passed the 30 kilometers (19 mi) traverse milestone (over 50 times its designed distance). Two weeks later, on sol 2657 (July 17, 2011), Opportunity had driven 32 km (20 mi) on Mars.

By sol 2699 (August 29, 2011), Opportunity had continued to function effectively 30 times longer than its planned 90-sol mission, aided by solar cell cleaning events, and performed extensive geological analysis of Martian rocks and planetary surface features with its instruments.

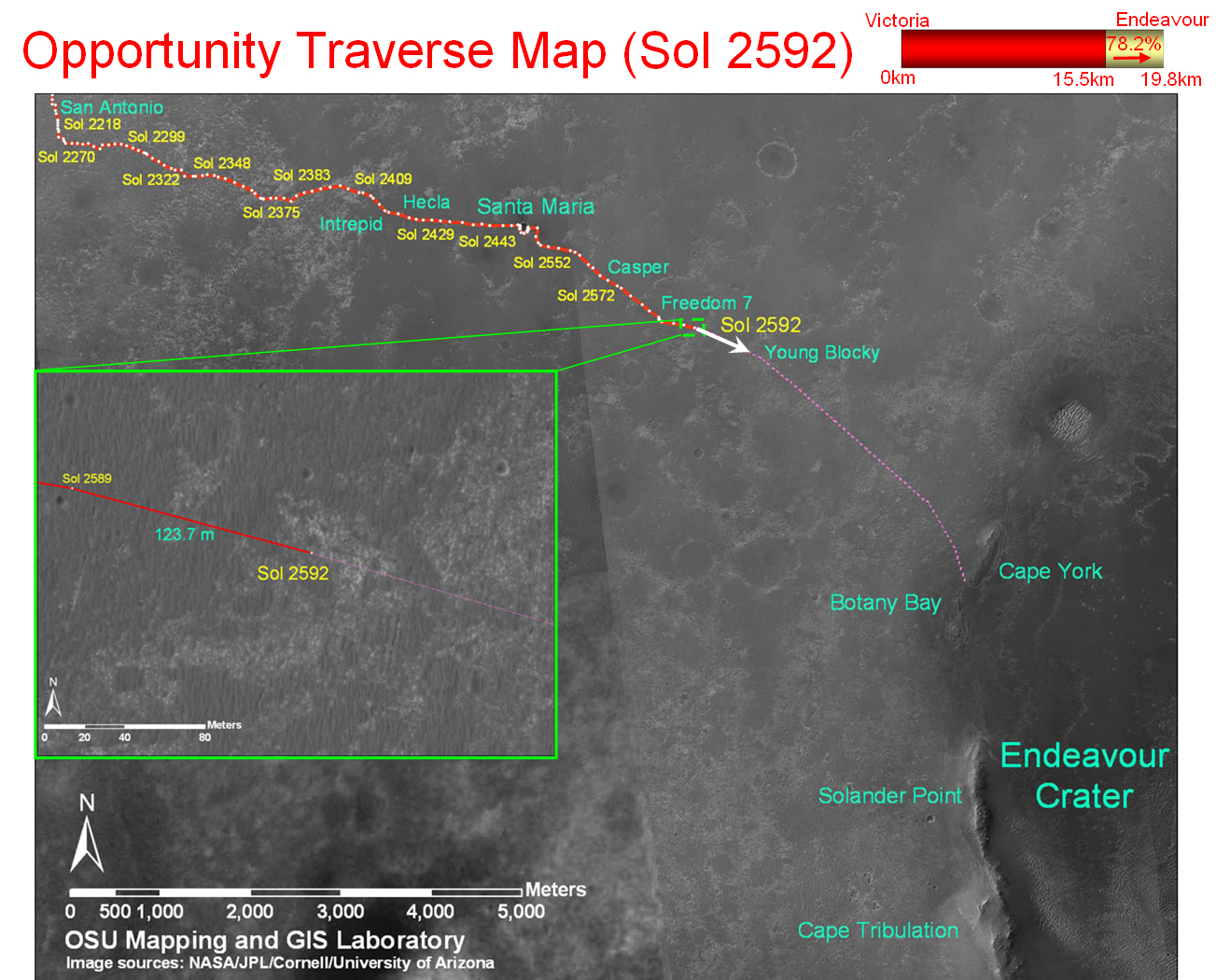
A infographic showing the traverse from Victoria to Endeavour, Sol 2592

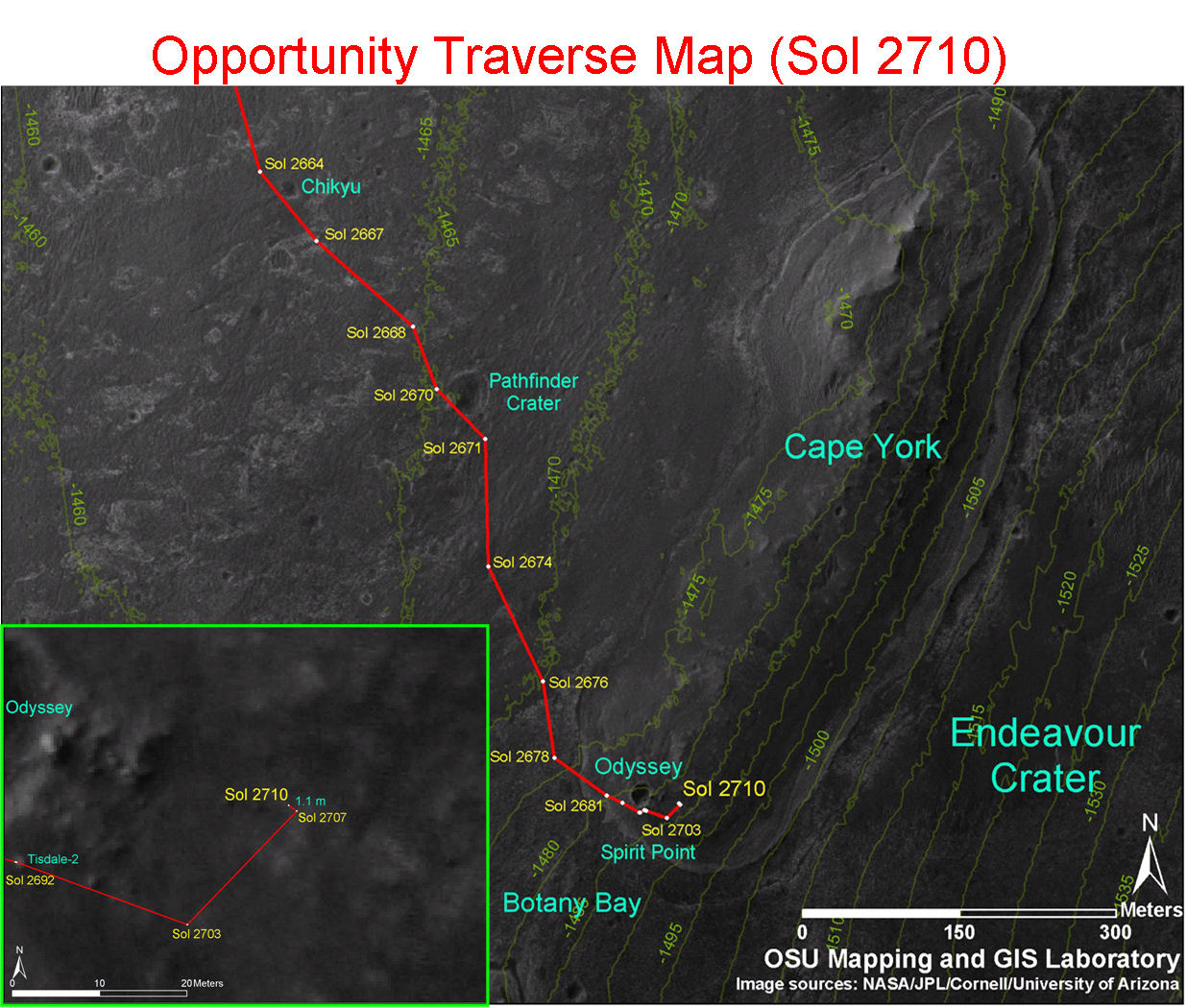
Opportunity arrives at Endeavour crater, Sol 2710

==== Endeavour crater arrival ====
Opportunity arrived at Endeavour crater on sol 2709 (August 9, 2011), at a landmark called Spirit Point named after its rover twin, after traversing 21 km (13 mi) from Victoria crater, over a three-year period. Endeavour is 23 km (14 mi) wide and offers scientists new terrain to explore, including older rocks than encountered heretofore, and clay minerals that may have formed in the presence of water. The rover's deputy principal investigator, Ray Arvidson, said it will probably not enter Endeavour crater as it appears to contain material observed previously. The rocks on the rim are older than any previously studied by Opportunity. "I think there's much more interest in driving around the perimeter of the rim," said Arvidson. The rover survived so long this goal was accomplished, and by 2016 it was decided to not only enter Endevaour crater but also explore, for the first time in history what is thought to be a water carved gully on Mars (update:2016).

Upon arriving at Endeavour, Opportunity almost immediately began discovering Martian phenomena not previously observed. On sol 2692 (August 22, 2011) the rover began examining Tisdale 2, a large ejecta block. "This is different from any rock ever seen on Mars," said Steve Squyres, principal investigator for Opportunity at Cornell University in Ithaca, New York. "It has a composition similar to some volcanic rocks, but there's much more zinc and bromine than we've typically seen. We are getting confirmation that reaching Endeavour really has given us the equivalent of a second landing site for Opportunity." (See also Cape York (Mars))

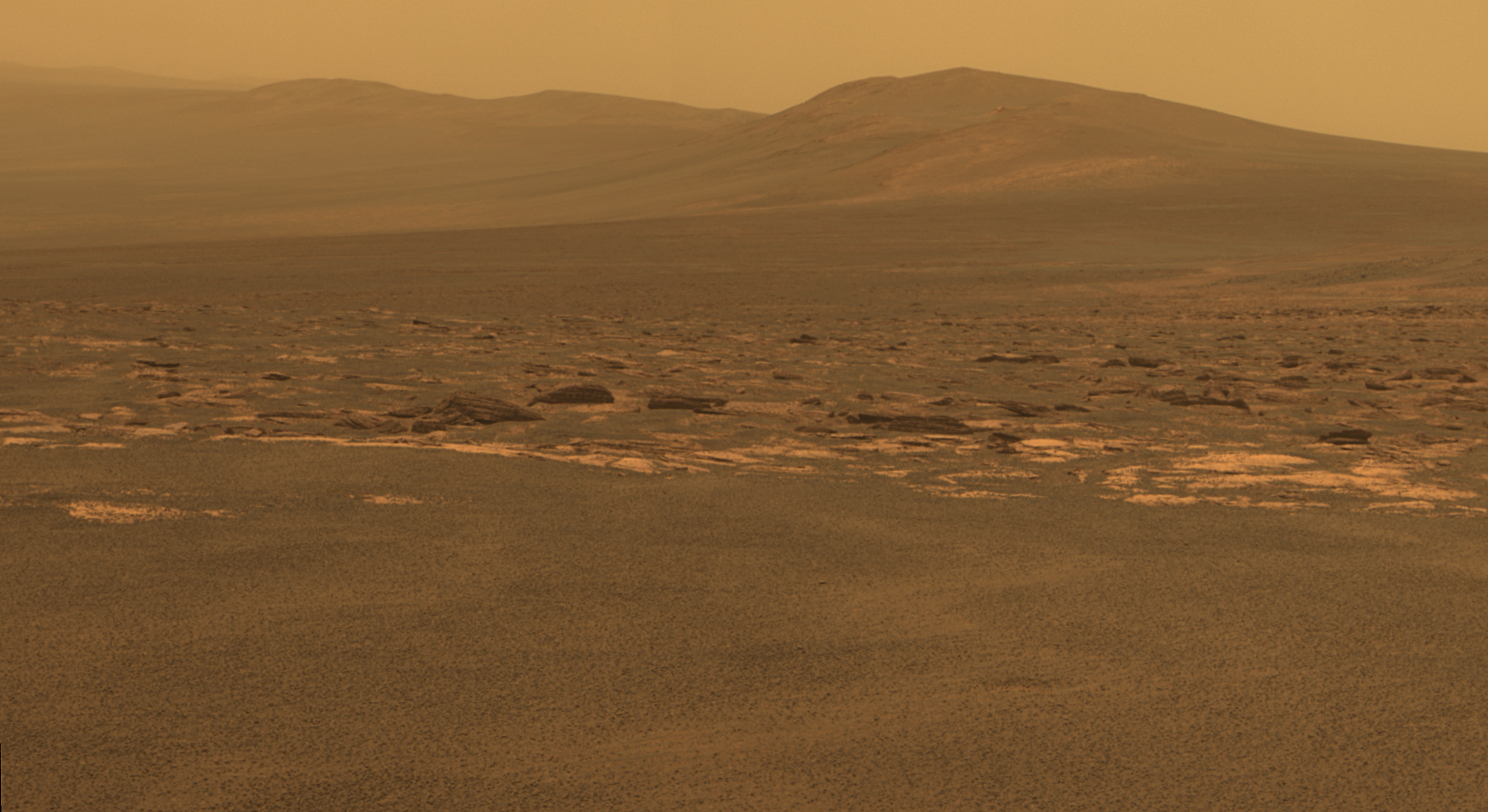
West Rim of Endeavour Crater

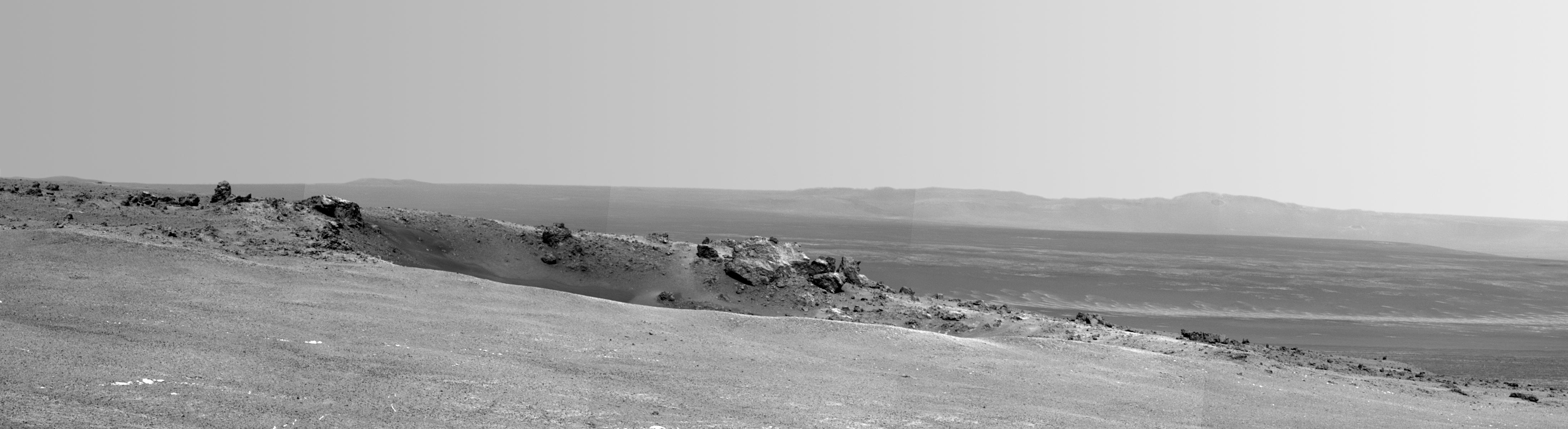
Spirit Point at Endeavour Crater

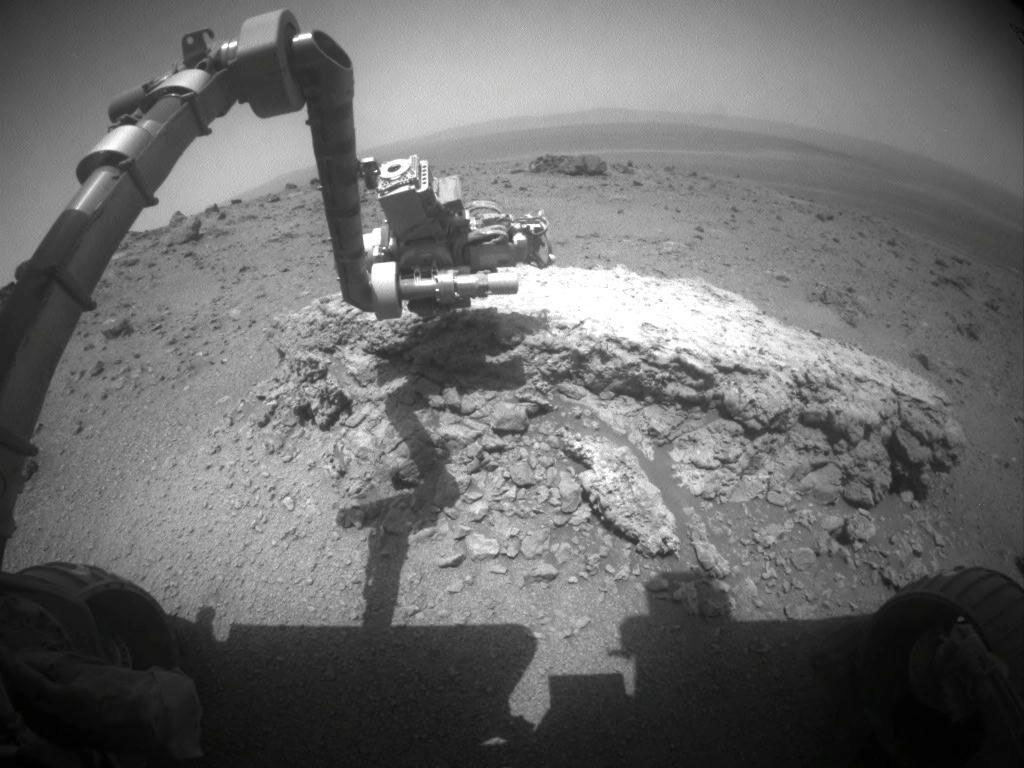
Opportunity examines Tisdale 2

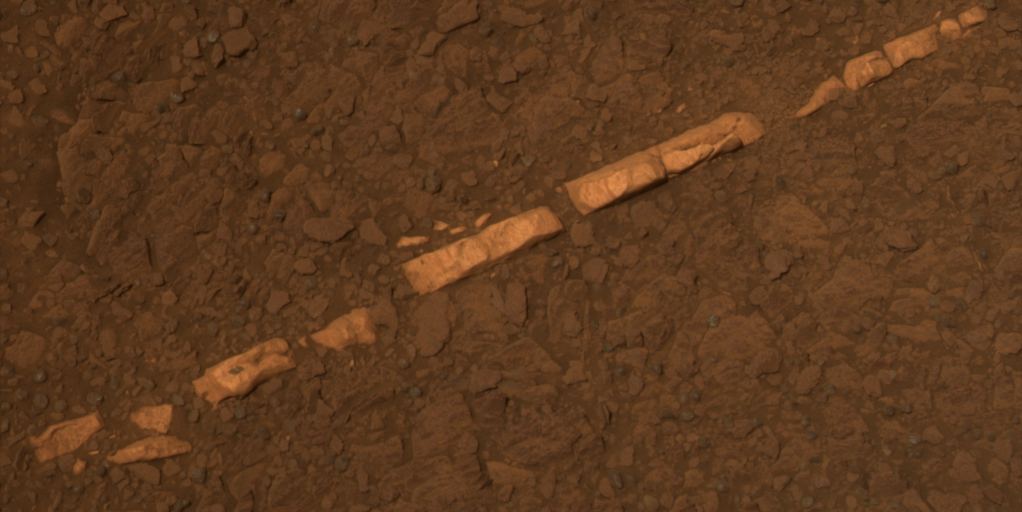
"Homestake" formation

In December the Homestake formation was analyzed, which was concluded to be formed of gypsum. Using three of the rover's instruments - the Microscopic Imager, the Alpha Particle X-Ray Spectrometer and the Panoramic Camera's filters - researchers determined the deposit to be hydrated calcium sulfate, or gypsum, a mineral that does not occur except in the presence of water. This discovery was called "slam dunk" evidence that "water flowed through underground fractures in the rock."

Opportunity had driven more than 34 km (21 mi) by November 22, 2011 (sol 2783), as preparations were made for the coming Martian winter. It moved to terrain that positioned it about 15 degrees to the north, an angle more favorable for solar energy production during the Martian winter.

=== 2012 ===
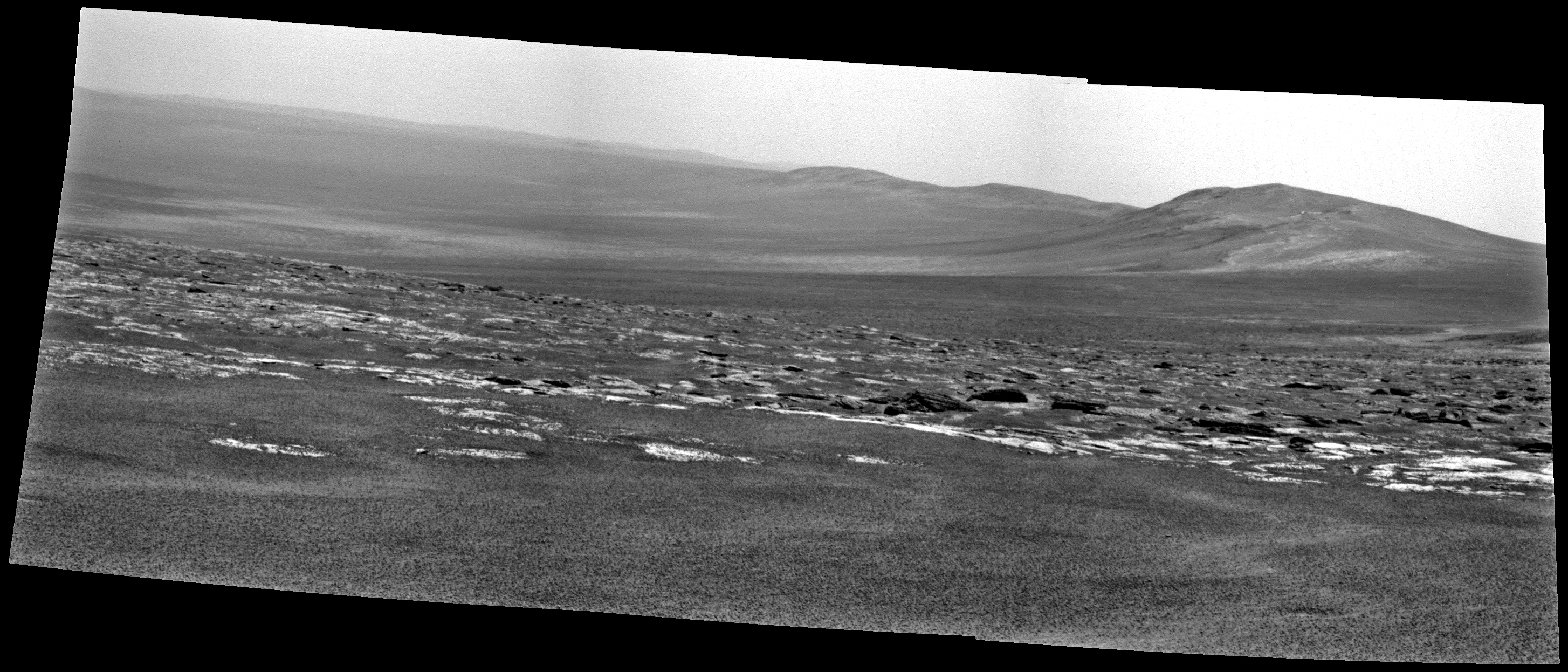
Looking south along Western rim of Endeavour crater, August 2011

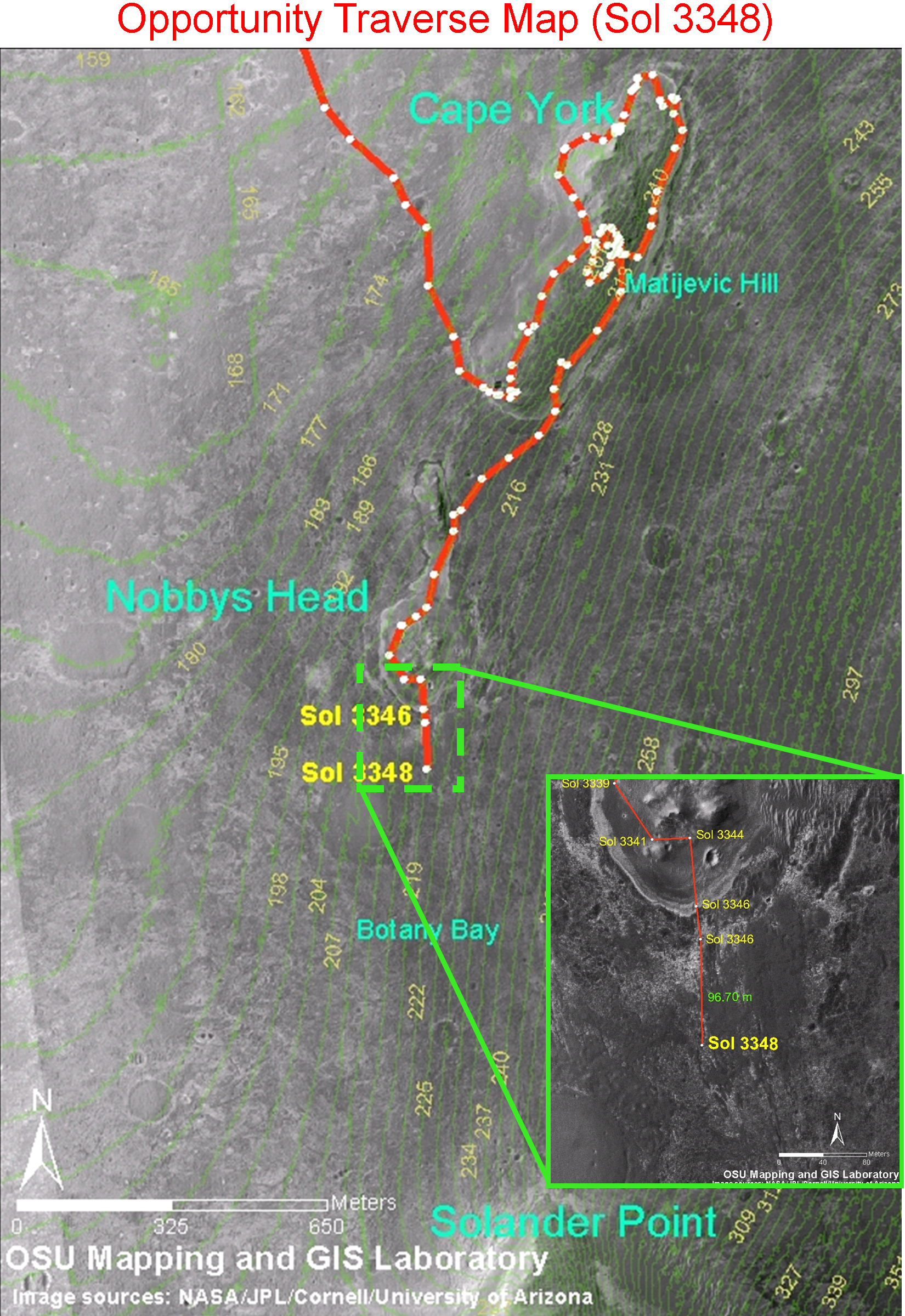
Rover's arrival and subsequent path around Cape York, and its departure as it headed south into Botany Bay towards Solander Point between 2012 and 2013

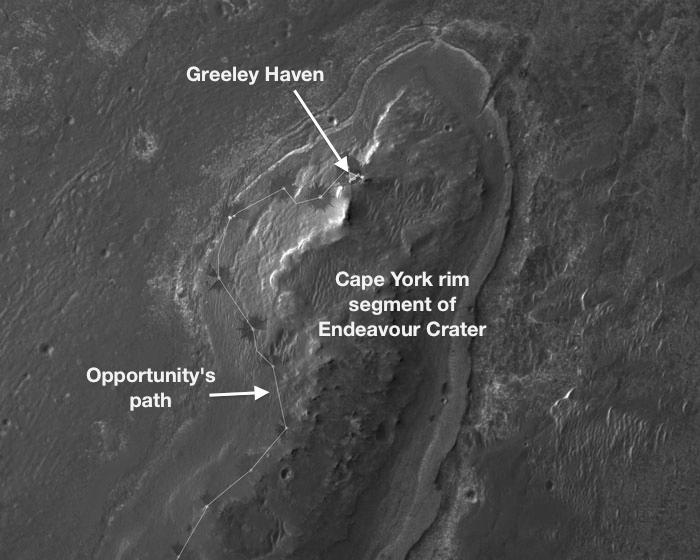
Traverse map showing location of Greely and the rover's track in 2012

==== Greeley Haven ====
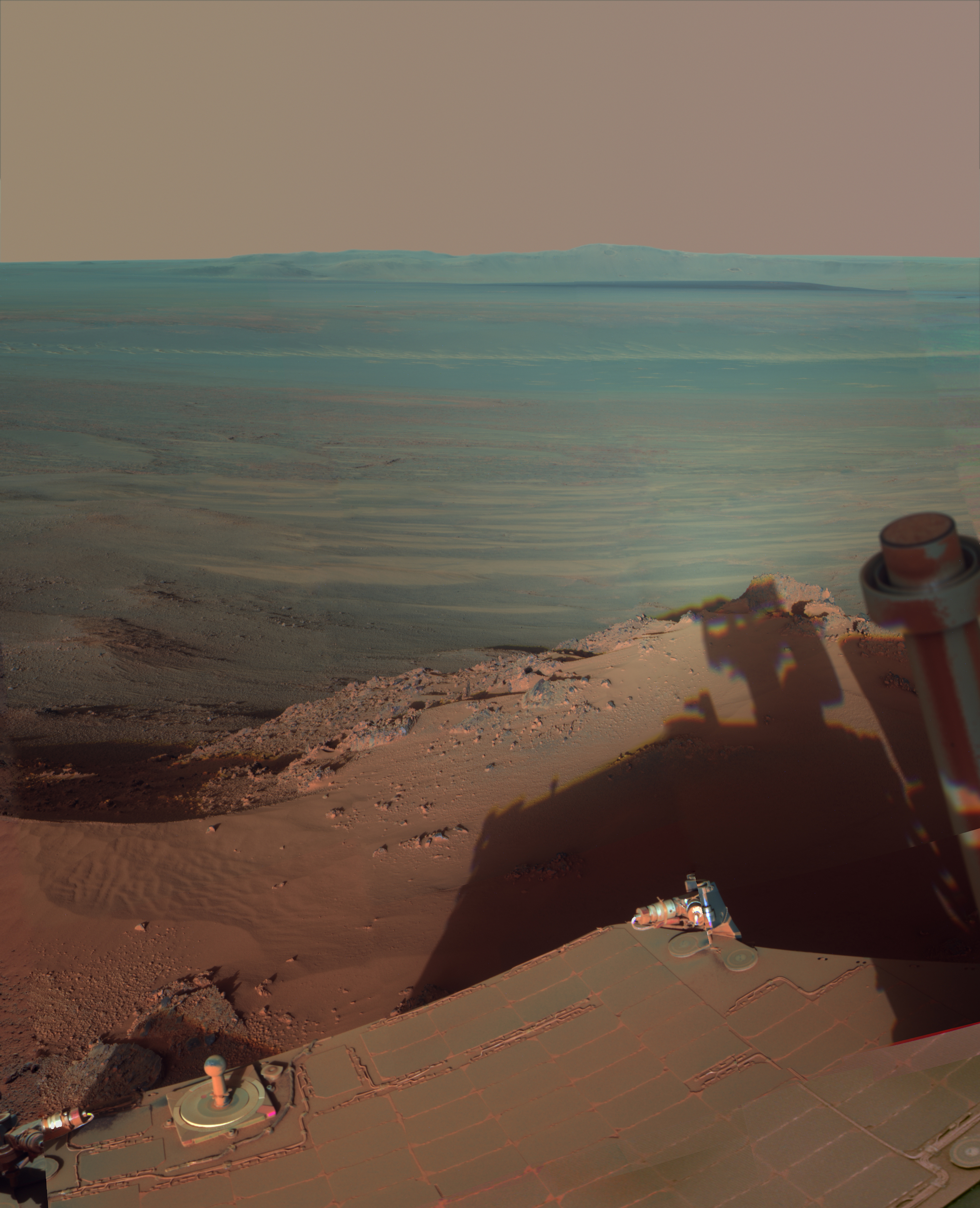
View over the Endeavour crater, imaged by Opportunity in March 2012. (False-color image)

In January 2012 the rover returned data from Greeley Haven, named after the geologist Ronald Greeley, while enduring its fifth Martian winter. It studied the Martian wind, which has been described as "the most active process on Mars today", and conducted a radio science experiment. By carefully measuring radio signals, wobbles in Martian rotation may show whether the planet has a solid or liquid interior. The winter worksite sits on the Cape York segment of the rim of Endeavour Crater. Opportunity reached the edge of this 23 km (14 mi) crater in August after three years of driving from smaller Victoria Crater, which it studied for two years.

On Sol 2852 (February 1, 2012) the energy production from the solar array was 270 watt-hours, with a Mars atmospheric opacity (Tau) of 0.679, a solar array dust factor of 0.469, with total odometry at 34.36 km (21.35 mi). By March (around Sol 2890), 'Amboy' rock was studied with the MIMOS II Mössbauer spectrometer and the Microscopic Imager, and the amount of Argon gas in the Martian air was measured. The Mars winter solstice passed on March 30, 2012 (Sol 2909) and on April 1 there was a small cleaning event. On Sol 2913 (April 3, 2012) solar array energy production was 321 watt-hours.

The mission of Mars rover Opportunity continued, and by May 1, 2012 (Sol 2940), energy production had increased to 365 watt-hours, with the solar array dust factor at 0.534. The team prepared the rover for movement and finished up collecting data on Amboy rock. 60 Doppler radio passes were completed over the winter.

On May 8, 2012 (Sol 2947), the rover moved 3.7 metres (12 ft). On that day the Solar energy production was 357 watt-hours with a solar array dust factor of 0.536. Opportunity had been stationary on Greeley Haven for 130 Sols (Mars' days), with a 15 degrees tilt to the North to help survive the winter; after the drive the northerly tilt decreased to 8 degrees. The drive marked the end of the geodynamics science experiment, which used radio Doppler measurements while the rover was stationary. By June 2012, it studied Mars dust and a nearby rock vein christened "Monte Cristo" as it headed North.

==== Exploring Matijevic hill at Cape York ====
On July 2, 2012 Opportunity's 3000 Sols on Mars were celebrated. By July 5, 2012, NASA published a new panorama (seen below) showing the surroundings of Opportunity at the Greeley Haven position at Cape York. Also, the other end of the Endeavour crater is seen in the right half of the scene, a crater that spans 22 kilometers (14 mi) in diameter. On July 12, 2012 (Sol 3010), solar arrays produced 523 watt-hours and 34,580 m (21.49 mi) was the total distance traveled from landing. That month, Mars Reconnaissance Orbiter spotted a dust storm and water ice clouds near the rover.

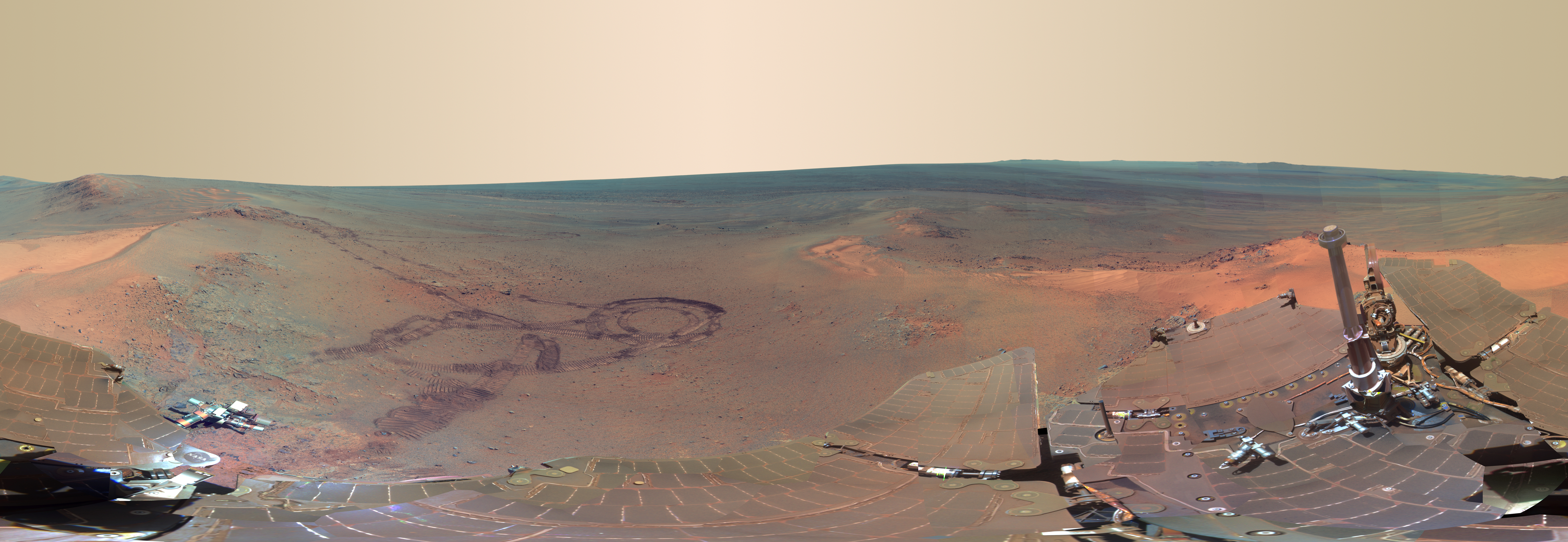
Greeley Haven panorama – a view of Cape York and the Endeavour crater – was taken while overwintering at the Greeley Haven position at Cape York in the first half of 2012. This false-color panoramic view was combined from 817 individual images taken in the near-infrared, green and violet spectral bands.

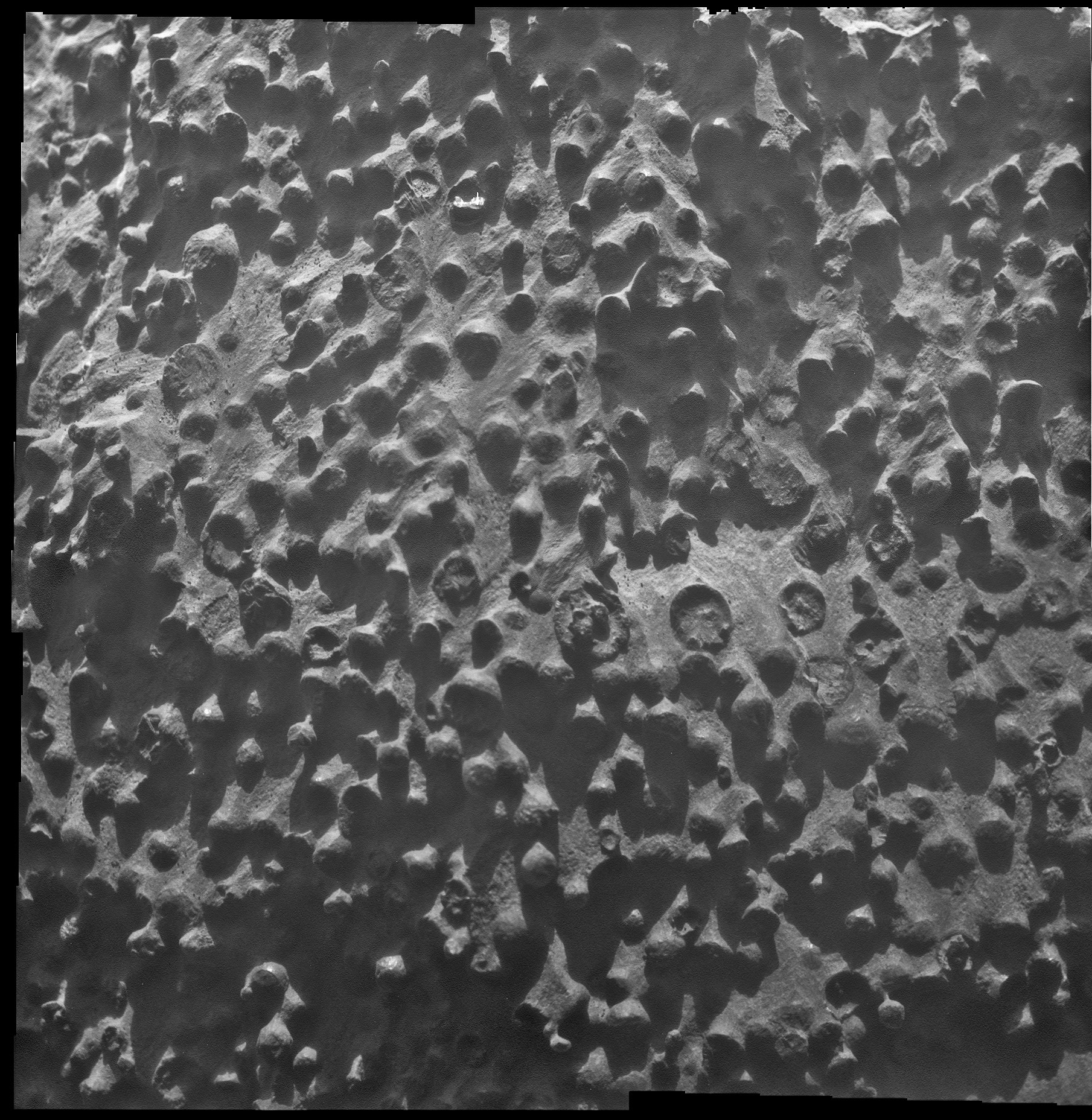
Spheres at Kirkwood, each are about 3 mm across

Before Curiosity landed on August 6, 2012, Opportunity sent special Ultra High Frequency radio signals to simulate Curiosity for a radio observatory in Australia. August activities for Opportunity included collecting data on atmospheric opacity, visiting Sao Rafael and Berrio craters, and achieving 35 kilometers (22 mi) of driving on Sol 3056 (August 28, 2012). Also, on August 19, 2012 Mars Express orbiter automatically exchanged data with both Curiosity and Opportunity in one orbit, its first double contact.

In the fall Opportunity headed south, exploring Matijevic hill and searching for phyllosilicate minerals. Some data was sent to Earth directly using X-Band radio signals, as opposed to orbiter relays. Finally, the number of power cycles on the rover's Inertial Measurement Unit were reduced. Science work included testing various hypotheses about the newly discovered spherules.

A small dust cleaning event occurred on Sol 3175 (Dec. 29, 2012), improving the energy production by about 40 watt-hours per sol. As of Sol 3180 (Jan. 3, 2013), the solar array energy production was 542 watt-hours with an atmospheric opacity (Tau) of 0.961 and an improved solar array dust factor of 0.633.

— NASA

=== 2013 ===
==== Leaving Cape York ====
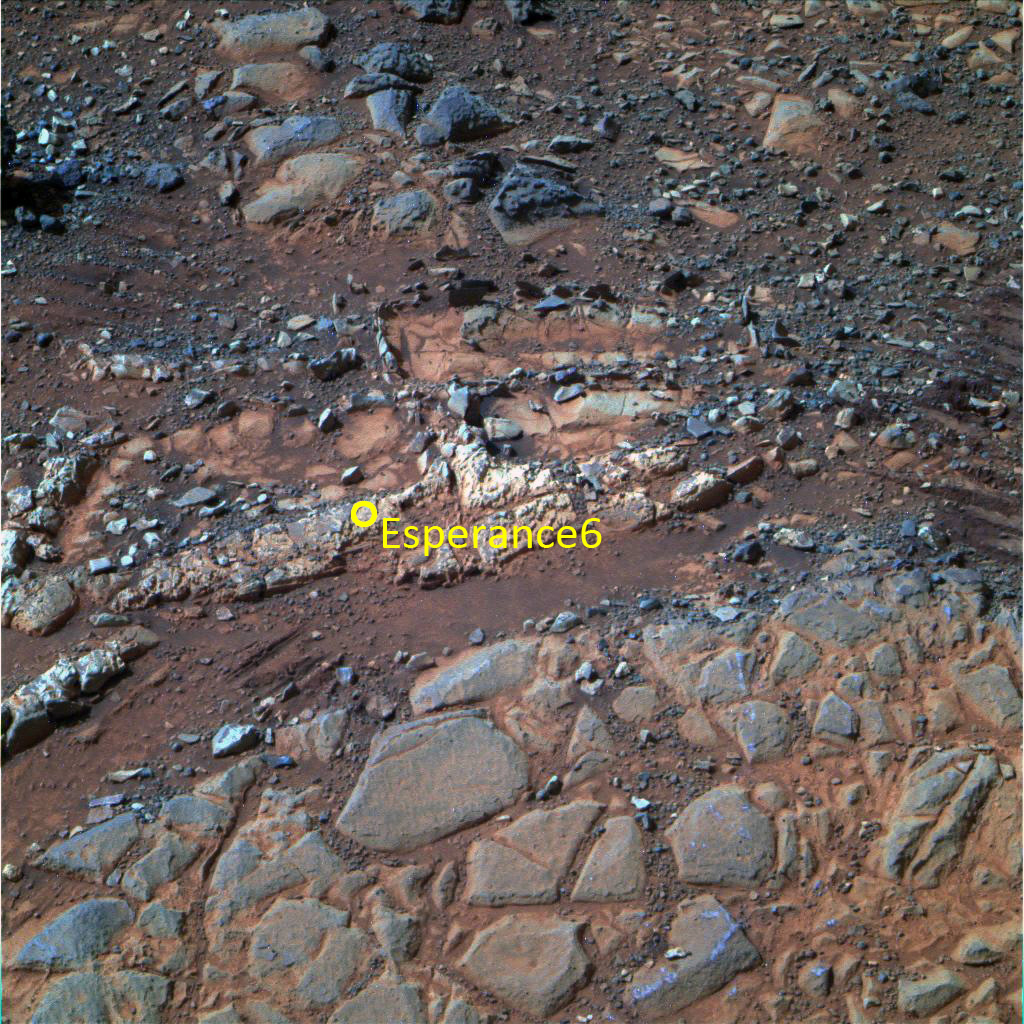
"Esperance" rock on Mars – viewed by the Opportunity Rover (February 23, 2013).

Opportunity began the year at the edge of Endeavour Crater's Cape York, and the total distance travelled since landing on Mars was 35 km (22 mi). After completing work at Matijevic Hill the Opportunity rover headed south to the rim of Endeavour Crater. Next, the rover headed south across a gap in the rim to a place the researchers called Botany Bay, then up onto the next rim segment to the south. There are two hills to the south of it, one called Solander Point and farther south is Cape Tribulation. The current aim is for Opportunity to reach Solander Point before winter reaches the Martian southern hemisphere as the area has ground tilted to the north allowing the rover to stay active during the winter months. In addition Solander Point has a large geological stack for Opportunity to explore. In April 2013, the rover passed through a three-week-long solar conjunction, when communication with Earth was blocked because of the Sun. The rover arm was positioned on a rock during that time so the APXS could collect data.

On May 16, 2013, NASA announced that Opportunity had driven further than any other NASA vehicle on a world other than Earth. After Opportunity's total odometry went over 35.744 kilometers (22.210 mi) it surpassed the total distance driven by the Apollo 17 Lunar Roving Vehicle. The record for longest distance driven by a vehicle on another world was as of 2013 held by the Lunokhod 2 lunar rover. Based on wheel rotations Lunokhod 2 was thought to have covered 37 kilometers (23 mi), but Russian scientists have revised that to an estimated distance of about 42 kilometers (26 mi) based on orbital images of the lunar surface.

On May 17, 2013, NASA announced that a preliminary analysis of one of the rock targets, named "Esperance", suggested that water in the past may have had a neutral pH. This was later confirmed in further studies, supporting the notion that ancient Mars was a "water-rich world with conditions amenable for life". As of June 20, 2013 (Sol 3344), Opportunity's total odometry was reported at 36.84 km (22.89 mi), while en route to 'Solander Point.' June 21, 2013 marked five Martian years on the 'red planet'. The project manager, noting the harsh conditions of the planet, has said each day is "a gift".

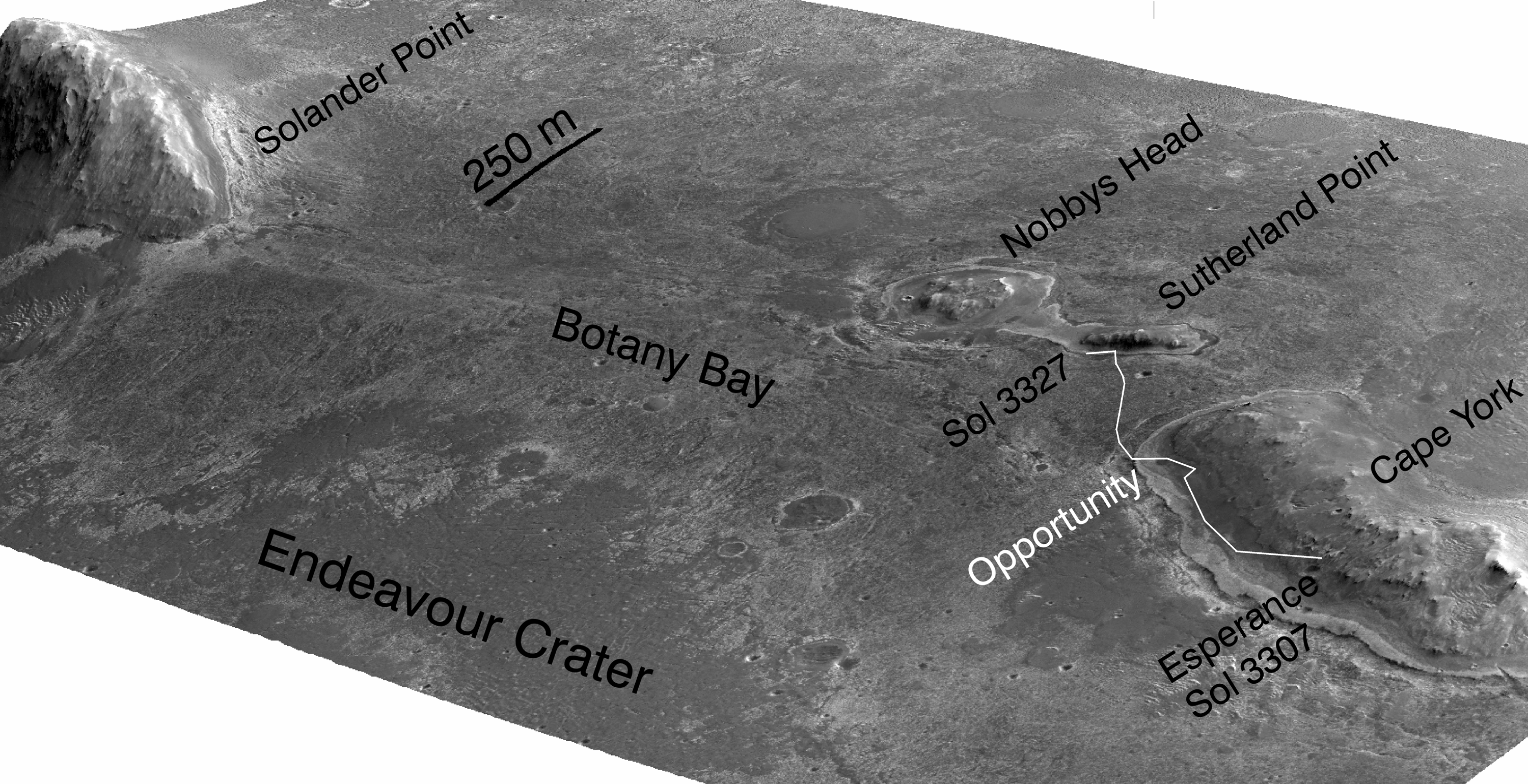
The rover on its way to Solander point, with a traverse line up to July 2013

==== Solander Point ====
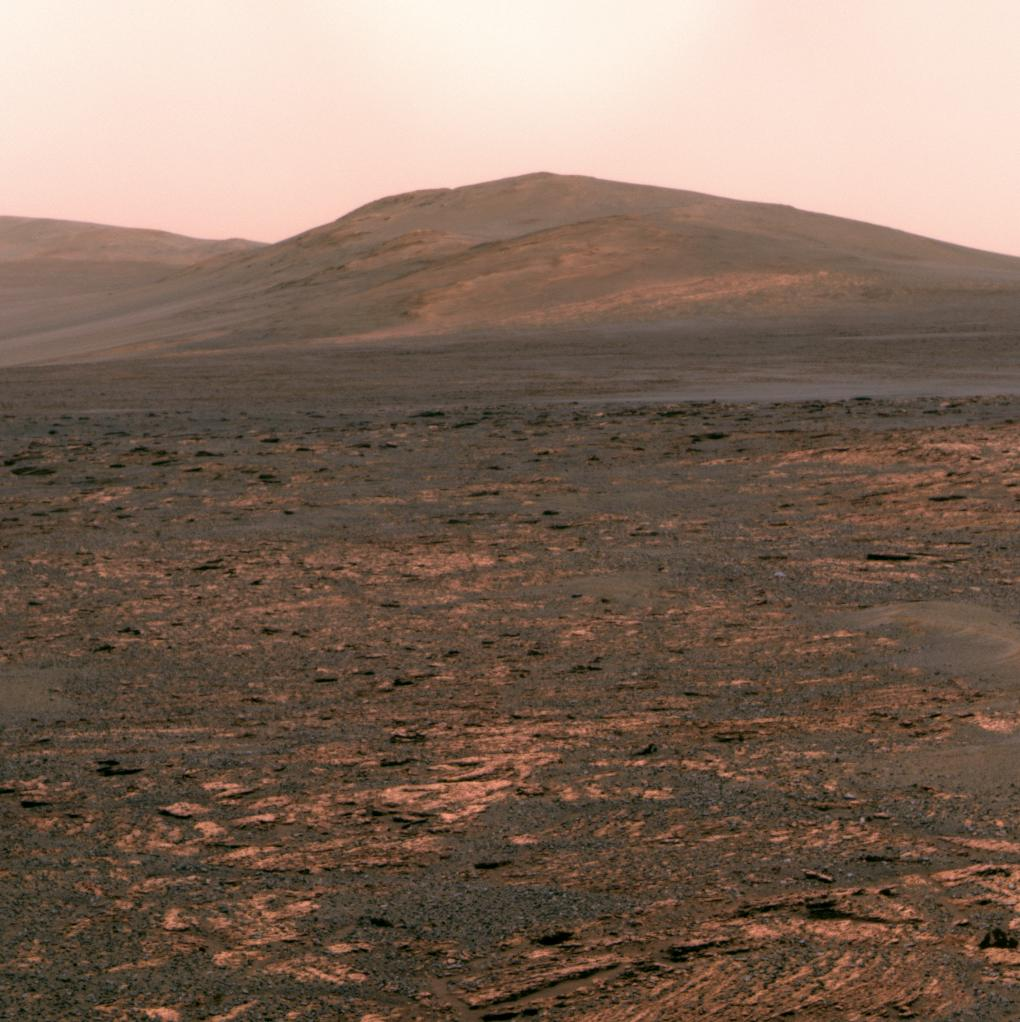
Solander point as seen overlooking Botany bay; Pancam image at 753, 535, and 432 nanometers light wavelengths (i.e. approximately true color).

By early July 2013 Opportunity was approaching Solander Point, with daily drives ranging from dozens of meters (yards) to over a hundred. It arrived at its base in early August 2013, after investigating a curious terrain patch along the way. Solander could provide a northward facing slope to aid in sunlight collection, as the Martian winter was approaching (as the season changes, the angle of the Sun is shifting). On Sol 3390 (August 6, 2013) energy intake was 385 watt-hours, down from 395 on Sol 3384 (July 31, 2013), and 431 on Sol 3376 (July 23, 2013). In May 2013 it had been as high as 546 watt-hours. Other factors that impact collection include the atmospheric opacity (i.e. "Tau") and "solar array dust factor"—dust that collects on the panels. Although the rover cannot clean the dust off, such systems were considered for the rover during its development.

In September, numerous surface targets and rocks around Solander were examined by the rover. Solar array energy production dropped to 346 watt-hours by Sol 3430 (September 16, 2013), and 325 watt-hours by Sol 3452 (October 9, 2013). By traveling to locations with favorable tilt, dubbed "lily pads", Opportunity managed to receive over about 300 watt-hours per day even as the heart of the Mars winter approached. The Martian winter minimum was predicted for February 2014, but by making use of the northward slopes the rover had enough power to remain mobile during the Martian winter. By the end of October the rover was climbing up Solander point, where it was hoped some of the oldest rocks yet seen would be examined. The rocks were believed to date to Mars's Noachian Period about four billion years ago, and could have provided some science surprises by Christmas. The team was hunting for "juicy" slopes of 5 to 20 degrees for more power.

As it ascended, it doglegged in early November to avoid an area of dusty ripples. It continued to collect data on Martian rocks and dust in the area. Total odometry by November 5, 2013 (or in Mars days since the landing, Sol 3478) was 38.53 km (23.94 mi). Energy production from the Sun on that date was 311 watt-hours, with Tau at 0.536 and the dust factor at 0.491.

Date	Watt-hours
Sol 3376 (July 23, 2013)	431
Sol 3384 (July 31, 2013)	395
Sol 3390 (August 6, 2013)	385
Sol 3430 (September 16, 2013)	346
Sol 3452 (October 9, 2013)	325
Sol 3472 (October 30, 2013)	299
Sol 3478 (November 5, 2013)	311
Sol 3494 (November 21, 2013)	302
Sol 3507 (Dec. 5, 2013)	270

Before Spirit rover stopped responding in 2010, it reported 134 watt-hours as temperatures plunged below minus 41.5 degrees Celsius (minus 42.7 degrees Fahrenheit).

By early December power levels had hit 270 watt-hours per day, even as it climbed higher up the ridge. It maintained a northerly tilt to increase energy production on Solander point. In early December one of the communication relay satellites at Mars, Odyssey, had some difficulties so the rover sent its telemetry directly to Earth. The orbiter returned to operation after December 10, 2013, and the rover prepared for additional drives. On Sol 3521 (Dec. 19, 2013) the rover took micro-images and used the Alpha Particle X-ray Spectrometer. Between December 31 and New Year's Day cleaning events removed dust, improving the Solar Array Dust Factor to 0.566 (where higher is better and 1.0 is totally clean). Energy production increased 35 watt-hours/day after this cleaning, to 371 watt-hours/day.

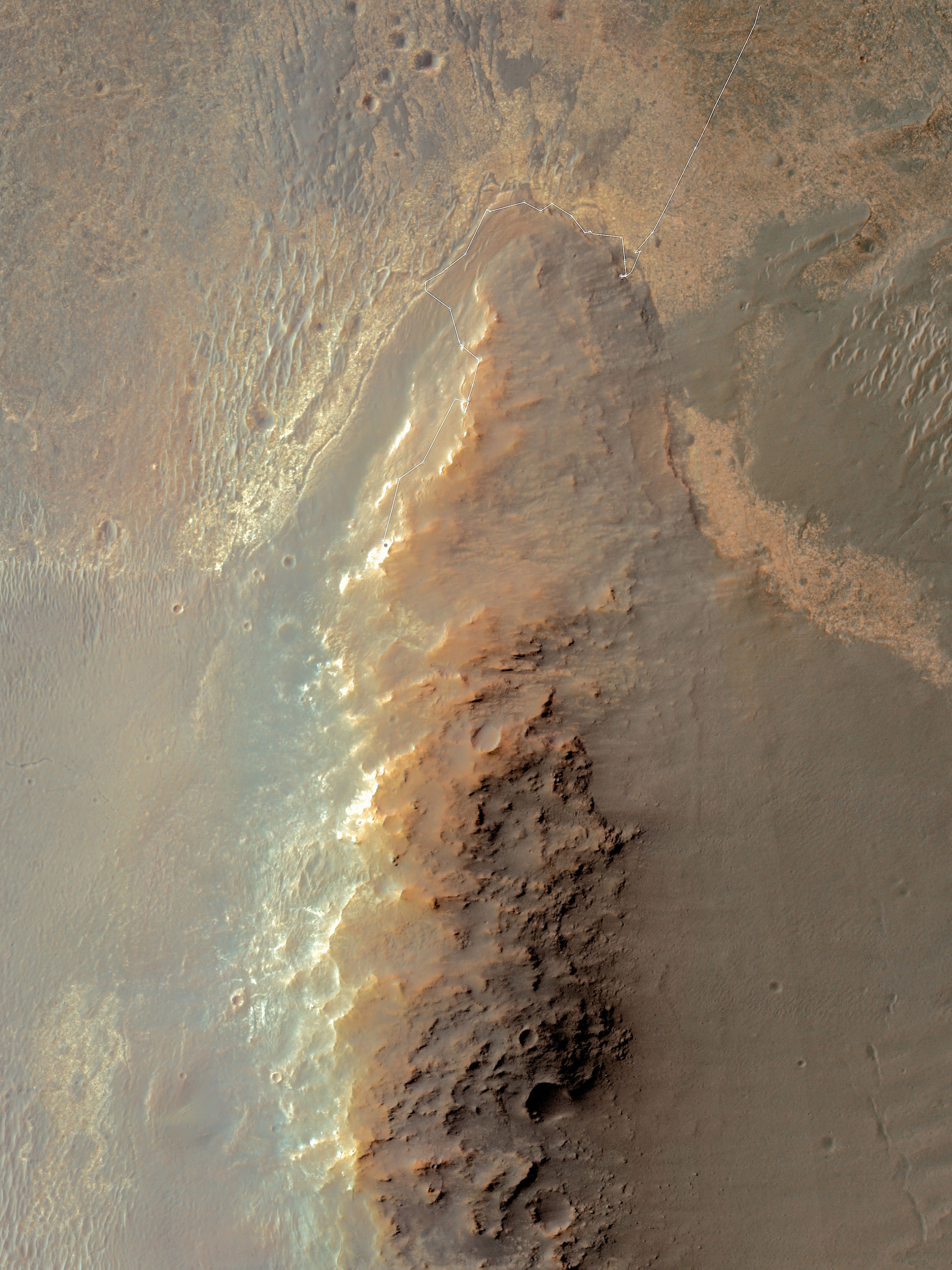
Sol 3492 traverse map for MER-B, dated November 2013

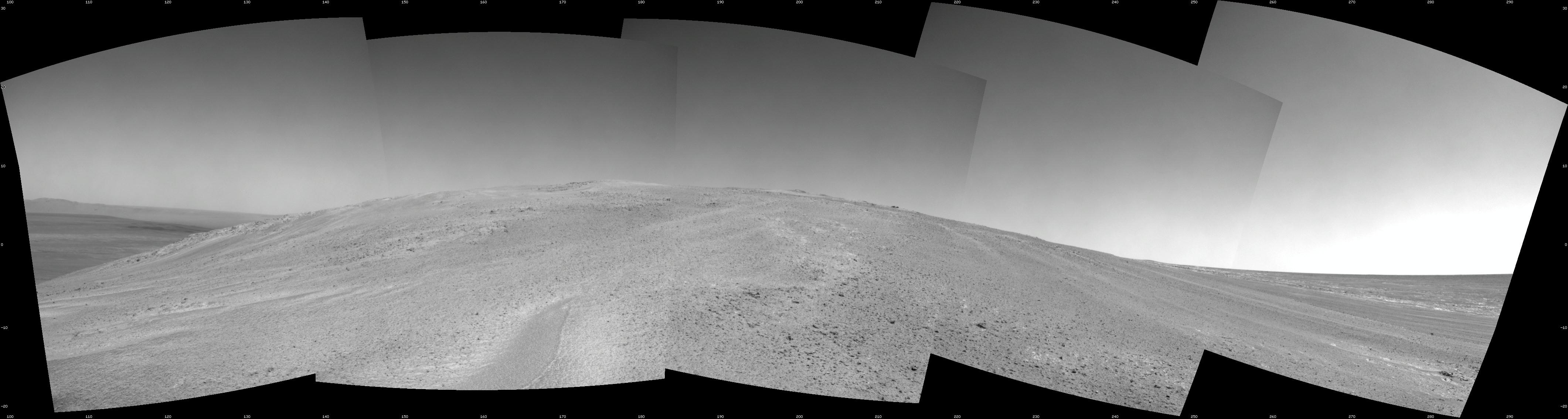
This is a southward uphill view as the rover ascended the mountain in October 2013. It is assembled from NavCam images.

=== 2014 ===
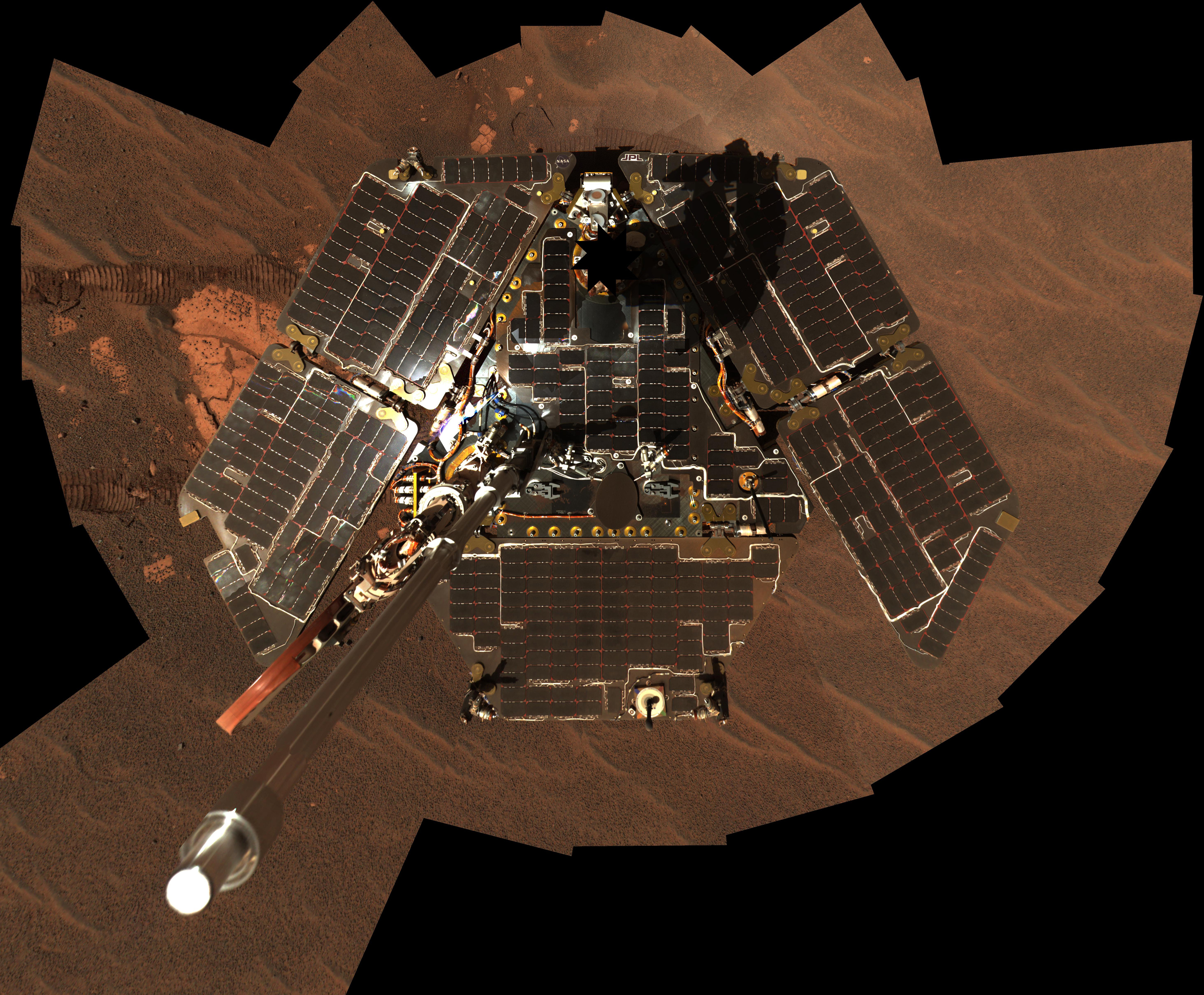
Self-portrait of Opportunity taken early in the mission (December 19–20, 2004)

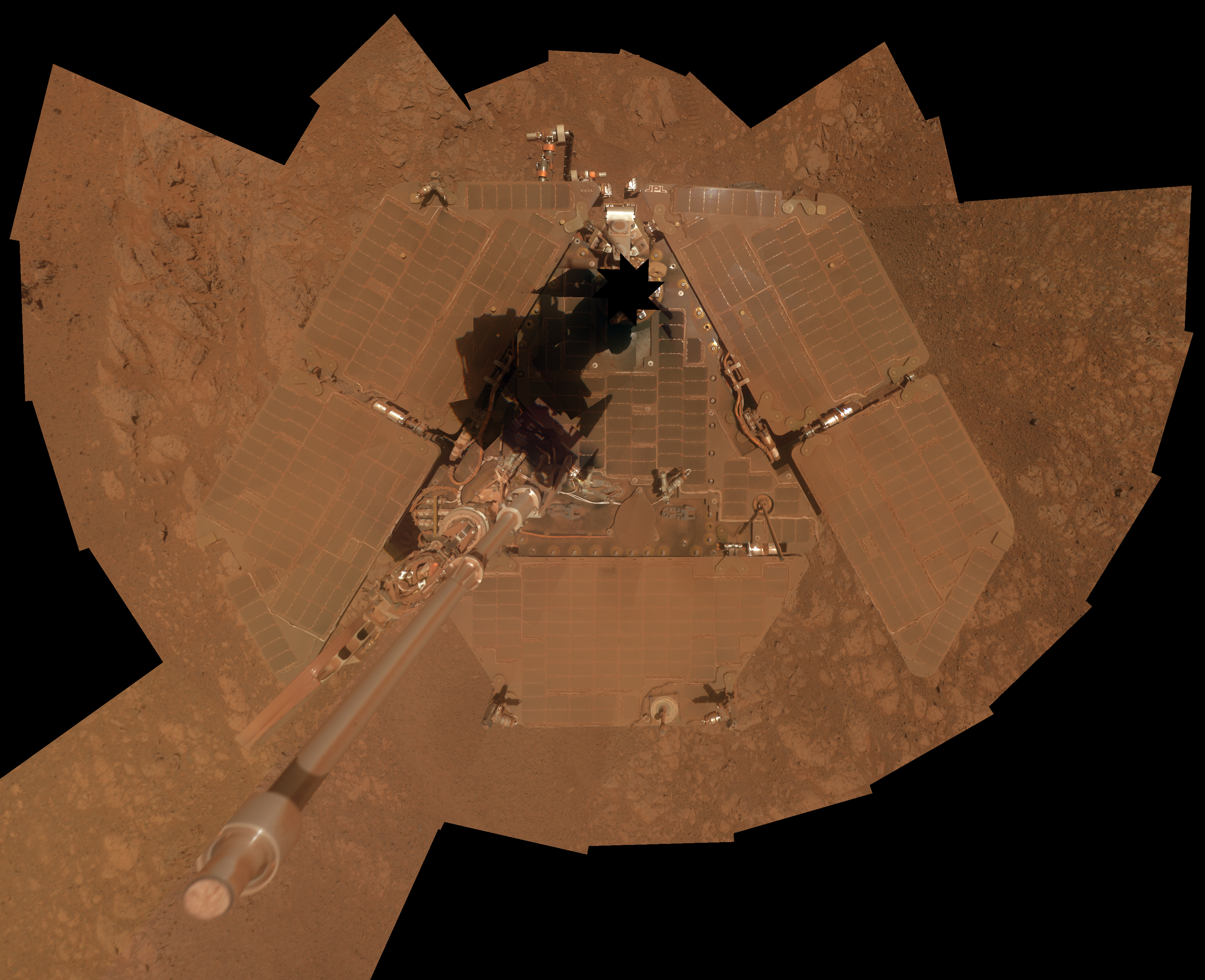
Self-portrait of Opportunity near Endeavour Crater (January 6, 2014). Note the change in appearance in relation to the photo nine years earlier (left).

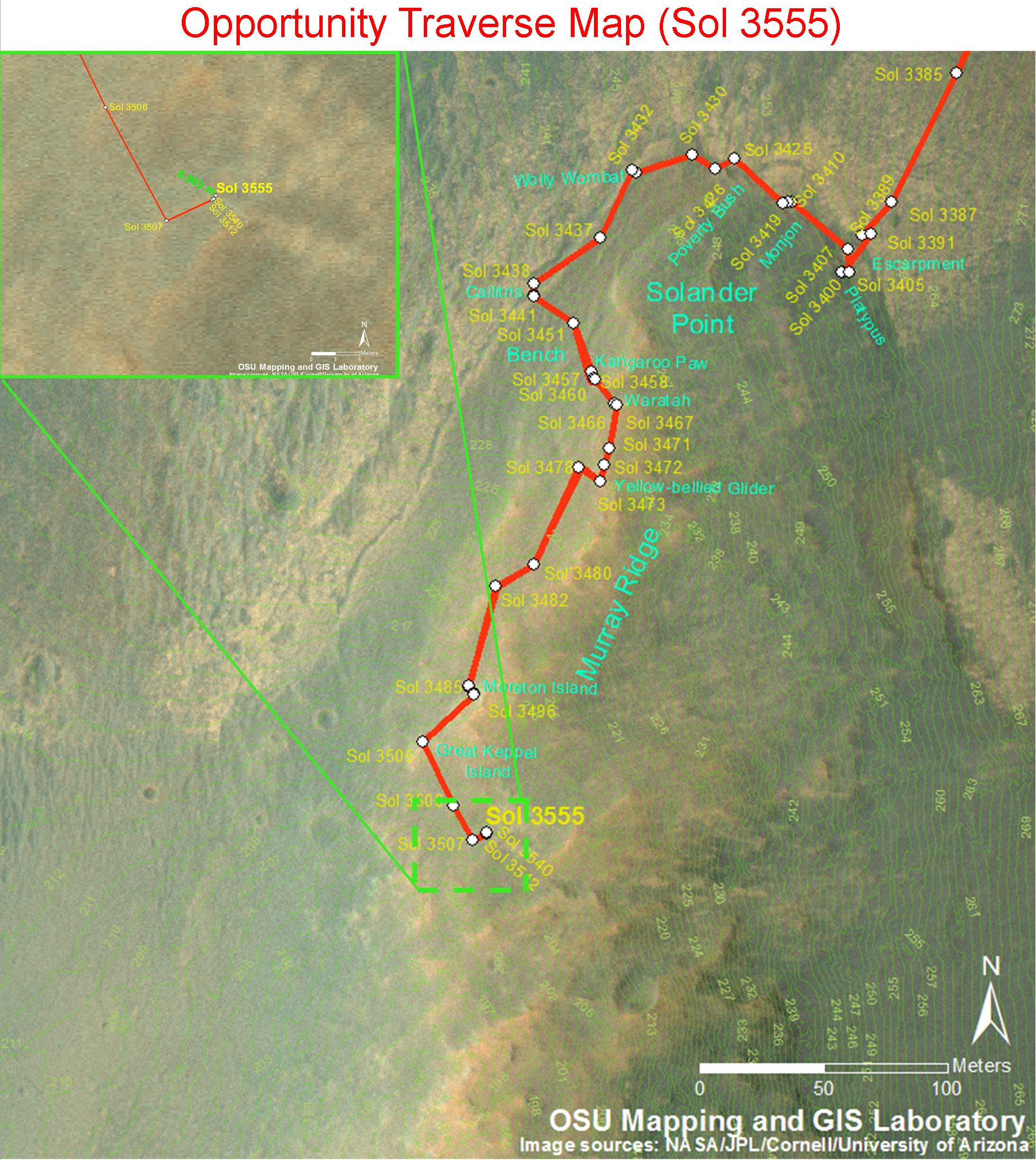
Opportunity's path at Solander Point and along Murray Ridge up to February 2014 (Sol 3555)

Opportunity started off 2014 on the western ridge of Endeavour crater, providing elevated panoramas of the surrounding region. Research on data from Mars orbiters identified interesting minerals on the outcrop. Some communication and difficulties the previous month delayed investigating these rocks, but on the positive side, the wait, along with a cleaning event over January 1, allowed for more electrical power to be available. The rover is tilted towards the Sun to help it get more power, and it is expected that it can remain active during the Martian winter.

==== Pinnacle Island ====
On January 17, NASA reported that a rock, named "Pinnacle Island", that was not in a rover image taken on Sol 3528, "mysteriously" appeared 13 days later in a similar image taken on Sol 3540. One possible explanation, presented by Steven Squyres, principal investigator of the Mars Exploration Rover Mission, was that the rover, in one of its turning motions, flicked the rock from a few meters away and into the new location.

In response, Rhawn Joseph published an article in the fringe journal Journal of Cosmology on January 17, 2014, and filed a writ of mandamus on January 27, 2014, in San Francisco Federal Court, stating that the object is a living entity and demanded that NASA re-examine the rock more closely. However, NASA already had examined the rock with the rover's microscope and analyzers, and confirmed it was a rock with a high sulphur, manganese, and magnesium content. According to Steven Squyres, "We have looked at it with our microscope. It is clearly a rock." On February 14, 2014, NASA released an image showing the location from where the "Pinnacle Island" rock was dislodged by the Opportunity rover.

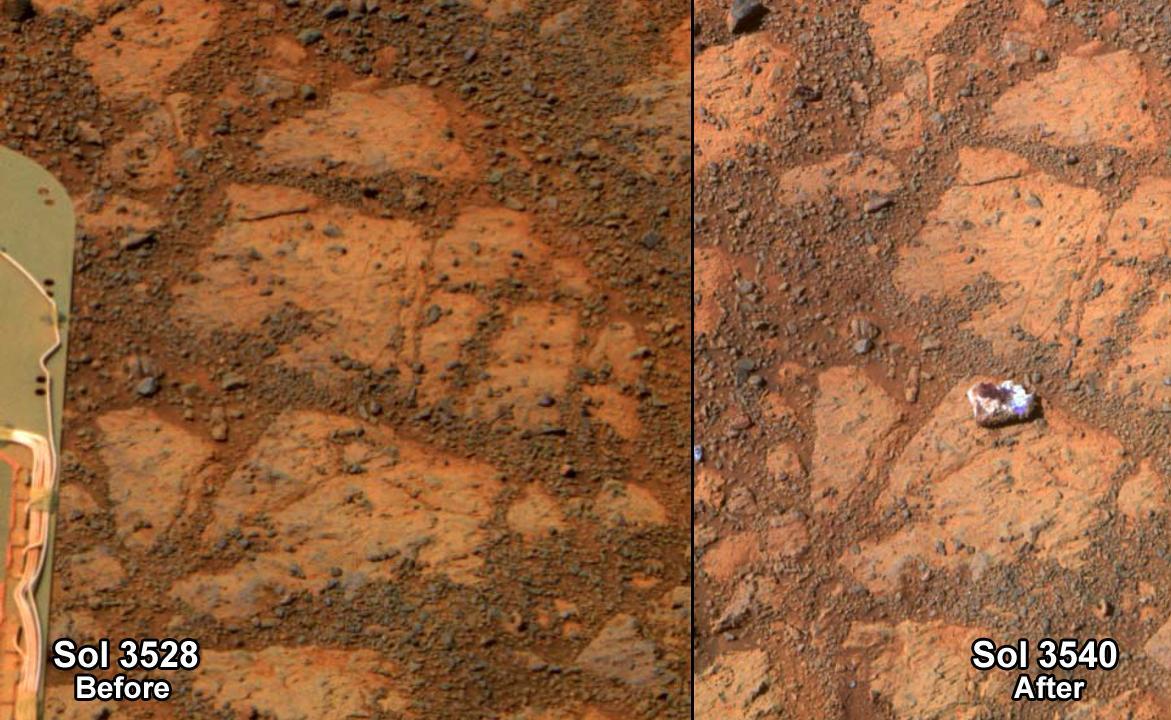
"Mysterious" appearance of a rock shaped as a "jelly doughnut" - sol 3528 & 3540 (b/w).

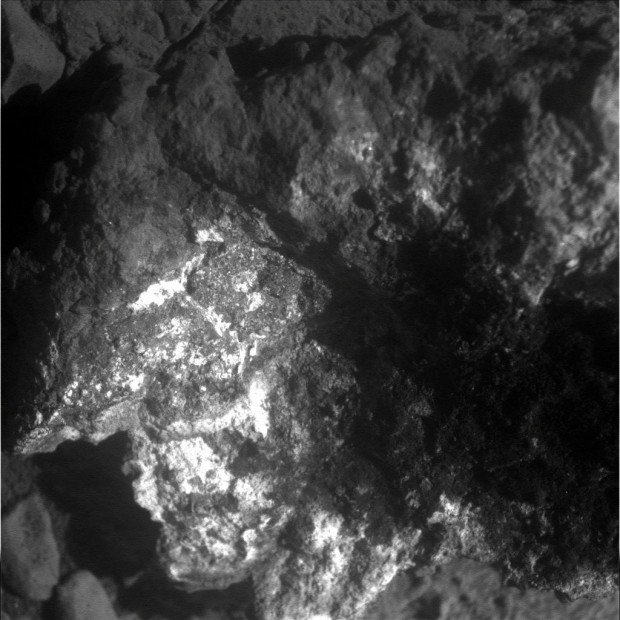
Closeup - Rock contains sulfur, magnesium and manganese.

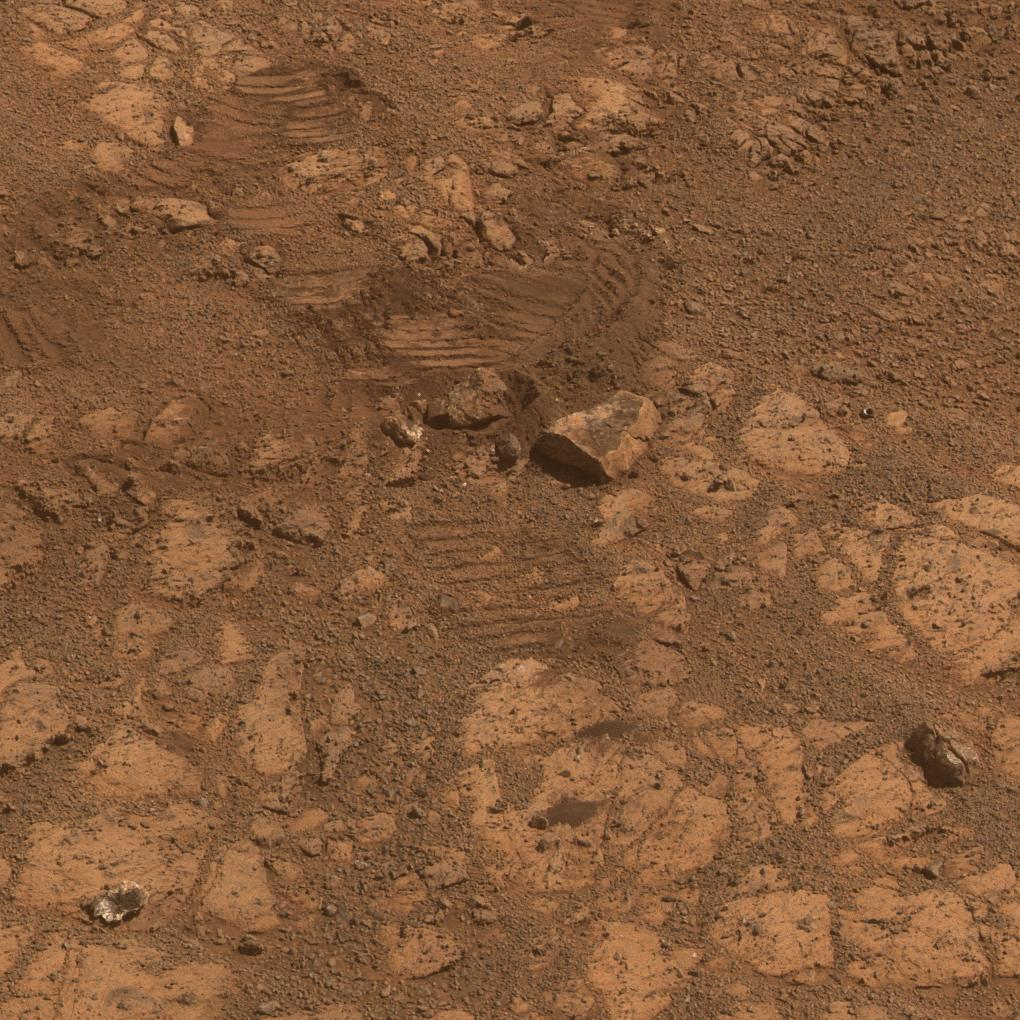
Location where "Pinnacle Island" rock was dislodged by rover; mystery solved (February 4, 2014).

==== Renewed focus ====
On January 23, 2014, NASA celebrated the tenth anniversary (officially, January 25, 2014) of the rover's landing on Mars by sharing a self-portrait of the rover from above. They also reported on the latest discoveries of some Martian rocks and stated, "These rocks are older than any we examined earlier in the mission, and they reveal more favorable conditions for microbial life than any evidence previously examined by investigations with Opportunity."

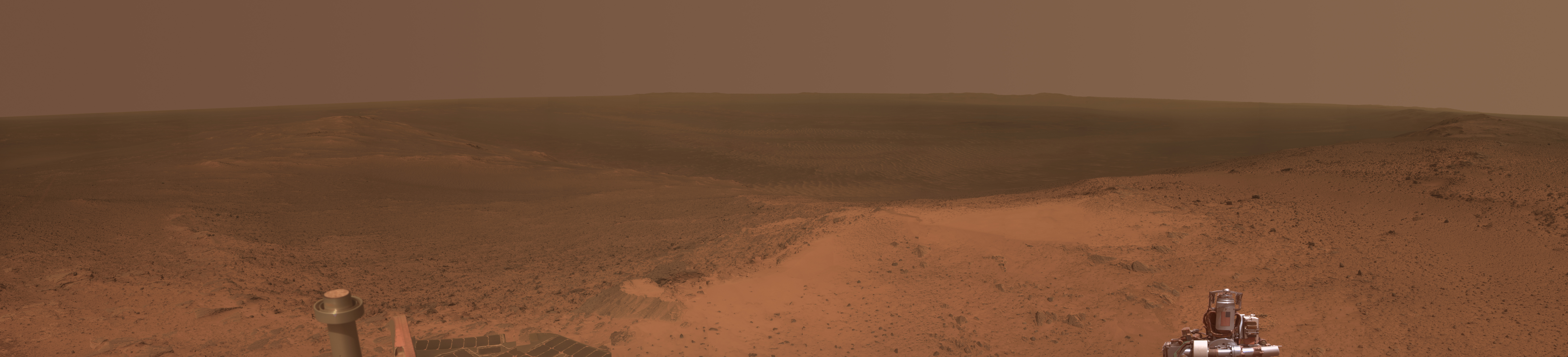
MER-B eventually reached Cape Tribulation, and took a panorama from its top: Opportunity's view from Cape Tribulation on the rim of Endeavour Crater, January 22, 2015. This was the highest elevation point yet achieved by MER-B

On January 24, 2014, NASA reported that current studies on the planet Mars by the Curiosity and Opportunity rovers will now be searching for evidence of ancient life, including a biosphere based on autotrophic, chemotrophic and/or chemolithoautotrophic microorganisms, as well as ancient water, including fluvio-lacustrine environments (plains related to ancient rivers or lakes) that may have been habitable. The search for evidence of habitability, taphonomy (related to fossils), and organic carbon on the planet Mars is now a primary NASA objective.

Among many activities in March 2014, the rover studied the rock "Augustine," and on Sol 3602 (March 12, 2014), produced 498 watt-hours from sunlight. Two cleaning events in March 2014 significantly boosted available power. Since January 2013, the solar array dust factor (one of the determinants of solar power production) varied from a relatively dusty 0.467 on December 5, 2013 (sol 3507) to a relatively clean 0.964 on May 13, 2014 (sol 3662).

Date	Watt-hours
Sol 3534 (Jan. 1, 2014)	371
Sol 3602 (March 12, 2014)	498
Sol 3606 (March 16, 2014)	615
Sol 3621 (April 1, 2014)	661
Sol 3676 (May 27, 2014)	764
Sol 3703 (Jun 24, 2014)	743
Sol 3751 (Aug 12, 2014)	679
Sol 3812 (Oct 14, 2014)	605
Sol 3867 (Dec 9, 2014)	500

On July 28, 2014, NASA announced that Opportunity, after having traveled over 40 km (25 mi) on the planet Mars, has set a new "off-world" record as the rover having driven the greatest distance, surpassing the previous record held by the Soviet Union's Lunokhod 2 rover that had traveled 39 km (24 mi).

After a series of "resets" pointed to problems with flash memory, the rover stopped driving from late August to early September, 2014, in order to reformat its flash memory. Though minor memory problems persisted in the immediate aftermath of reformatting, they did not hinder the rover's continued operation; Opportunity resumed driving towards "Ulysses" crater and "Marathon Valley," exceeding total odometry of 41 kilometers by November 11, 2014.

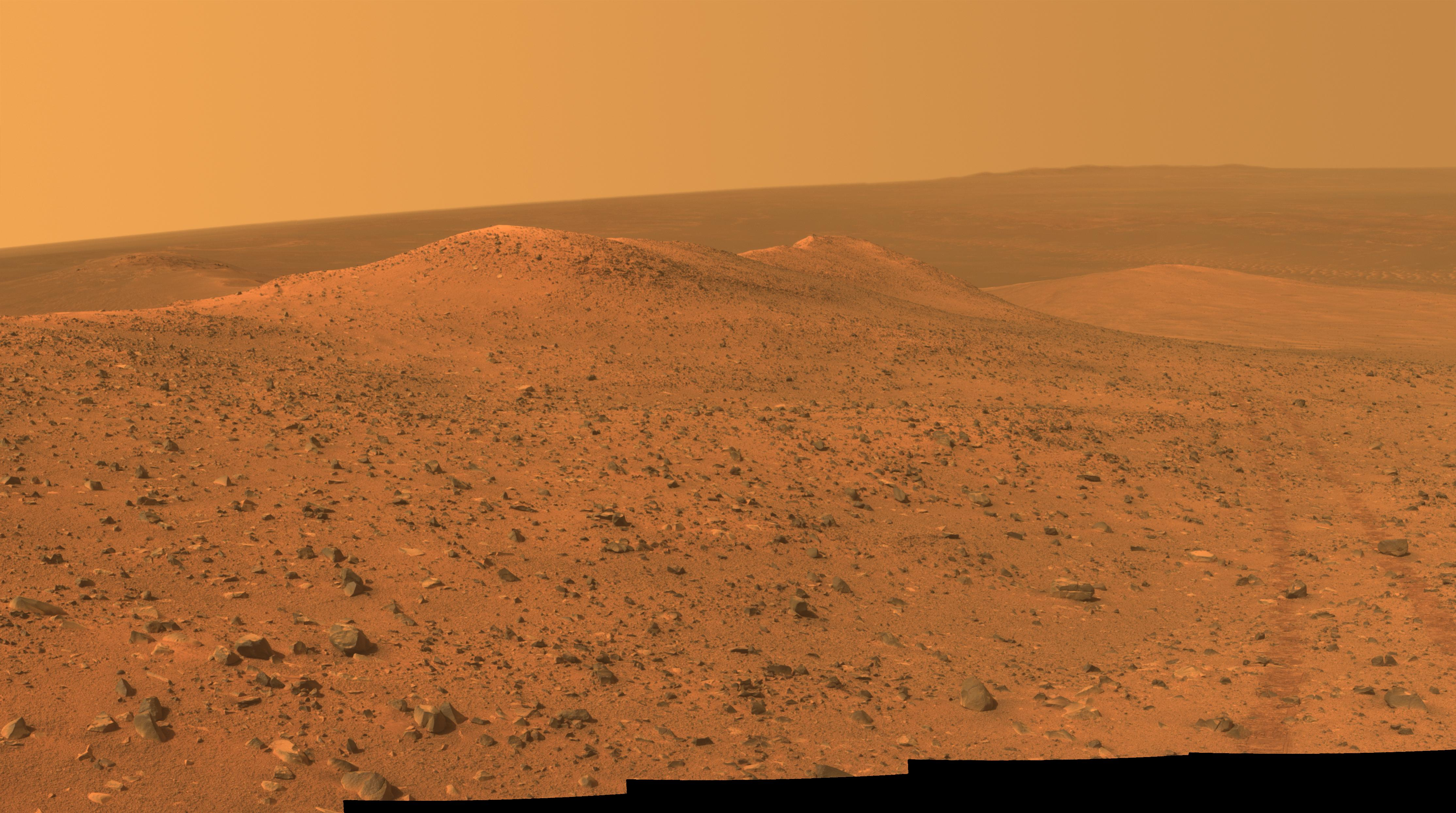
Wdowiak Ridge on the North-Western rim of Endeavour crater.MER-B recorded this panorama on Sept. 17, 2014 (Sol 3,786)

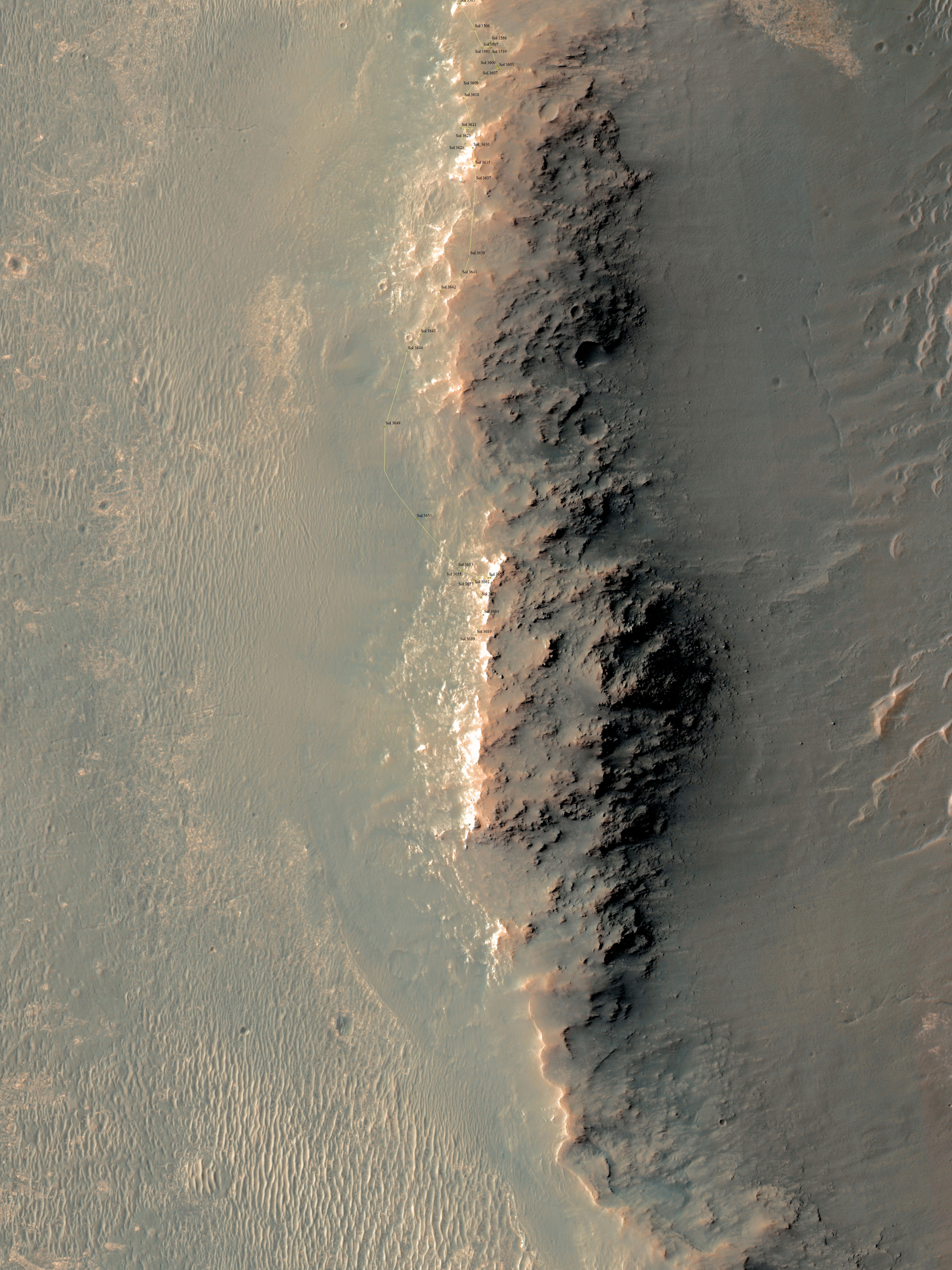
Traverse as of June 2014 from roughly sol 3500 to 3689

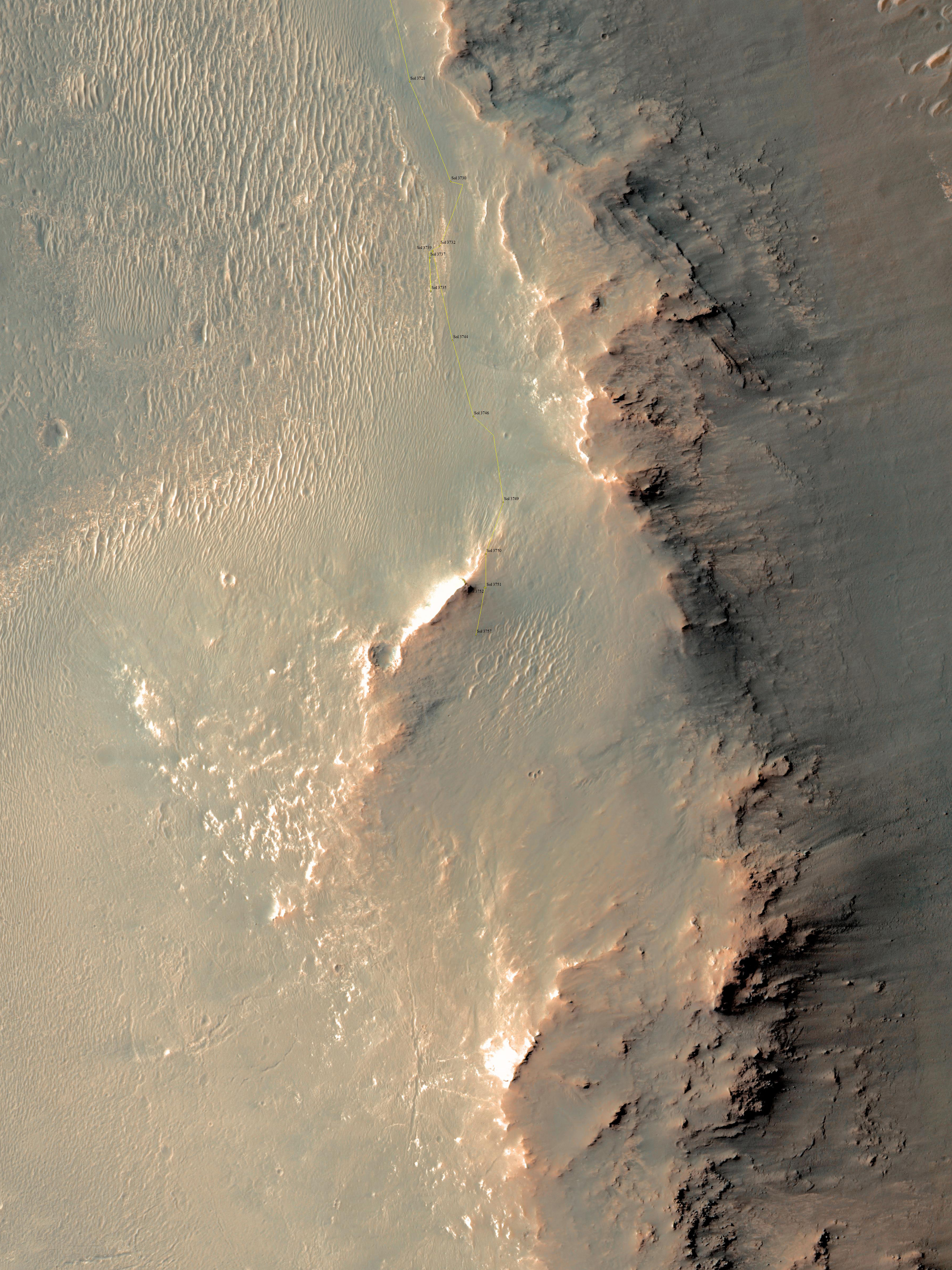
Traverse as of August 2014 from roughly sol 3728 to 3757

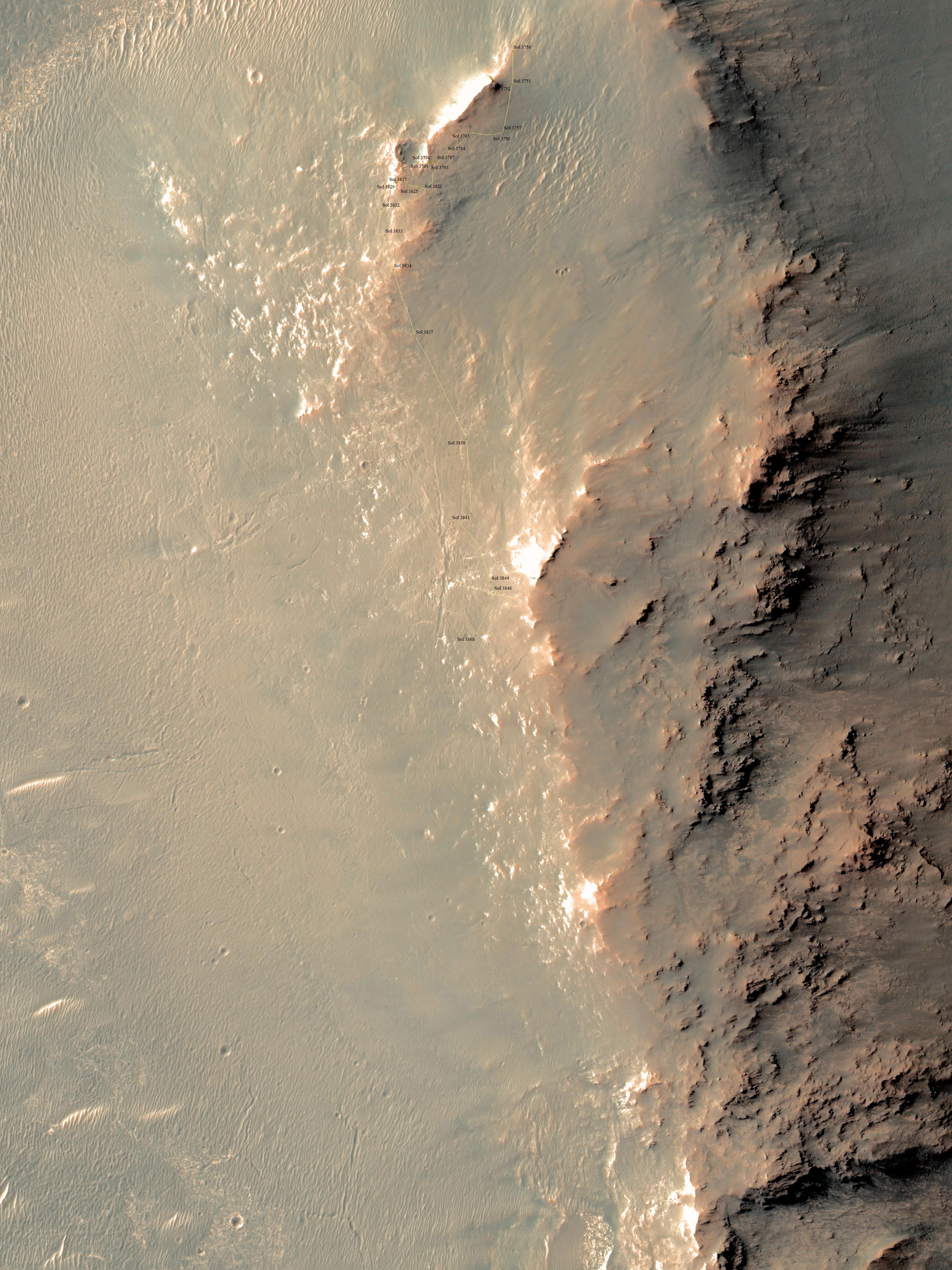
Traverse as of December 2014 from roughly sol 3750 to 3868

=== 2015 ===
2015 was a year of superlative achievements for the MER-B mission, starting off with summiting Cape Tribulation in January 2015, which was the highest elevation achieved yet on its mission. Then in March 2016 it accomplished the distance of a classic marathon. Also in March 2016 it achieved the steepest slope traverse (32 degree) yet of its mission, surpassing the slope it took on at Burns Cliff in 2004. MER-B was trying to reach a target on Knudsen Ridge, on the south side of Marathon Valley, which meant attempting a steep grade which can cause wheel slippage. Another effect of this angle was that sand and dust that had collected on the rover flowed in streaks over the back of the rover, such was the incline.

In 2015 MER-B entered Marathon Valley and would study it until September 2016.

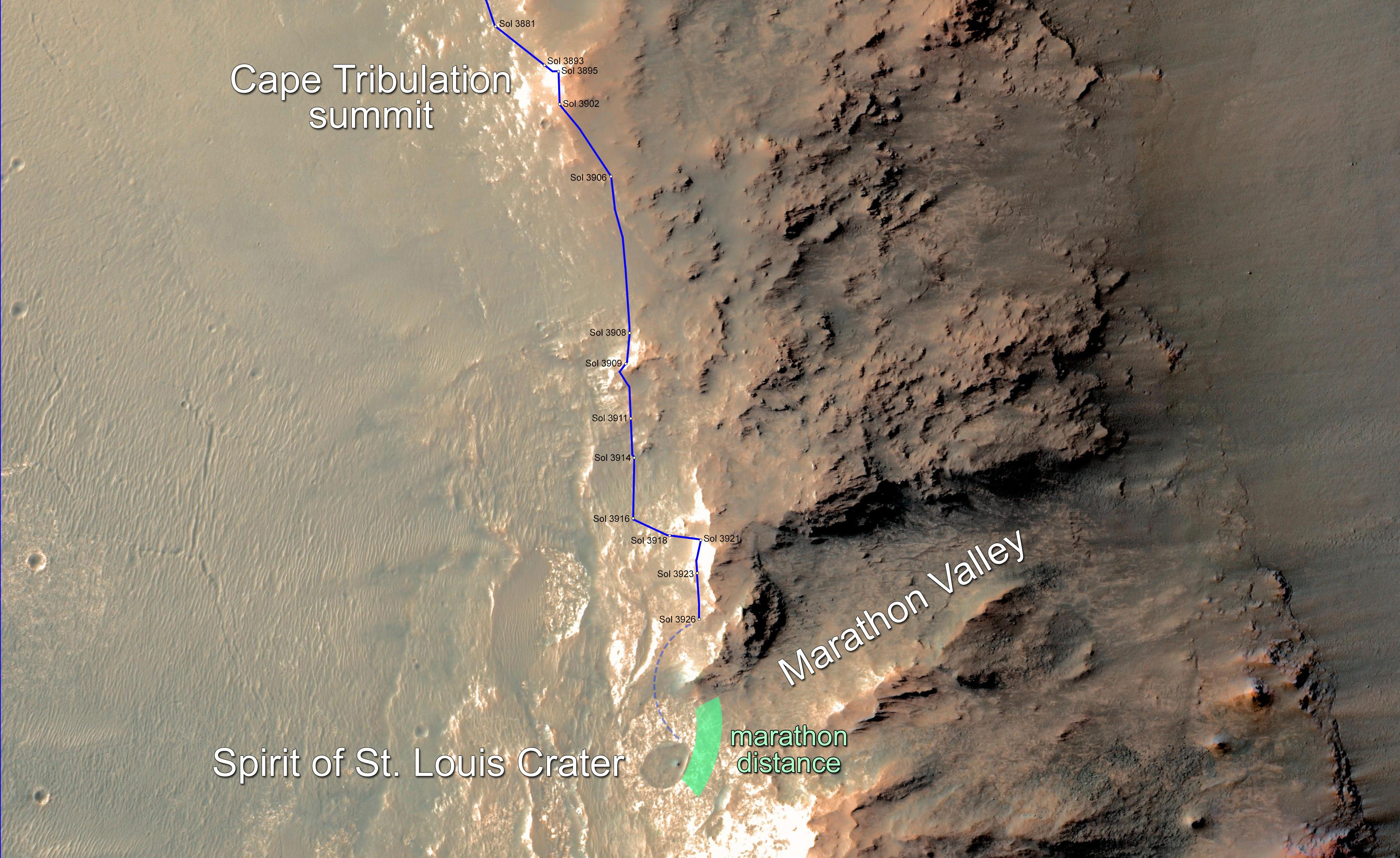
Opportunity's traverse up to February 2015 as it approached Spirit of Saint Louis Crater and Marathon Valley, and came close to traveling the distance of a traditional marathon (about 26 miles or 42 km)

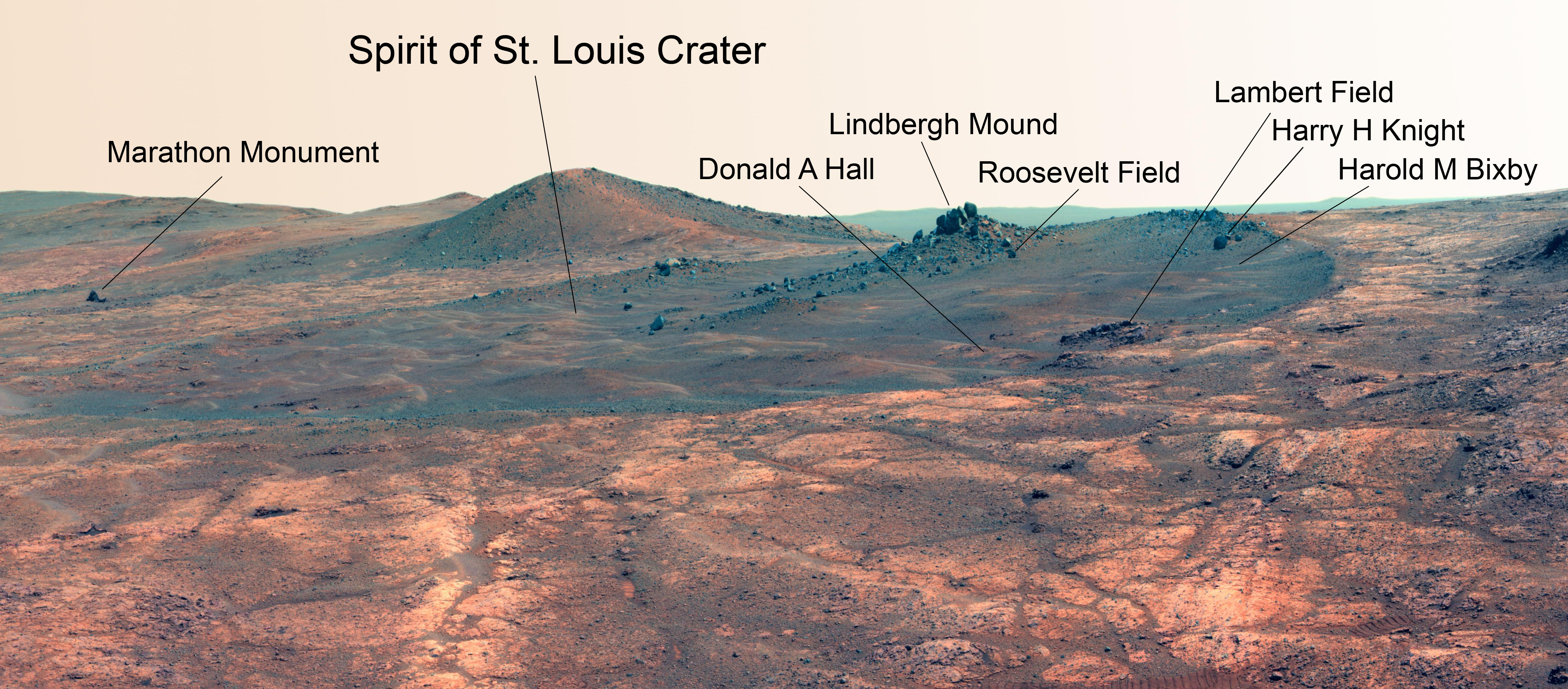
In May 2015 the rover visited Spirit of St. Louis Crater, a shallow crater about 110 feet (34 meters) long and 80 feet (24 meters) across. In its center is Lindbergh Mound, about 2-3 meters (yards) high. This version of the panorma is annotated and in false color

On March 23, 2015, NASA reported Opportunity's flash memory was successfully reformatted. After completing analysis of the flash memory issues, engineers concluded that some of the problems stemmed from a single memory bank, one of Opportunity's seven "banks" of onboard flash memory. A software upgrade was sent which allows the rover to bypass this bank, known as Bank 7. By February 2015, total odometry exceeded 42 kilometers. From July to September, the rover mostly operated using a RAM-only mode, to avoid ongoing flash memory issues. In September, a series of tests were performed to better understand the volatility of the device.

Date	Watt-hours
Sol 3894 (Jan. 6, 2015)	438
Sol 3936 (Feb 18, 2015)	559
Sol 4003 (April 28, 2015)	526
Sol 4042 (June 7, 2015)	490
Sol 4098 (Aug 4, 2015)	431
Sol 4161 (Oct 7, 2015)	327
Sol 4221 (Dec 8, 2015)	407

During the beginning of October 2015, Opportunity began its drive to north-tilted slopes in Marathon Valley of the west rim of Endeavour crater in preparation for the Martian winter. By November 2, after attempting to use the rover's flash memory, Opportunity again suffered an "amnesia" event. and the decision was made to switch back to use RAM on November 11 (Sol 4195).

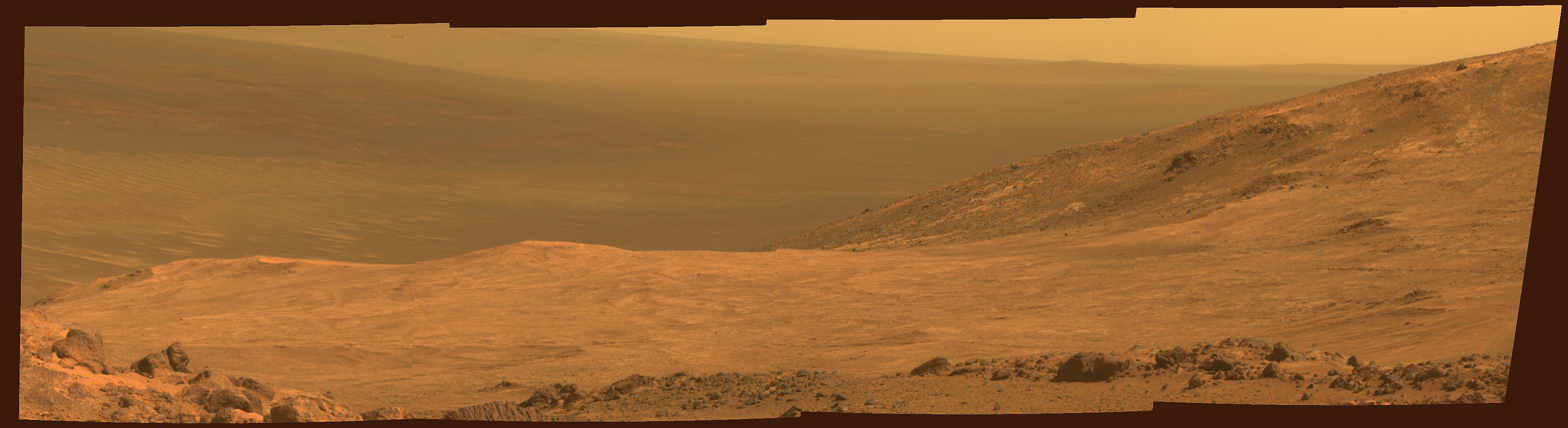
Marathon Valley as viewed by the Opportunity rover (false color; stereo; March 13, 2015).

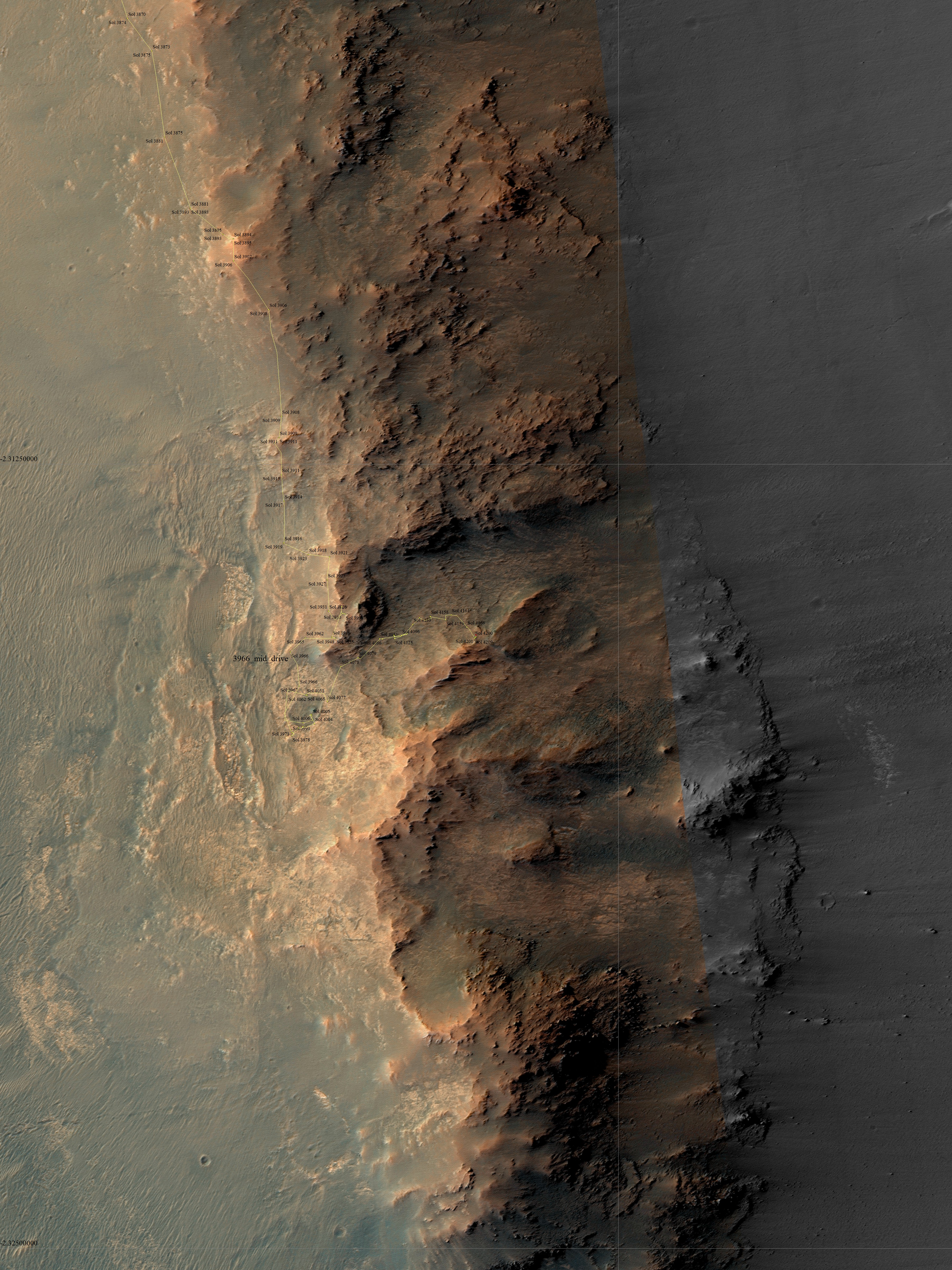
Color sat-view of MER-B's track along the Western edge of the crater up to December 2015

=== 2016 ===
On January 3, 2016 (Sol 4246), Opportunity went through the winter solstice on Mars with already improved solar insolation, with the rover producing 449 watt-hours from its solar panels. On January 25, 2016, Opportunity had marked twelve years since landing on Mars and continued its scientific investigation of Marathon Valley.

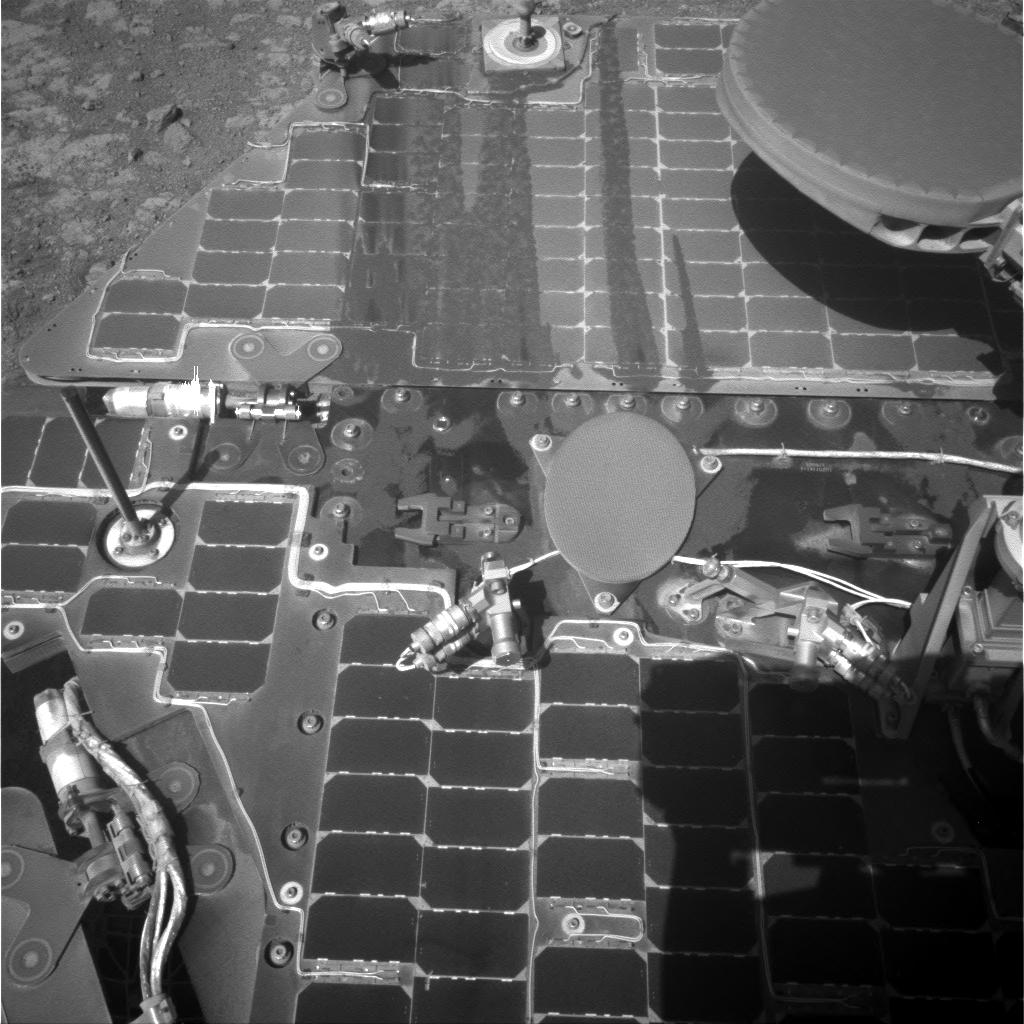
On March 21, 2016, while trying to reach target on the slope of Marathon Valley in Cape Tribulation, the Mars rover attained a slope of 32 degrees, the highest angle yet for the rover since its mission began. This was so steep that dust that had accumulated on its top panels began to flow downward.

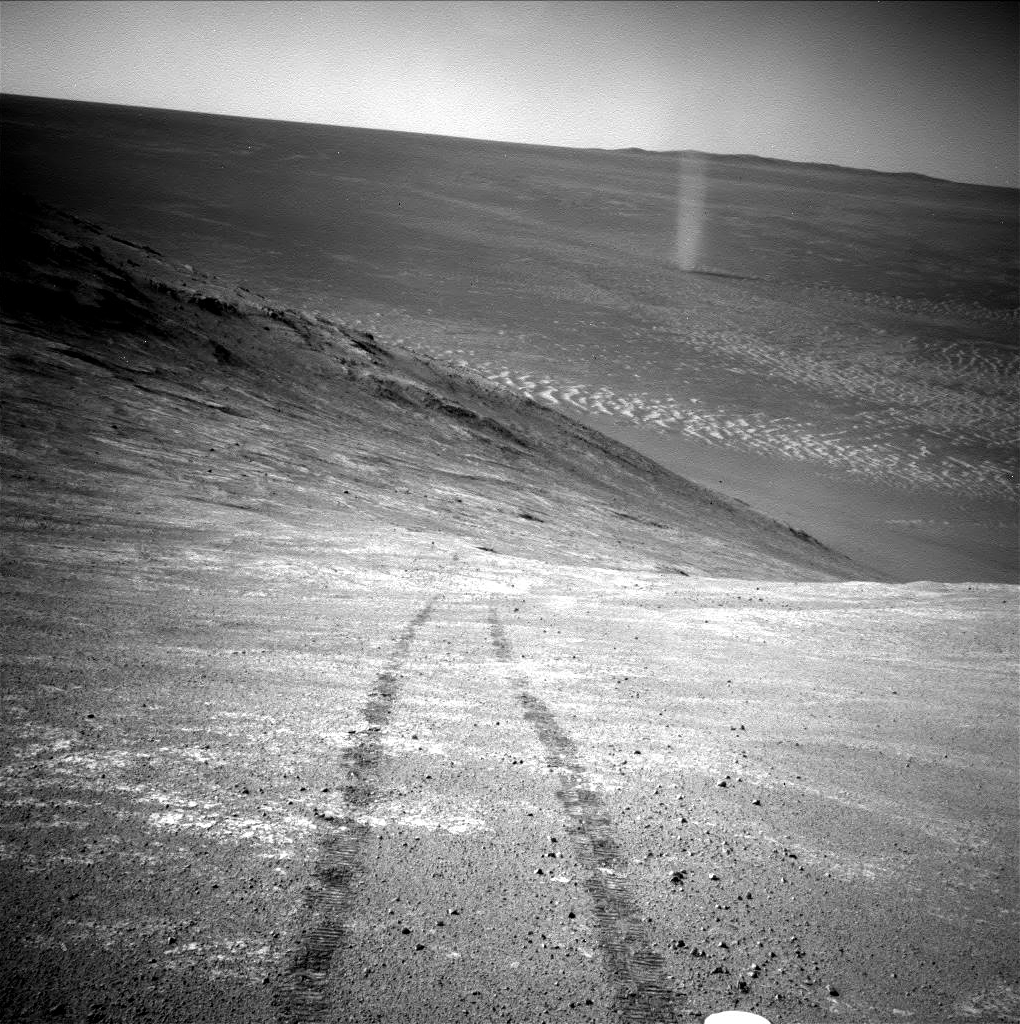
Opportunity images a Martian whirlwind (April 2016)

On March 31, 2016, Opportunity captured an image of a dust devil inside Endeavour crater. Although the Spirit rover saw dust devils frequently, they have been less common in the area that Opportunity is exploring.

==== Marathon Valley Panorama ====
In June 2016, MER-B took a special panoramic image called the Sacagawea Panorama in honor of Sacagawea, the Lemhi Shoshone woman that helped the Lewis and Clark Expedition on their journey of exploration across America in 1804 to 1806. The image was taken of Marathon Valley at Endeavour Crater on the planet Mars.

Sacagawea Panorama by Opportunity, 2016

On the right side of this image is "Knudsen Ridge", and beyond Marathon valley is the floor of Endeavor crater. In the distance is the rim of crater on the other side.

==== Marathon Valley departure ====
In September 2016, Opportunity departed from Marathon Valley which it traversed through over the previous Earth year. As it continued to explore the Western rim of Endeavor crater, it was directed out of Lewis and Clark gap in Marathon valley, and made its way towards Spirit mound. By early October 2016, the rover had reached Spirit mound by passing through Bitterroot valley, where it began to collect data on a science target.

Starting in October 2016, the three new mission goals include driving down into Endeavour Crater along what is thought to be a water-carved gully, compare the material on the plains to the interior of the crater, and to find pre-impact rocks (rocks that pre-date the impact that presumably formed Endeavour crater).

By October 4, 2016, the rover had traveled 26.99 miles (43.44 km), and generated 472 watt-hours of electricity. This date was mission time of Sol (Mars days) 4514.

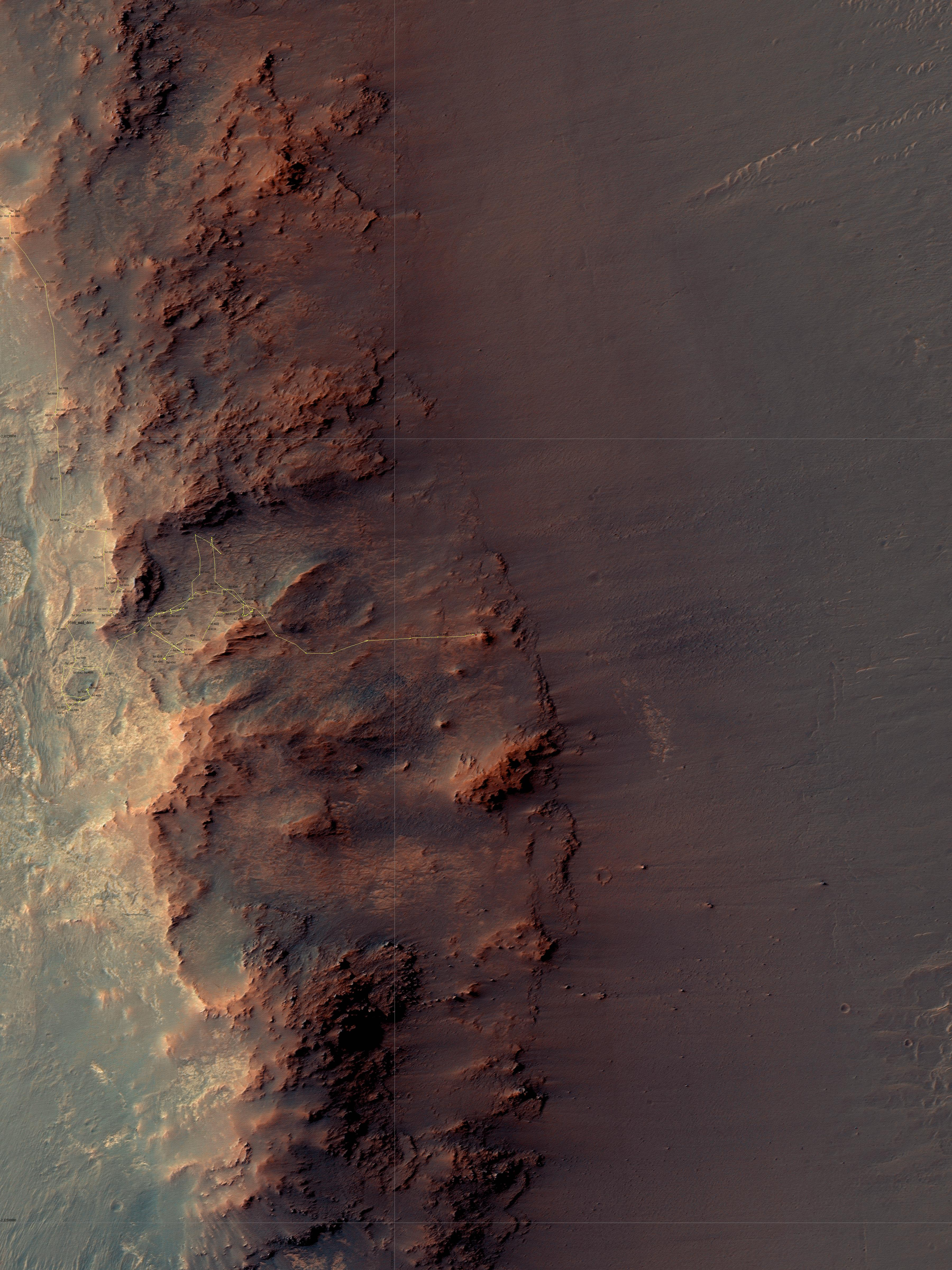
A detailed-class rover traverse map by the mission, released on September 28, 2016 showing the track of the rover up to Sol 4500 as it heads deeper in Endeavor crater

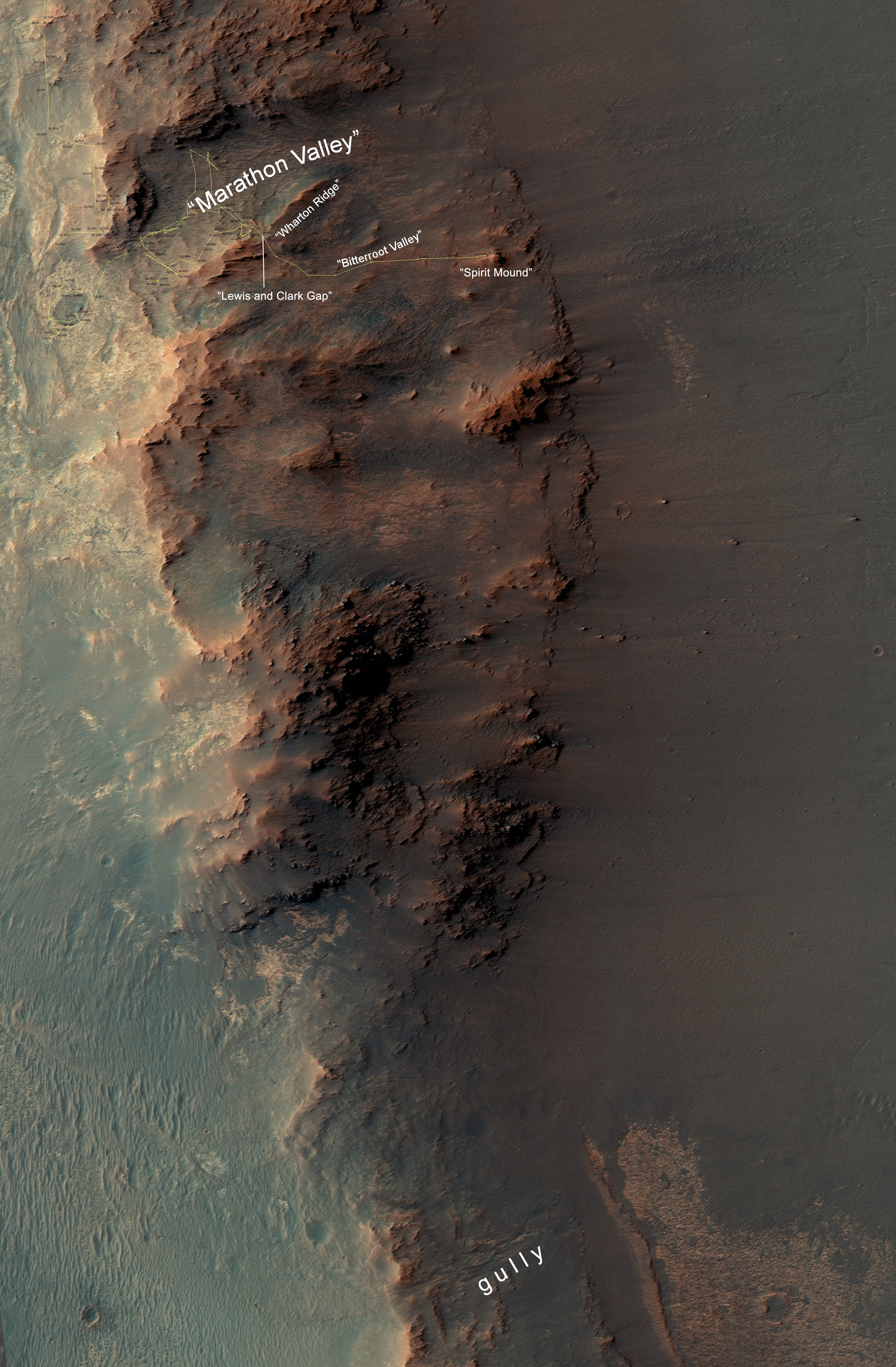
Annotated version of MER-B traverse to Spirit Mound from Marathon Valley in late 2016

The gully in the above annotated picture is a few hundred meters from the rover, and is the location of the suspected fluid-carved, possibly water, gullies that have never been investigated from the surface before. One of the MER-B goals is to drive down to this gully and examine it.

==== Imaging Schiaparelli's descent ====
In October 2016 the ESA Schiaparelli lander attempted to land near Endeavour crater, and the two teams worked together for Opportunity to possibly image the lander during its descent. Opportunity did take pictures of the area of the sky the lander was coming down in although the lander was not identified at that time; the nature of MER-B's cameras, the terrain, and the uncertainty of the lander's location, meant imaging was not a certainty. By late October 2016 it was confirmed Schiaparelli had crashed into the surface rather than achieving a soft touchdown.

==== Moving on ====
The rover headed south from Spirit point after the events of ExoMars, continuing its mission on the edge of Endeavour crater. On Sol 4541 (Nov. 1, 2016), the solar array energy production is 390 watt-hours and on Sol 4548 (Nov. 8, 2016), the solar array energy production is 445 watt-hours. A readout from the EEPROM was returned to Earth, this is used in the test-bed rovers on Earth.

=== 2017 ===
On Sol 4623 (January 24, 2017 PST) the team celebrated 13 years operating Opportunity on the surface of Mars. By February 7, 2017 (Sol 4636) the rover had traveled 44 kilometers (27 miles) on the surface of Mars. Power collection from the Sun on that date was 414 watt-hours. The long-term goal at the time was a gully south of the rover on the Western rim of Endeavour crater. Science operations also continued including microscopic imaging of select rocks, APXS operation, and atmospheric argon gas measurements.

Throughout 2017, Opportunity worked its way south along the Western rim as it moved towards the gully, which the team named Perseverance Valley in April 2017. Some other names considered for this feature were Perseverance Gulch, Perseverance Ravine, and Perseverance Gorge. It is a valley network that runs downslope in the Cape Bryon section of Western rim of Endeavour crater.

The Martian winter reached its hardest time for the rover this year, with reduced sunlight and colder temperatures. One strategy the Rover team uses is to position the Rover on northward faced slopes to get more sunlight, and because the gully runs east–west, they were often able to use the southern edge of the gully channel of Perseverance Valley to tilt the rover this way. The Martian winter solstice was in November 2017, and it is the 8th one that MER-B has passed through.

Some energy production readings from 2017:

Opportunity solar array energy production (2017)
Date	Watt-hours
Sol 4602 (January 3, 2017)	520
Sol 4636 (February 7, 2017)	414
Sol 4663 (March 6, 2017)	441
Sol 4691 (April 4, 2017)	415
Sol 4718 (May. 2, 2017)	405
Sol 4752 (June 6, 2017)	362
Sol 4786 (July 11, 2017)	352
Sol 4814 (August 8, 2017)	319
Sol 4841 (Sept. 5, 2017)	285
Sol 4875 (Oct. 10, 2017)	339
4909 (Nov. 14, 2017)	393
Sol 4934 (Dec. 10, 2017)	408

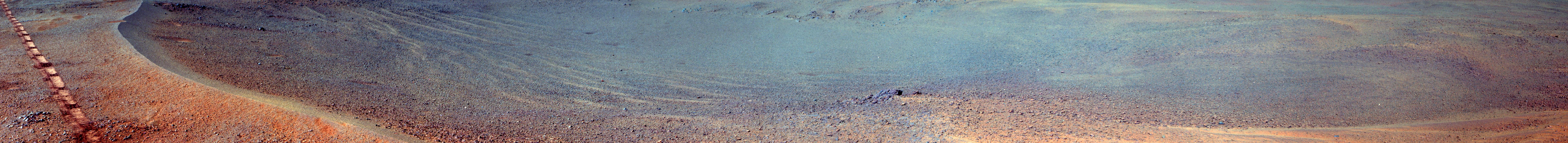
Panorama of Orion Crater (enhanced color; April 26, 2017).

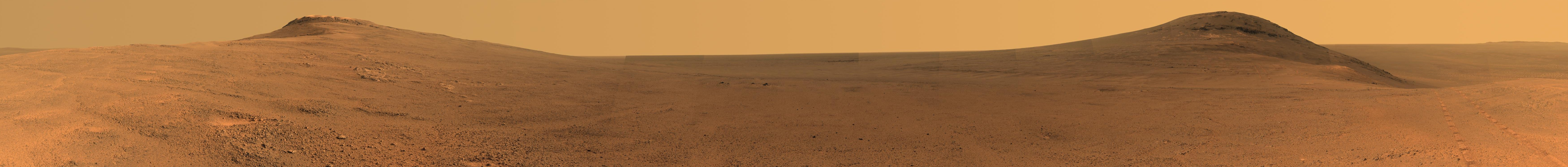
Above Perseverance Valley, July 2017

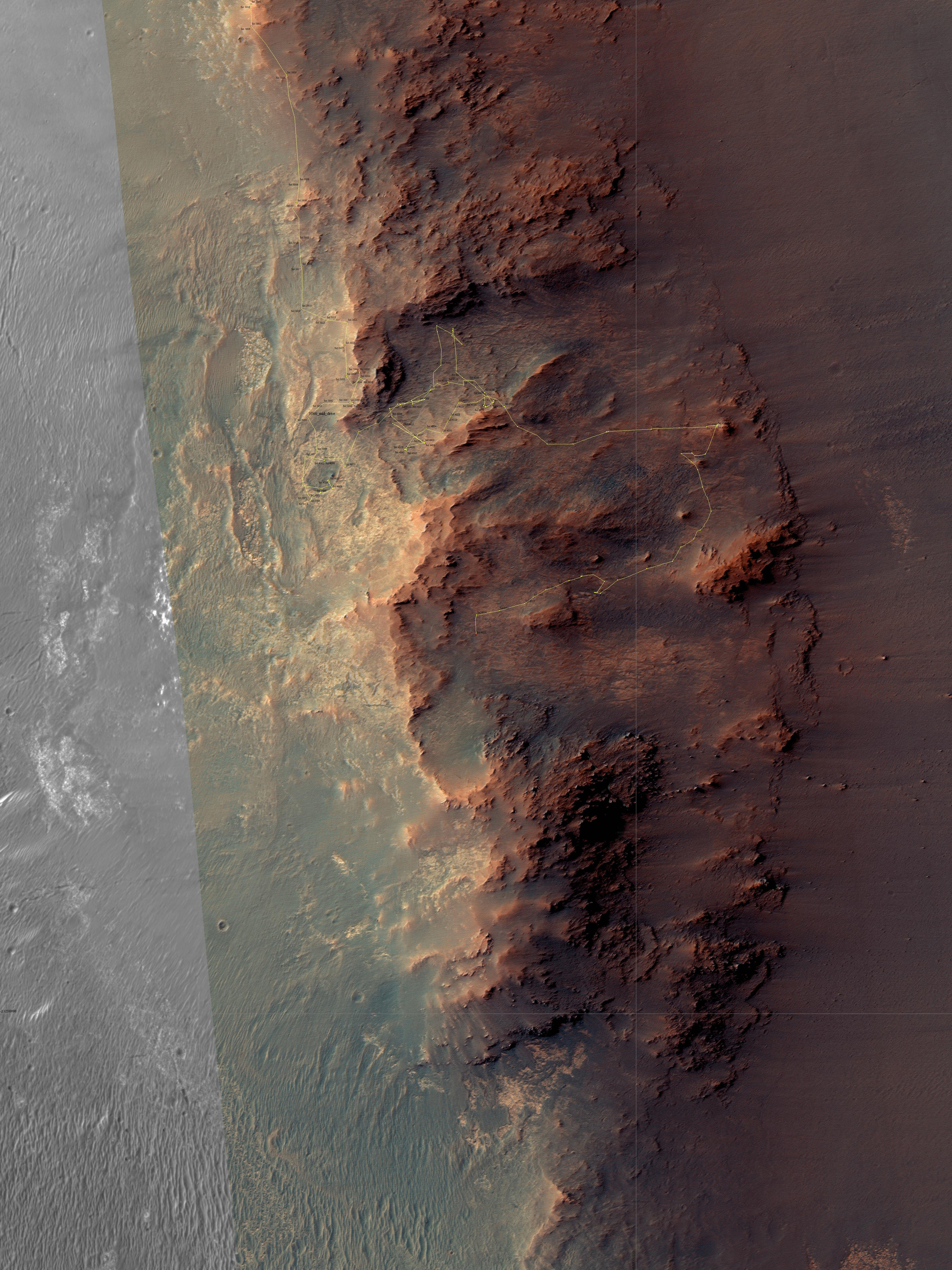
Traverse map to January 27, 2017 (Sol 4625)

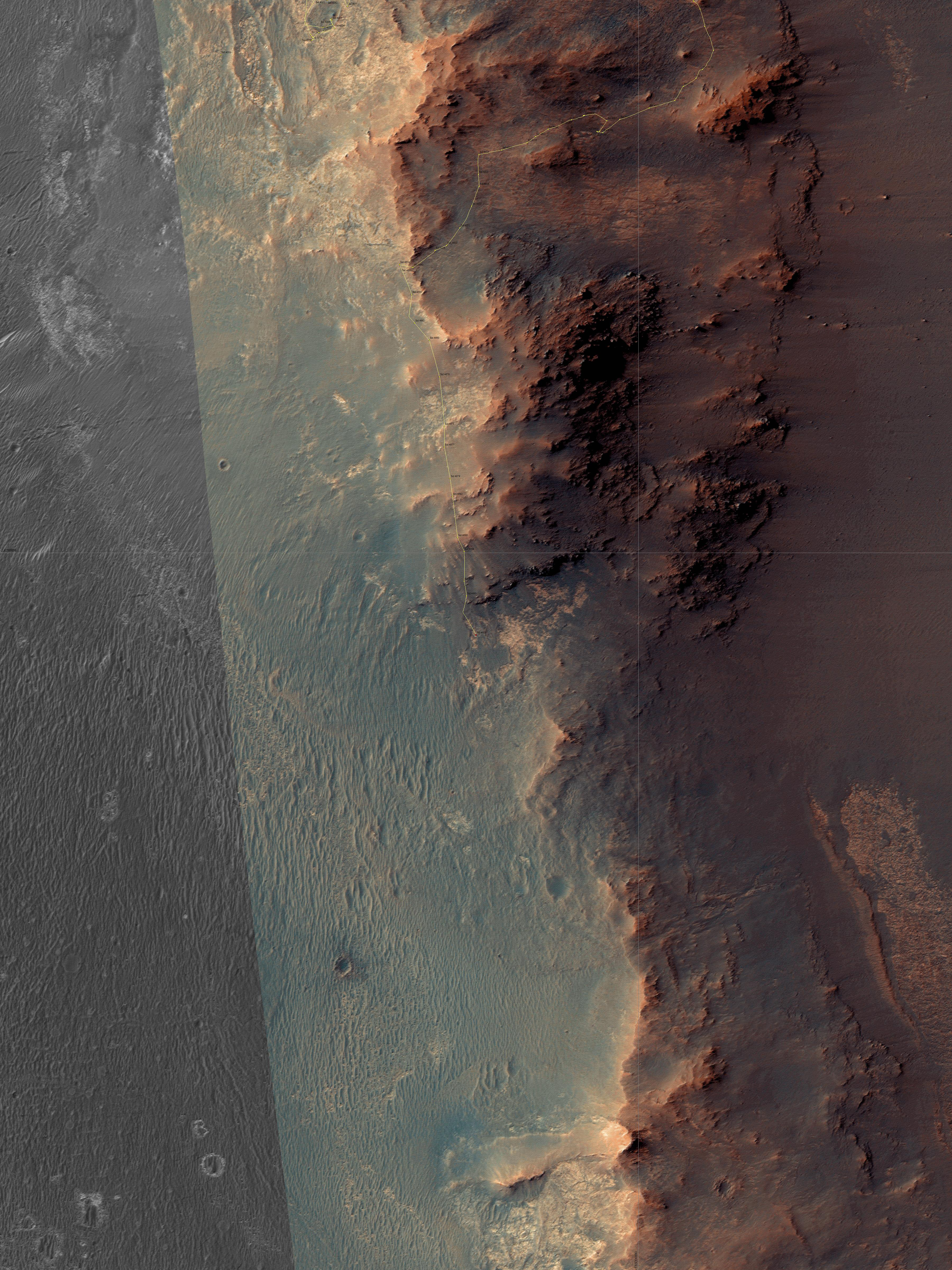
Traverse map to April 11, 2017 (Sol 4695)

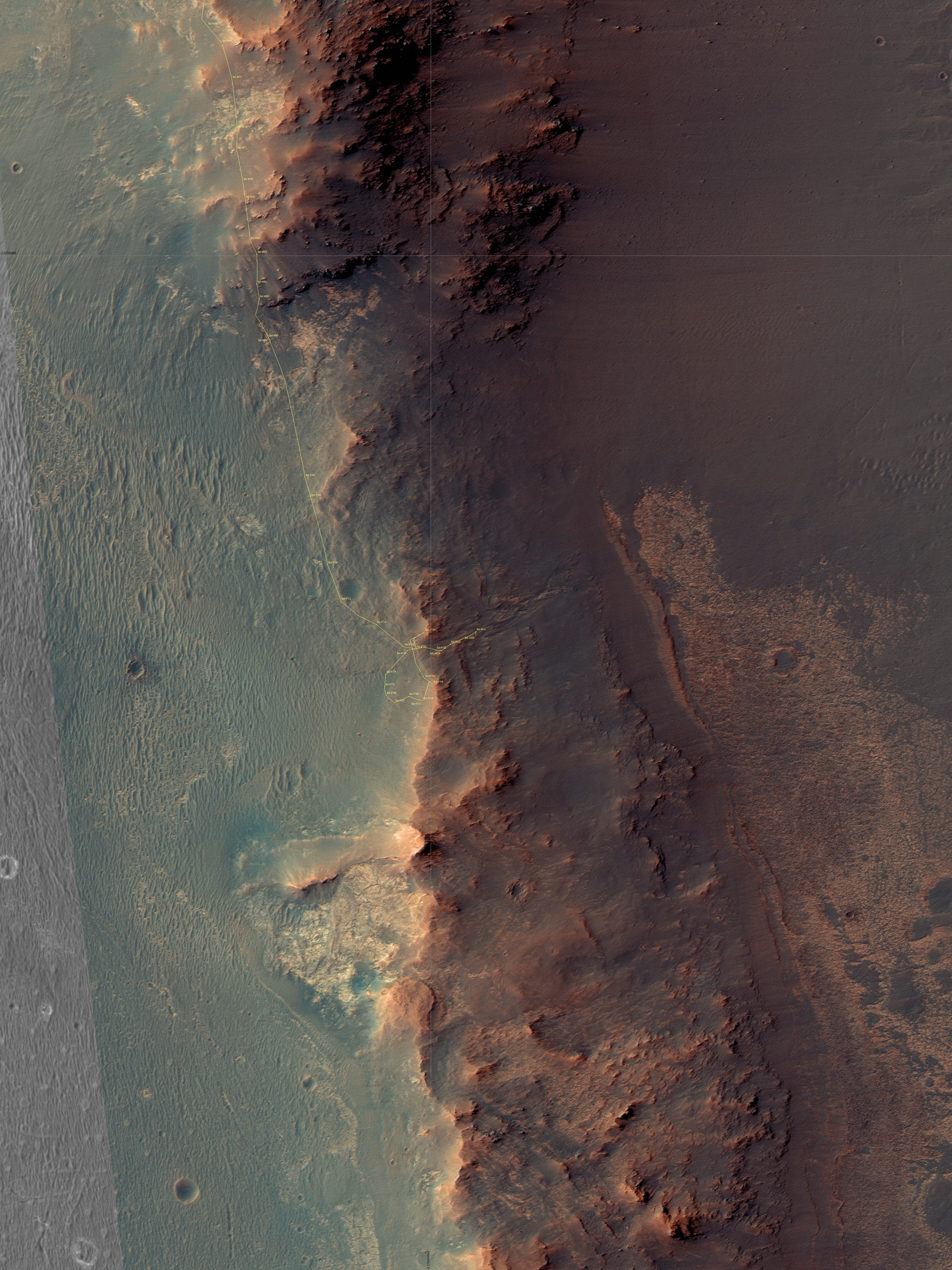
Traverse map to September 12, 2017 (Sol 4836)

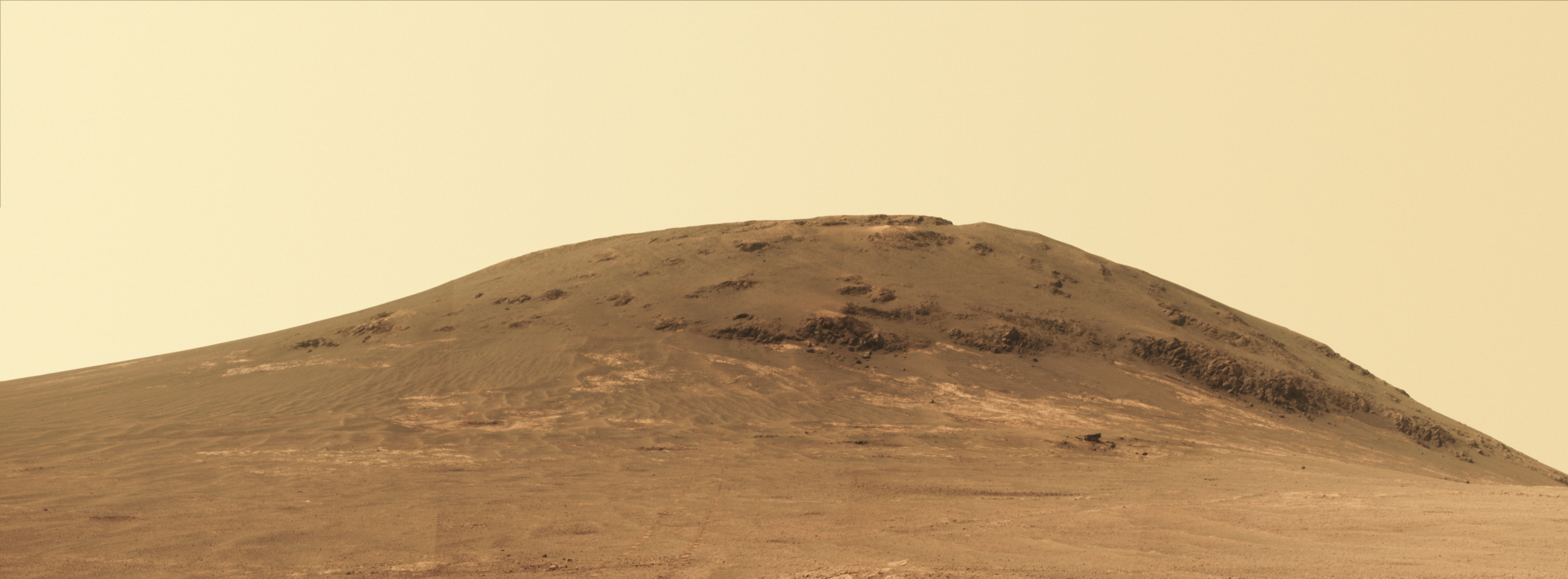
Opportunity looks north as it departs Cape Tribulation, its southern end shown here (April 2017)

==== Up to 4836 (September 2017) ====
Rover arrives at the Gully (Perseverance Valley) and heads into it, taking measurements and pictures, but also had to survive the Mars winter (November Winter Solstice).

=== 2018 ===
In 2018 the rover continued to explore the area called Perseverance Valley, which is on the western rim of Endeavor Crater. The feature was previously called "Gully" and it was named by the rover team in early 2017. The rover reached Perseverance Valley (the gully) in 2017 and spent the rest of the year exploring this area. In 2018 this in-depth study continued.

The Valley may have a previously unknown type of rock. It is thought to be a fluid-carved channel, a spillway from the surrounding planes down to the crater floor. Among the candidates for what carved the channels are water, but also ice or wind currents. One of the ongoing questions is the idea of ancient water on Mars, and how it may have impacted the modern Mars environment. In the 2010s NASA has been on the hunt for ancient fossils left by tiny living organisms especially when they make large colonies, such as Stromatolites, which look like mushroom shaped rocks but are made by colonies of bacteria. The question of ancient bacteria on Mars was raised in the 1990s, when a scientist thought he had found microscopic bacterial fossils on a meteorite that came from Mars (see ALH84001) but was found on Earth. Future missions, such as Mars 2020, will carry more advanced chemical and geological detectors to Mars with them; some images taken by Opportunity have led to speculation about whether the images contain evidence of extraterrestrial life. One example, as reported by National Geographic, appears to show a cauliflower-shaped rock in an image taken by the Spirit rover in 2007, which, to some scientists, resembled fossils of microscopic stromatolites, which are ubiquitous on Earth, and represent the earliest widely accepted example of life in Earth's biosphere. Stromatolites, thought to be signs of some of the earliest life discovered on Earth, almost 4 billion years ago, are on Earth today. Another candidate are cynobacteria which are also determined to be among the oldest life on Earth. Because of the large impacts that eject matter into space Mars has exchanged material with over long time scales, leading some to suggest life could make the journey between Earth and Mars. Indeed, cynobacteria survived for almost two-years in space (Aboard ISS) and could still come alive again when put in life conditions after being in zero-g, zero-air, high radiation conditions common to outer space. On the colonization side, cyanobacteria like nostoc colonies that have been studied for terraforming are known to survive on Mars regolith simulant and lower pressures. Some the evidence for ancient water include the discovery of minerals that form in the presence of water, such as Jarosite, discovered by Opportunity at Eagle Crater in 2004. (see also Martian spherules)

Opportunity studied the rock target Jornada del Muerto in Perseverance Valley, using its surviving suite of instruments including the Microscopic Imager (MI), APXS, and the color cameras. At this time rocks from the Matijevic Formation have not been found, and the valley is proving to have some complicated natures One area being studied is how the dust flows through channel and makes deposits.

On Sol 4977 (Jan. 23, 2018), the stored backup flight software was updated to the latest version. On that day electrical production was 644 watt-hours, and total distance traveled on Mars since landing was 28.02 miles (45.09 kilometers).

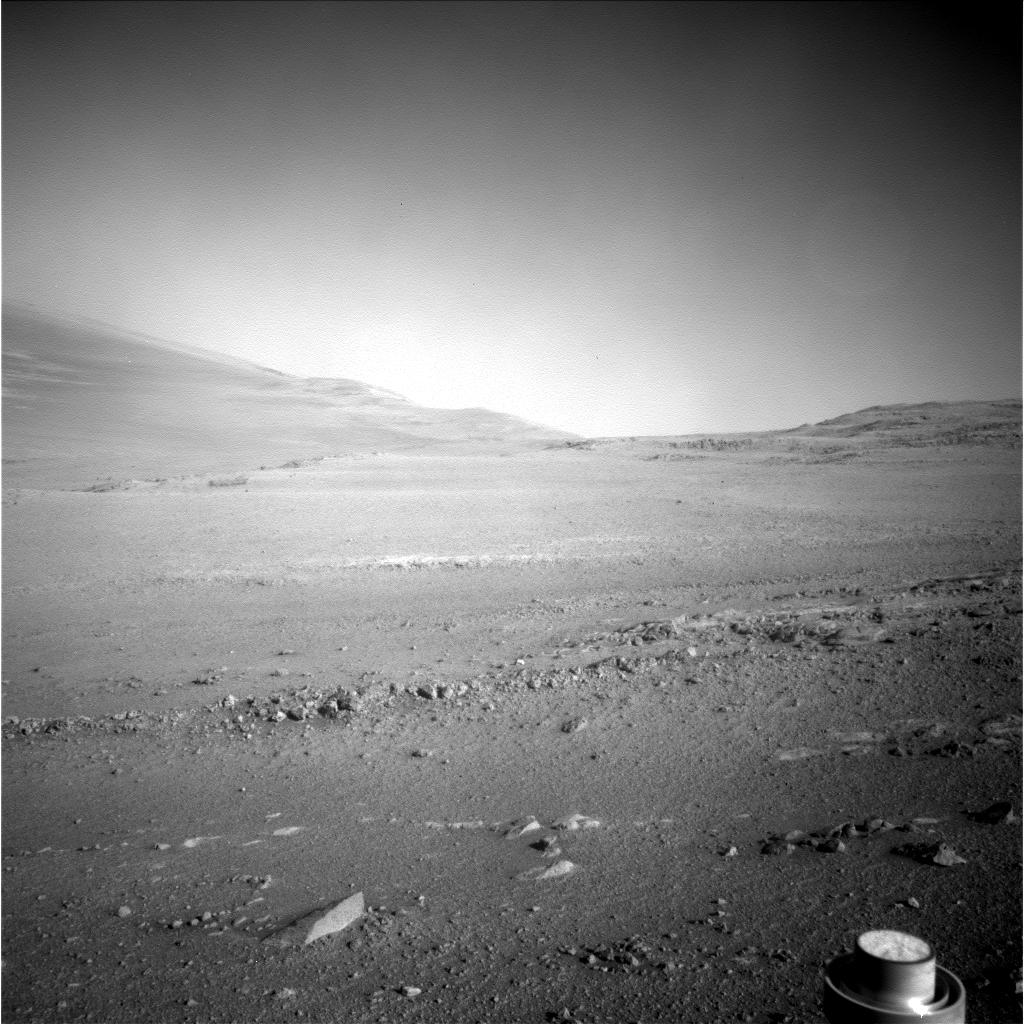
MER-B NavCam image Sol 4959 Start of January 2018, looking along rim of Endeavour crater

On Sol 4999 (Feb. 15, 2018) MER-B took a Pancam of the Martian sunrise.

==== 5000 sols on Mars ====
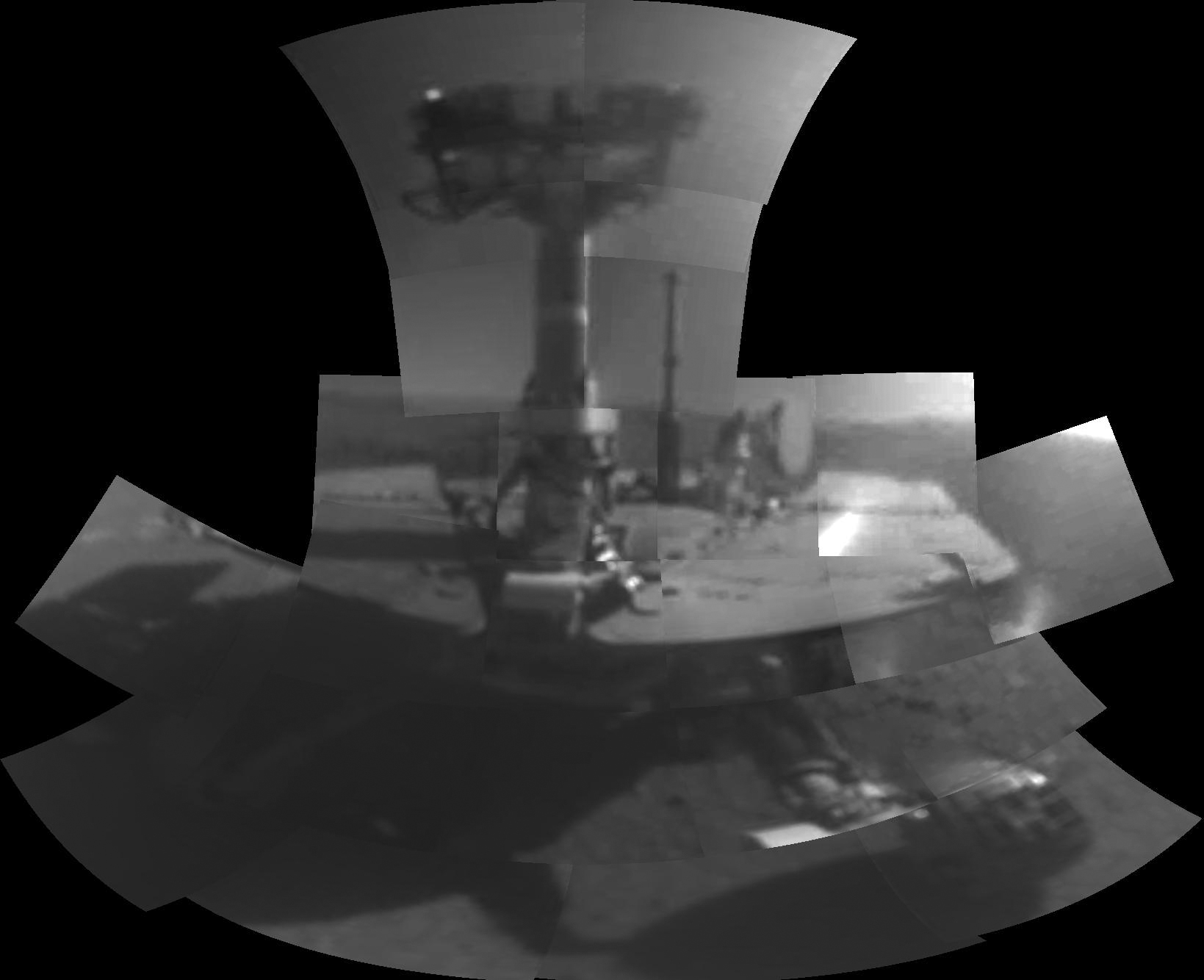
Opportunity's first self-portrait including the camera mast on Mars
(February 14−20, 2018 / sols 4998−5004)

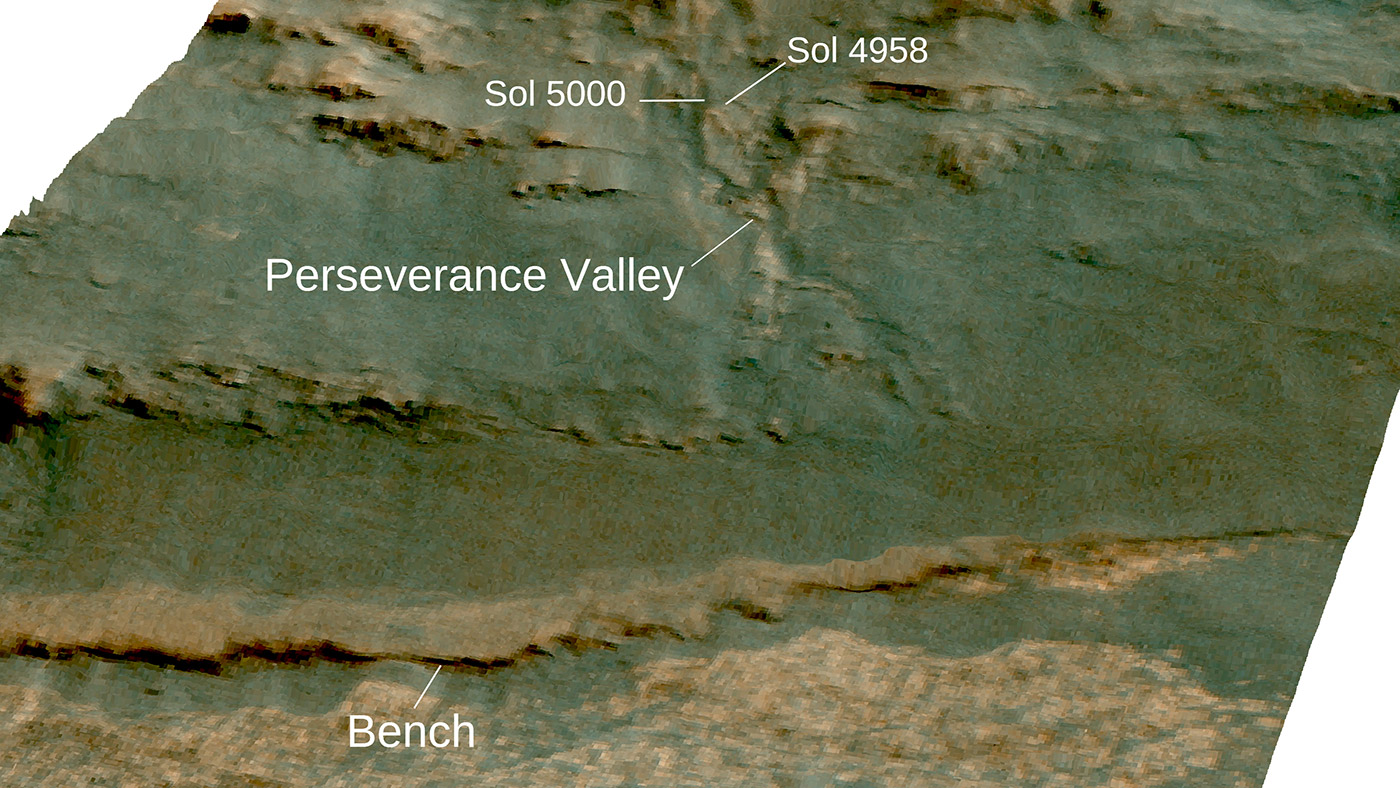
HiRise image from MRO, was laid over 3-D topographic map of the terrain, with 5-fold vertical exaggeration; view looking west on to Perseverance Valley on the western rim of Endeavour crater (February 15, 2018)

On February 16, 2018, MER-B achieved 5000 sols (Martian Days) on Mars since landing on the planet in January 2004. At the time it was making its way down Perseverance Valley (aka the Gully) on the western rim of Endeavour crater, which it has been exploring in since 2011. The interior rim of the crater where Opportunity is exploring is sloped at about 15 to 20 degrees on average.

===== Sol 5,000 (Feb. 16, 2018) =====
On Sol 5000 the team used the rover to take a self-portrait including the Pancam mast, by using the microscopic imager on the end of the robotic arm.

Power production on Sol 5004 (Feb. 20, 2018) was 653 watt-hours.

==== Dust storm ====
Mars (before/after) dust storm (July 2018)

This animation of Mars shows a growing dust storm from May 31 to June 11, 2018. The images were taken by the Mars Color Imager (MARCI) camera on the Mars Reconnaissance Orbiter (MRO). Locations of Opportunity and Curiosity are noted.

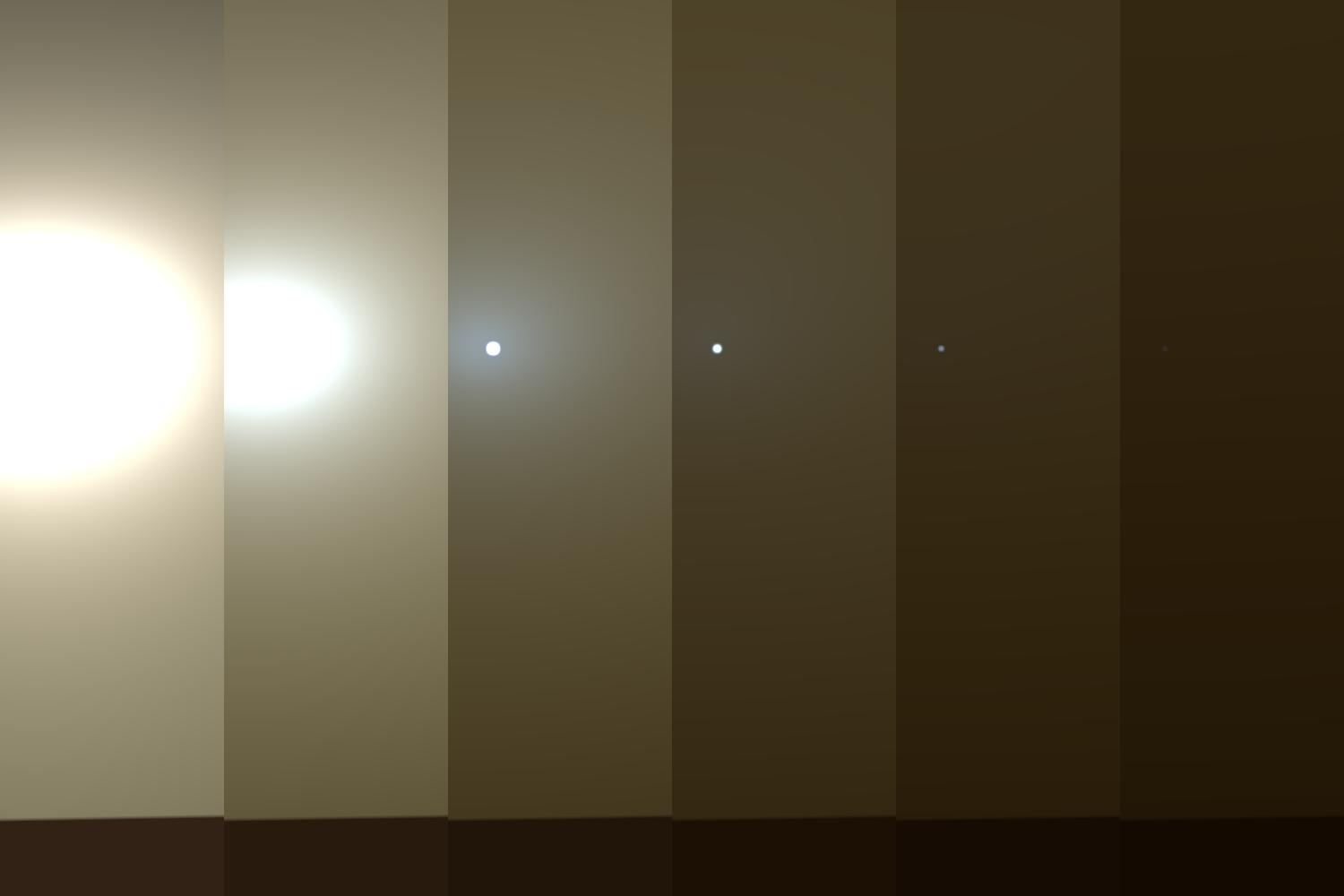
Mars Opportunity rover – diminishing visibility (simulated) due to dust storm (June 2018).

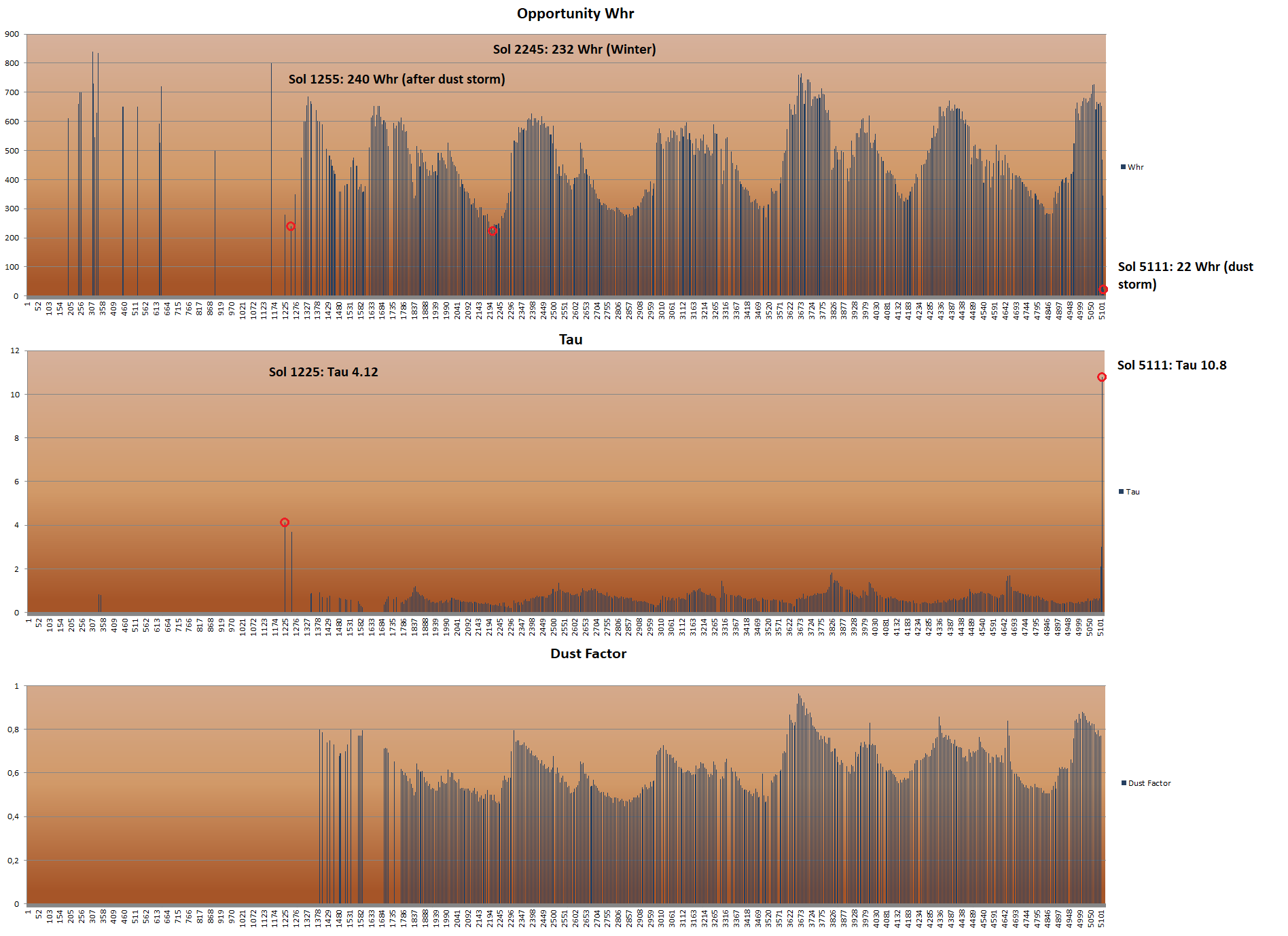
Values of the energy production (in Watthours), tau (atmosphere opacity) and the dust factor for the rover Opportunity since landing in 2004.

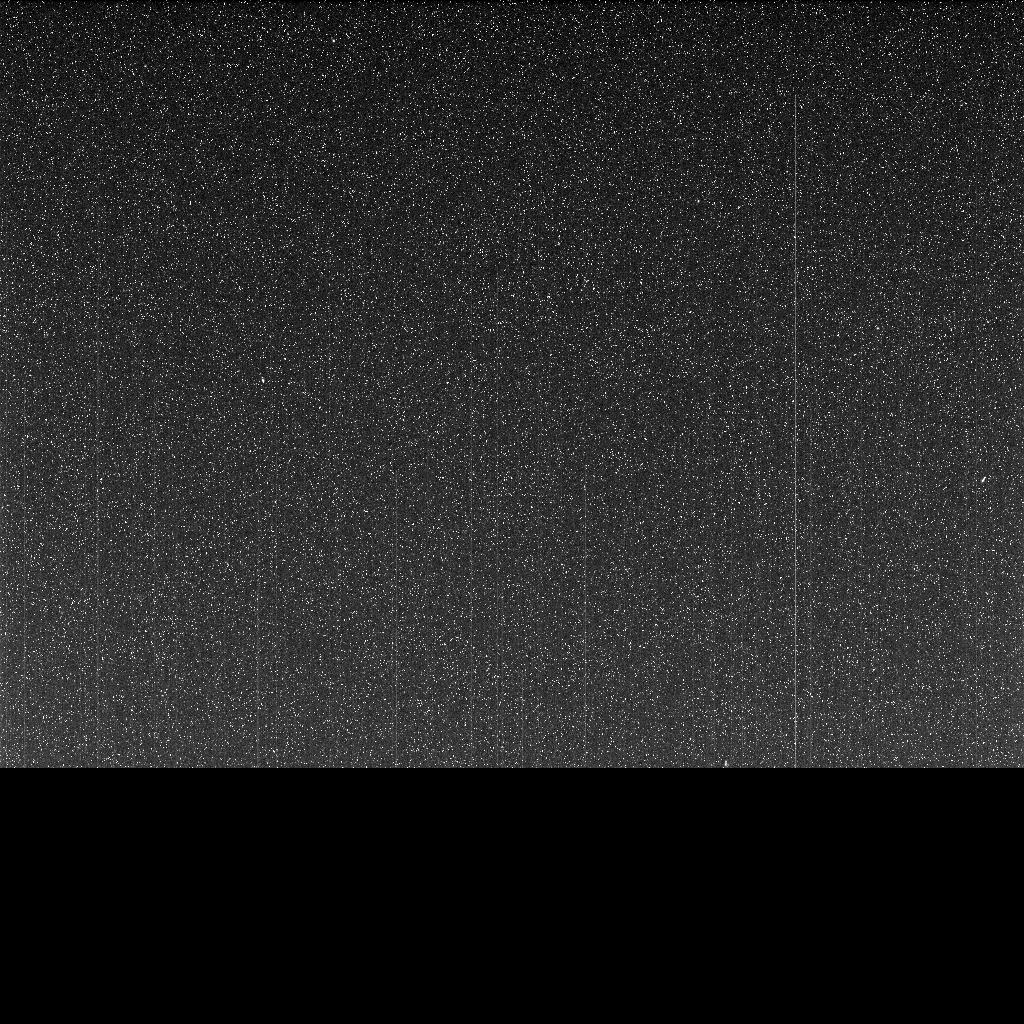
Opportunity rover ‒ last image (of 228,771 images; 10 June 2018)

In June 2018, a local dust storm began to develop near Opportunity. The first signs of the 1,000 km (620 mi) distant storm were discovered on June 1, 2018, in photographs by the Mars Color Imager (MARCI) camera on the Mars Reconnaissance Orbiter (MRO). More weather reports from the MRO and the MARCI team indicated a prolonged storm. Although this was, at that time, still far away from the rover, it began to influence the atmospheric opacity at the rover's location.

Within days, the storm had spread globally. As a result, plans were developed on June 4 and 5 to prepare for the anticipated lower power supply. Since then, the atmosphere over the rover had worsened further. On June 3, the 5105th Sol, Opportunity's solar panels still generated 468 watt-hours. The atmospheric opacity (called tau value) was about 1.0.

The power supply dropped to 345 watt hours on June 4 at a tau of 2.1. On June 6, only 133 watt hours were generated, the tau value was estimated at 3.0. Opportunity has not experienced such high tau levels since the last dust storm in 2007, which had an estimated tau value of 5.5. The 2018 storm had an estimated tau value of 10.8 on June 10 and the storm spanned an area of 41 million km^{2} (16 million sq mi) - the approximate area of both North America and Russia combined.

The rover team made another plan, in which the rover gets only the latest commands at the first sol in the morning and sleeps until the next morning. The rover then wakes up in the afternoon to conduct atmospheric measurements with the Pancam and conduct a brief communication session with the MRO orbiter. However, scientific investigations were discontinued, and the rover entered continuous hibernation on June 12. Although Opportunity rover requires the power generated by solar panels to keep the central electrical components warm, it features a small radioisotope heater unit (RPU) that does not require sunlight to function, and the relatively warm summer weather was not expected to damage the electronic components at night.

Although such dust storms are not surprising, they rarely occur. They can arise within a short time and then persist for weeks to months. During the southern season of summer, the sunlight heats dust particles and brings them higher into the atmosphere. This creates wind, which in turn stirs up more dust. This results in a feedback loop that scientists are still trying to understand, so they are taking an opportunity to study this storm from orbit using the various visible and infrared instruments on the MRO orbiter.

As of June 10, 2018 the mission for Opportunity was able to extend its 92-day (Earth) mission to over 5250 days. Opportunity took its last image (of an overall total of 228,771 raw images) on June 10, 2018.

On June 12, 2018, Opportunity entered safe mode as evidenced by its lack of communication. A NASA teleconference about the dust storm was presented on June 13, 2018. Opportunity's team implemented additional communication times from NASA's Deep Space Network to receive up-to-date data from Mars. The data obtained showed that the temperature of the rover had fallen to −29 °C (−20 °F). An advantage of the dust storm is that the temperature differences are not as extreme as they are on the surface of Mars. In addition, the swirled-up dust absorbs heat, thereby increasing the ambient temperature at the location of Opportunity. NASA reported on June 20, 2018, that the dust storm had grown to completely cover the entire planet.

NASA stated they did not expect to resume communication until after the global dust storm subsided.

Opportunity solar array energy production during the 2018 dust storm
Date	Watt-hours
Sol 5079 (May 8, 2018)	667
Sol 5100 (May 29, 2018)	652
Sol 5105 (June 3, 2018)	468
Sol 5106 (June 4, 2018)	345
Sol 5107 (June 6, 2018)	133
Sol 5111 (June 10, 2018)	22

==== After the storm ====
At the beginning of September 2018, the atmospheric opacity (tau) over the rover site was estimated to be below 1.5. This started a 45-day window that was expected to be the best time to re-establish contact with the rover. After more than three months without contact, NASA expected Opportunity to have most of its timers in fault state. To take this into account, as of September 19, 2018, "sweep and beep" commands are sent throughout the available transmission time.

By early October, the storm subsided and the atmosphere cleared up, but the rover kept silent, suggesting either a catastrophic failure or a layer of dust covered its solar panels. By November 27, 2018, NASA had attempted to contact Opportunity 359 times. The team remained hopeful that a windy period between November 2018 and January 2019 would clear the dust from its solar panels, as had happened before.

=== 2019 ===
On February 12, 2019, NASA announced it made its final attempt to contact the rover before declaring the rover dead.

== Sol milestones ==
- Sol 3,000 (July 2, 2012)
- Sol 4,000 (April 26, 2015)
- Sol 5,000 (February 16, 2018)
- Sol 5,111 (June 10, 2018) – Contact lost.
- Sol 5,352 (Feb 12, 2019) – Mission officially declared complete.

== Solar array energy production ==
Mars dust storm – optical depth tau – May to September 2018 (Mars Climate Sounder; Mars Reconnaissance Orbiter) (1:38; animation; October 30, 2018; file description

Opportunity solar array energy production per sol (2018 dust storm)
Date	Watt-hours
Sol 5079 (May 8, 2018)	667
Sol 5100 (May 29, 2018)	652
Sol 5105 (June 3, 2018)	468
Sol 5106 (June 4, 2018)	345
Sol 5107 (June 6, 2018)	133
Sol 5111 (June 10, 2018)	22

=== Examples ===
Examples of watt-hours per sol collected by the rover:

Solar array energy production throughout mission graphs

Opportunity solar array energy production (2013–2014)
Date	Watt-hours
Sol 3376 (July 23, 2013)	431
Sol 3384 (July 31, 2013)	395
Sol 3390 (August 6, 2013)	385
Sol 3430 (September 16, 2013)	346
Sol 3452 (October 9, 2013)	325
Sol 3472 (October 30, 2013)	299
Sol 3478 (November 5, 2013)	311
Sol 3494 (November 21, 2013)	302
Sol 3507 (December 5, 2013)	270
Sol 3534 (January 1, 2014)	371
Sol 3602 (March 12, 2014)	498
Sol 3606 (March 16, 2014)	615
Sol 3621 (April 1, 2014)	661
Sol 3676 (May 27, 2014)	764
Sol 3710 (July 1, 2014)	745
Sol 3744 (August 5, 2014)	686
Sol 3771 (September 2, 2014)	713
Sol 3805 (October 7, 2014)	640
Sol 3834 (November 6, 2014)	505
Sol 3859 (December 1, 2014)	468

Opportunity solar array energy production (2015–2016)
Date	Watt-hours
Sol 3894 (January 6, 2015)	438
Sol 3921 (February 3, 2015)	484
Sol 3948 (March 3, 2015)	545
Sol 3982 (April 7, 2015)	559
Sol 4010 (May 5, 2015)	508
Sol 4055 (June 21, 2015)	477
Sol 4084 (July 20, 2015)	432
Sol 4119 (August 25, 2015)	404
Sol 4153 (September 29, 2015)	352
Sol 4180 (October 27, 2015)	332
Sol 4201 (November 18, 2015)	376
Sol 4221 (December 8, 2015)	407
Sol 4246 (January 3, 2016)	449
Sol 4275 (February 2, 2016)	498
Sol 4303 (March 1, 2016)	585
Sol 4337 (April 5, 2016)	650
Sol 4377 (May. 16, 2016)	672
Sol 4398 (June 7, 2016)	637
Sol 4425 (July 5, 2016)	644
Sol 4457 (August 7, 2016)	607
Sol 4486 (September 5, 2016)	476
Sol 4514 (October 4, 2016)	472
Sol 4541 (November 1, 2016)	390
Sol 4575 (December 6, 2016)	372

Opportunity solar array energy production (2017–2018)
Date	Watt-hours
Sol 4602 (January 3, 2017)	520
Sol 4636 (February 7, 2017)	414
Sol 4663 (March 6, 2017)	441
Sol 4691 (April 4, 2017)	415
Sol 4718 (May. 2, 2017)	405
Sol 4752 (June 6, 2017)	362
Sol 4786 (July 11, 2017)	352
Sol 4814 (August 8, 2017)	319
Sol 4841 (September 5, 2017)	285
Sol 4875 (October 10, 2017)	339
Sol 4909 (November 14, 2017)	393
Sol 4934 (December 10, 2017)	408
Sol 4970 (January 16, 2018)	525
Sol 4991 (February 8, 2018)	628
Sol 5025 (March 13, 2018)	679
Sol 5052 (April 10, 2018)	694
Sol 5079 (May 8, 2018)	667
Sol 5100 (May 29, 2018)	652
Sol 5105 (June 3, 2018)	468
Sol 5106 (June 4, 2018)	345
Sol 5107 (June 6, 2018)	133
Sol 5111 (June 10, 2018)	22

== Craters, rocks, etc. ==
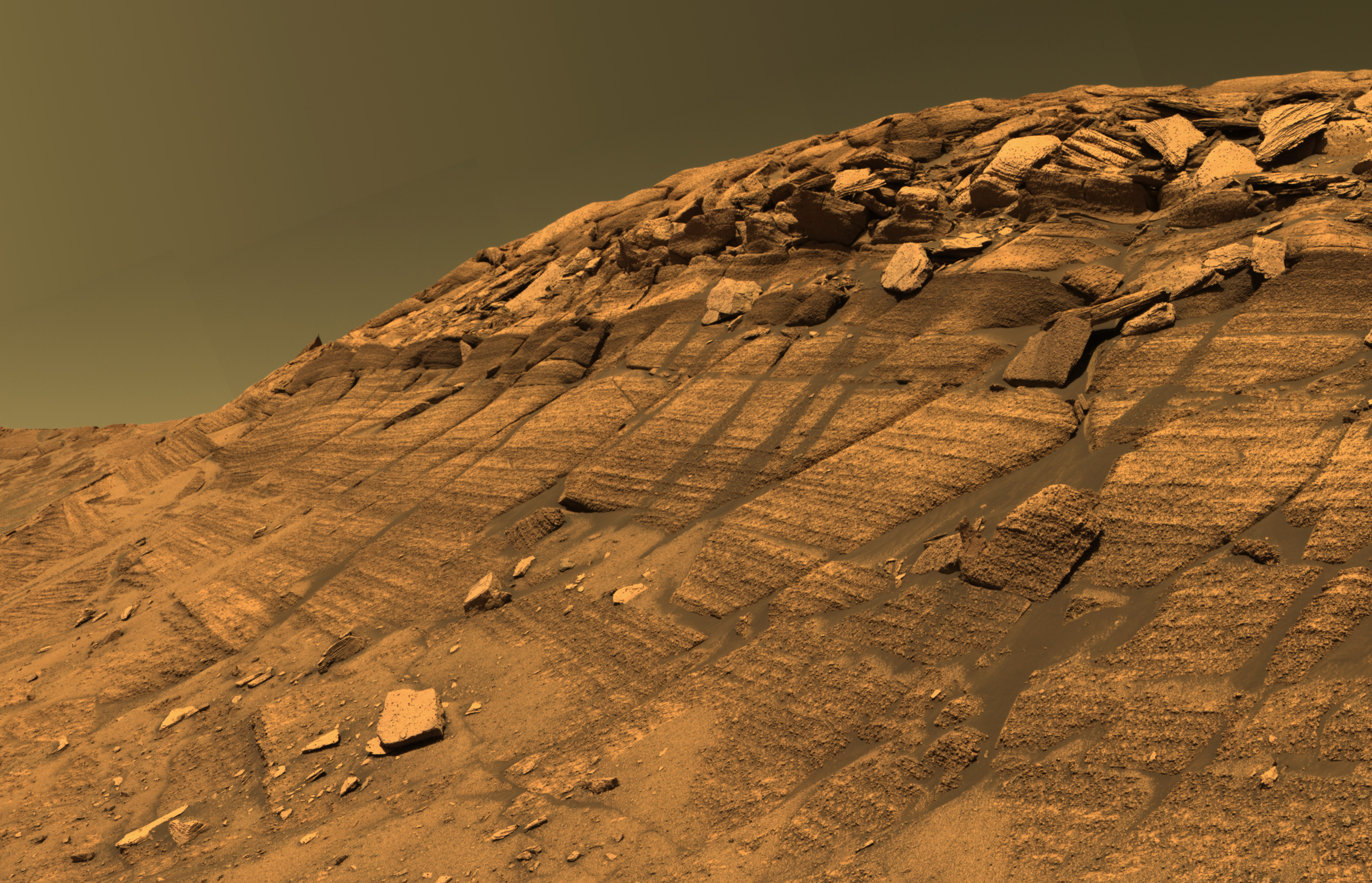
Burns cliff in Endurance crater

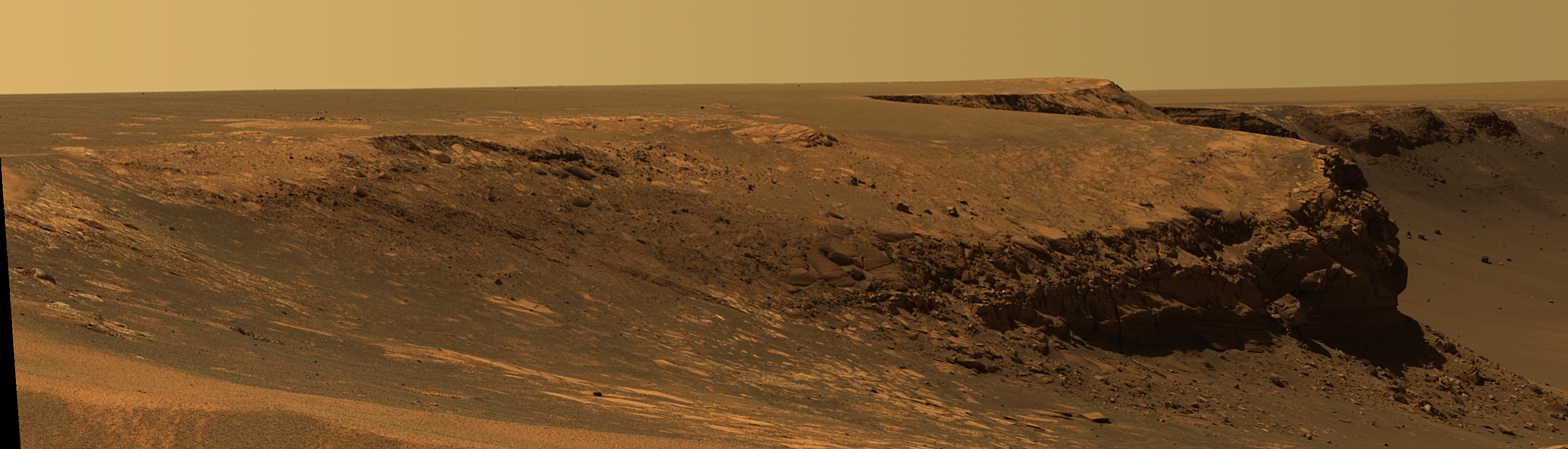
Victoria Crater's Cape Verde

Some of the craters MER-B has investigated

- Eagle crater, visited 2004, 72 feet (22 meters) across (diameter)
- Endurance crater, 2004, 130 meters (430 feet) across
  - Burn's Cliff
- Victoria crater, 2006–9, 800 meters (half a mile) across.
  - Cape Verde
- Endeavour crater, since 2011, 22 km (14 mi)
  - Cape York
  - Solander Point, 2013
  - Cape Tribulation
    - Marathon Valley, 2015-2016
  - Perseverance Valley (aka the Gully), 2017-2018

=== Rocks ===
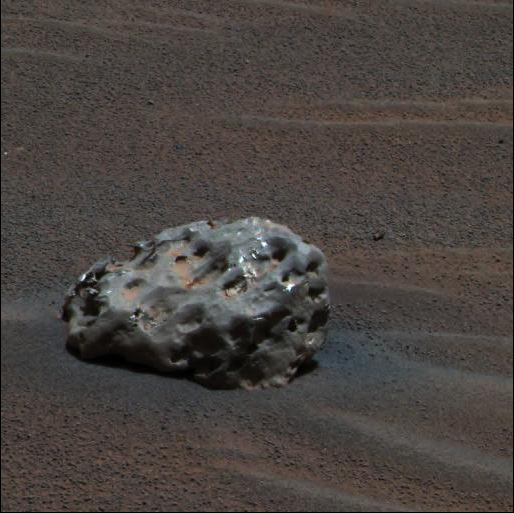
The first meteorite found on another planet, the Meridiani Planum Meteorite (aka Heat Shield Rock)

Some excitement from finding meteorites, new types of rock or signatures detected from orbit, and speculations on ancient alien fossils which as of yet lean towards geological processes.

Examples

- Block Island
- Bounce Rock
- El Capitan
- Heat Shield Rock (formally the Meridiani Planum meteorite)
- Last Chance
- Mackinac Island
- Oileán Ruaidh
- Shelter Island
- Jelly Doughnut (aka Pinnacle Island)

Some other famous targets are the "blueberries" (2004) and "newberries", aka Kirkwood spheres (2012)

See also List of rocks on Mars#Opportunity and List of surface features of Mars imaged by Opportunity

== Images ==
The rover could take pictures with its different cameras, but only the PanCam camera had the ability to photograph a scene with different color filters. The panorama views are usually built up from PanCam images. By February 3, 2018, Opportunity had returned 224,642 pictures.

=== Views ===
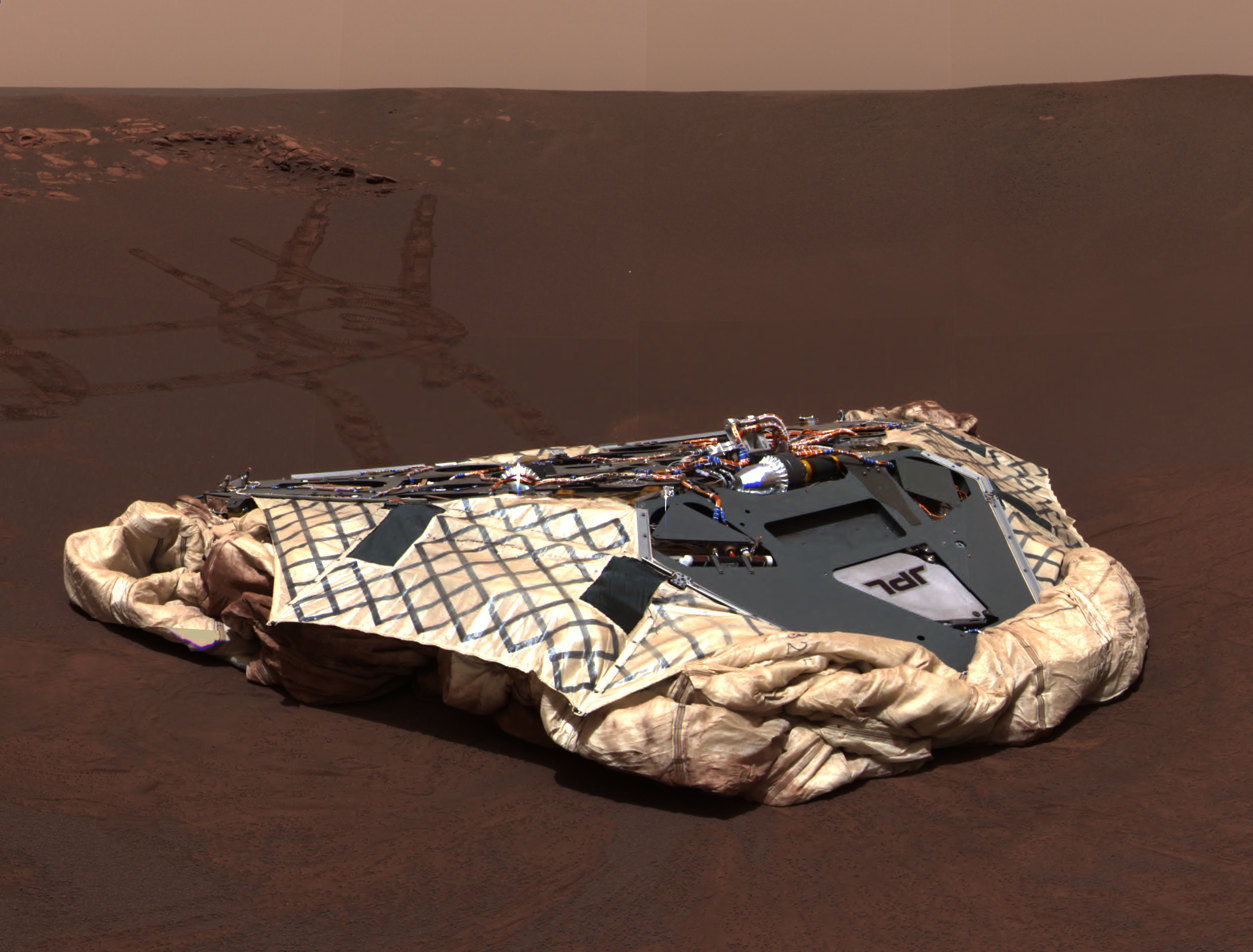
Opportunity images the empty lander, the Challenger Memorial Station

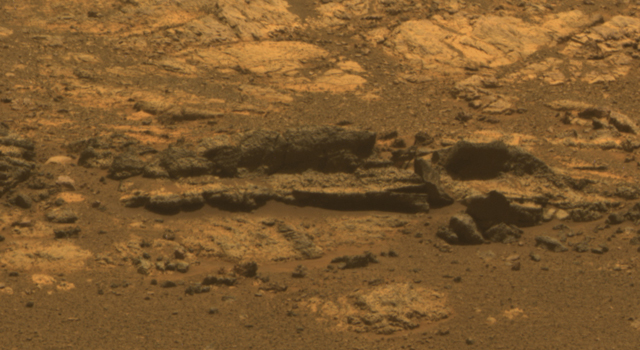
Pancam view from August 2012 (Sol 3058)

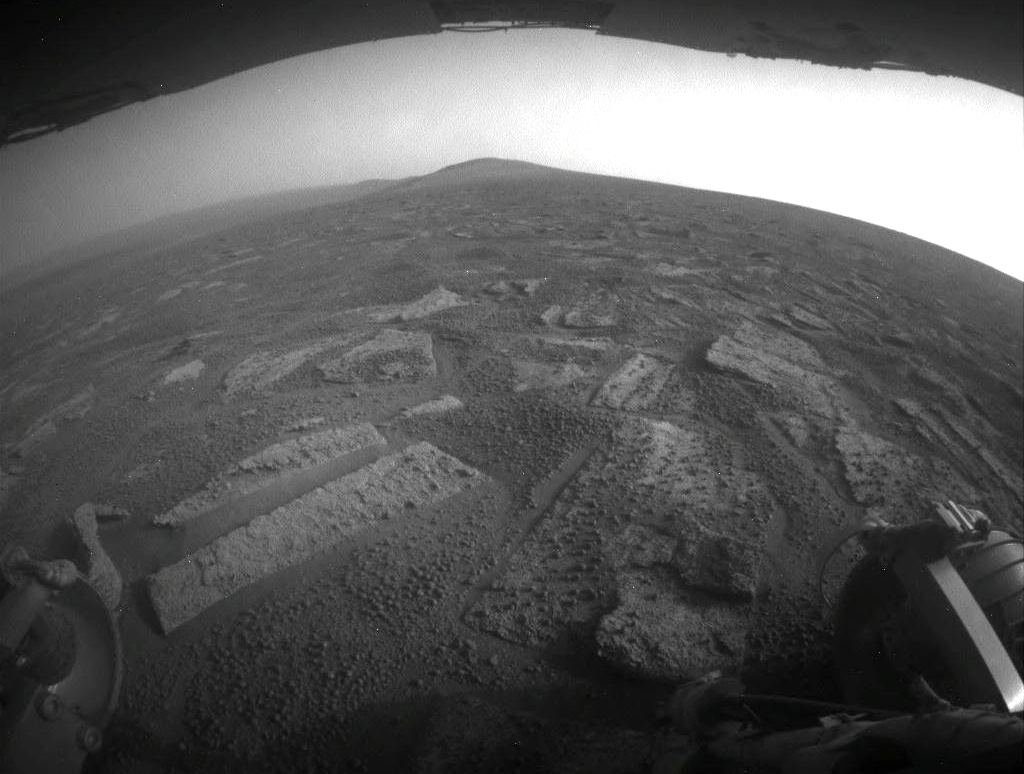
Solander Point is visible on the horizon; foreground shows Botany Bay

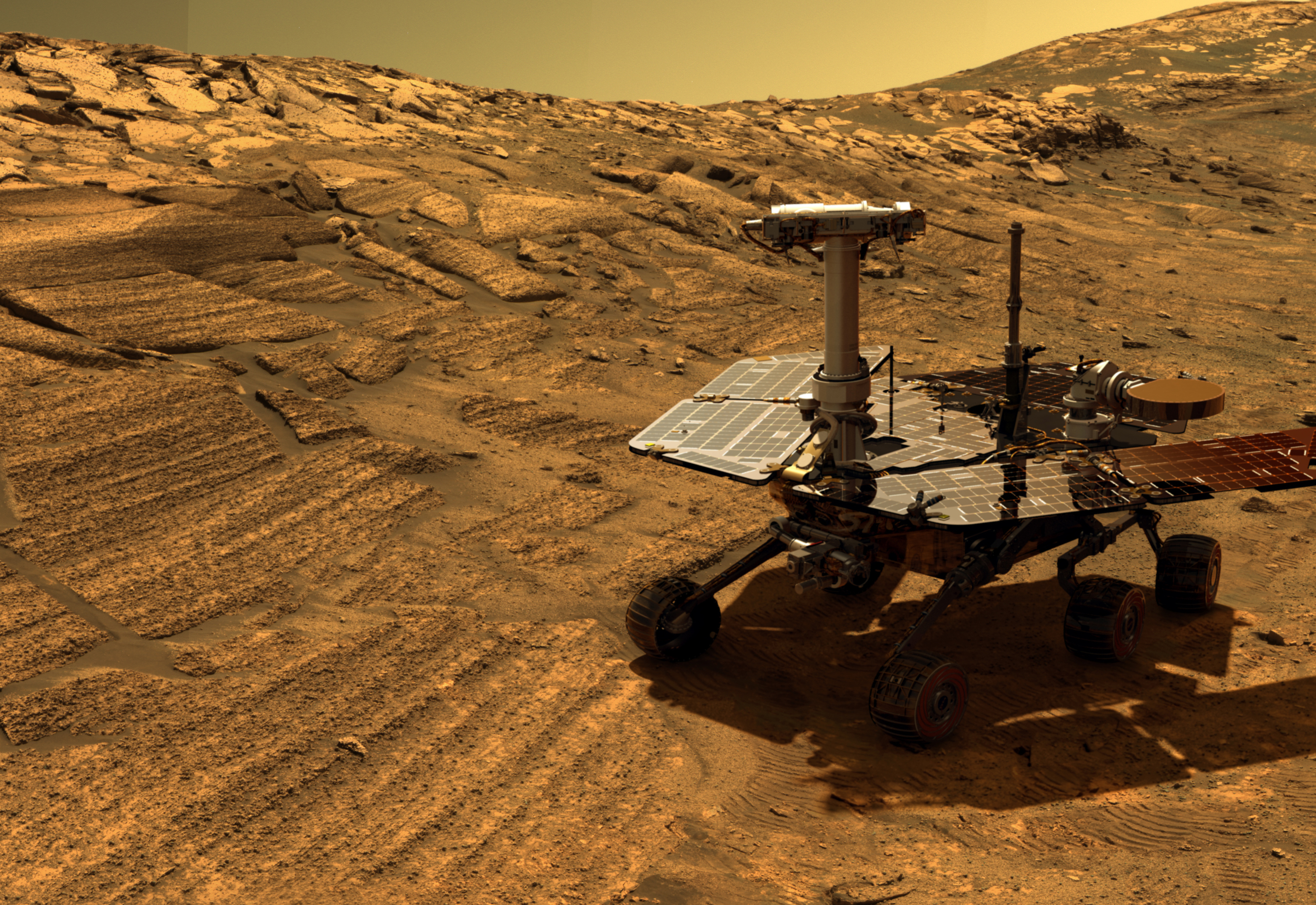
Opportunity in Endurance crater (simulated view based on actual imagery)

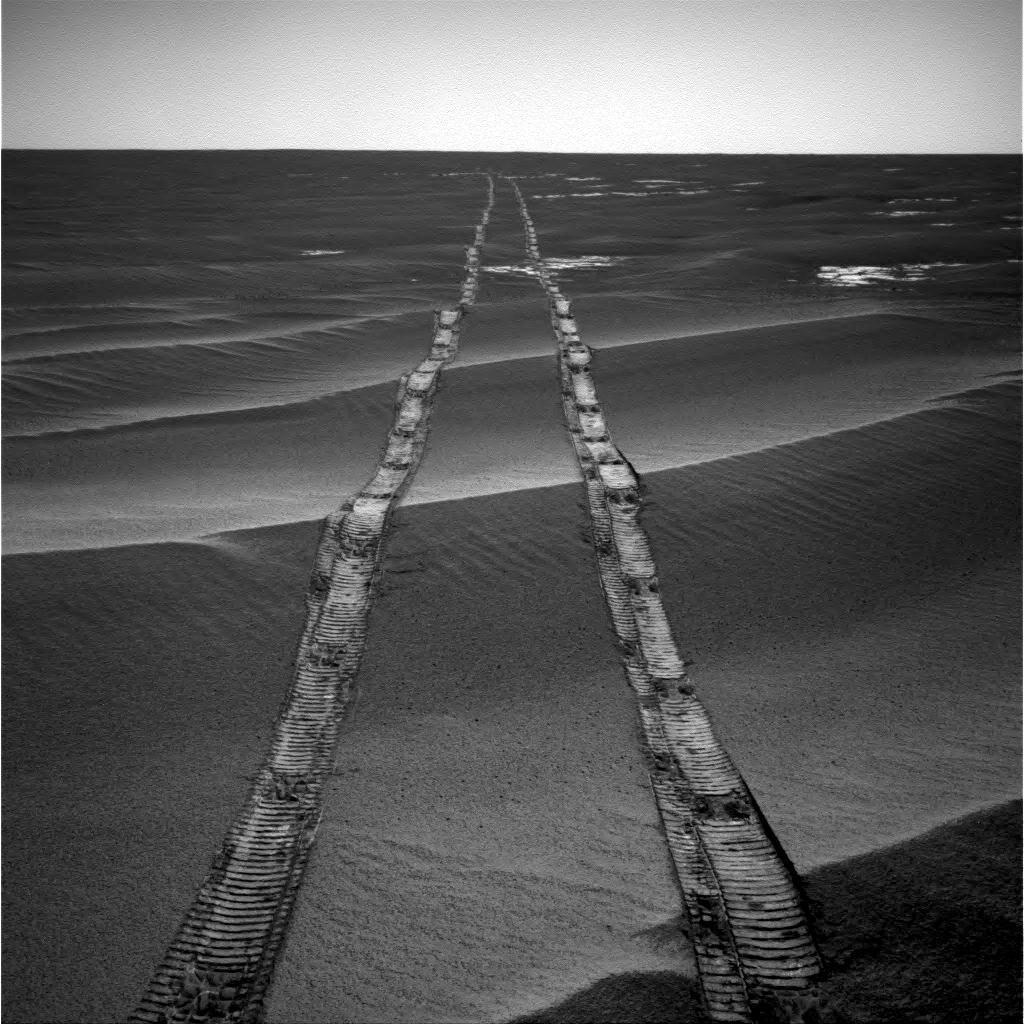
BackTrack view (August 2010)

=== Panoramas ===
A selection of panoramas from the mission:

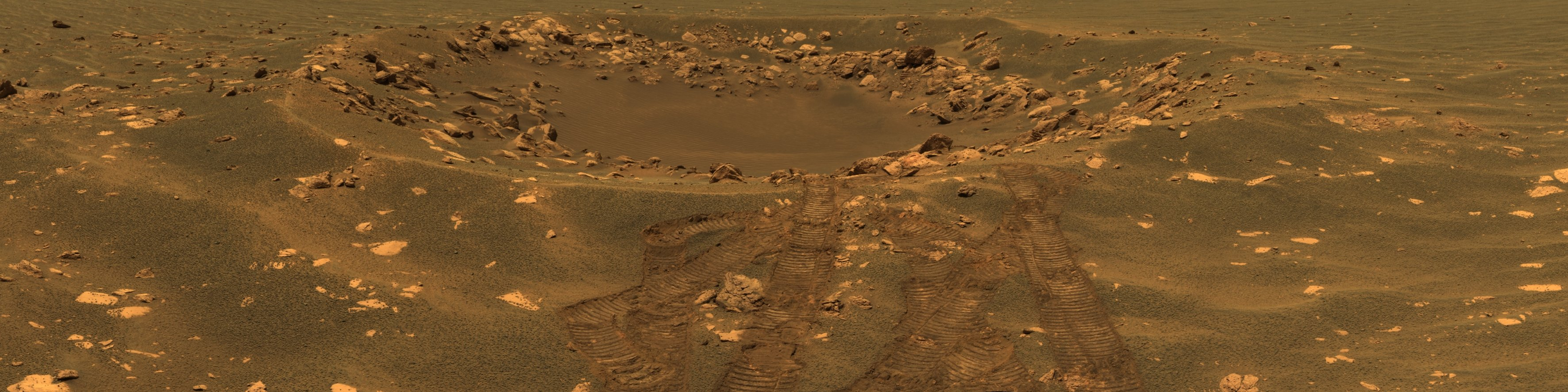
Panorama of Fram crater (Sol 88, April 23, 2004)
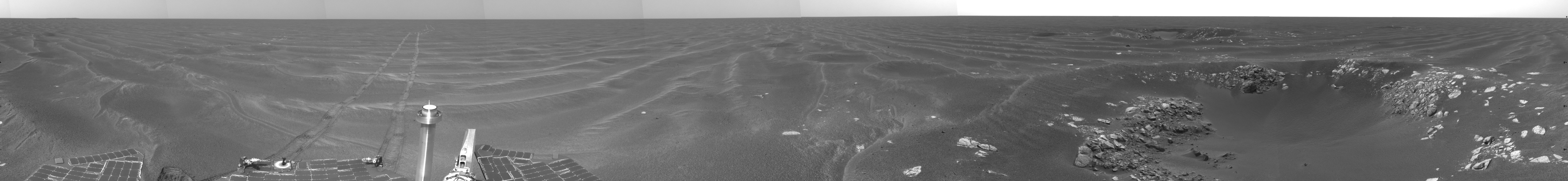
Panorama of Naturaliste crater, in foreground (March 1, 2005)
Panorama taken on the rim of Erebus crater. The rover's solar panels are seen on the lower half (December 5, 2005).
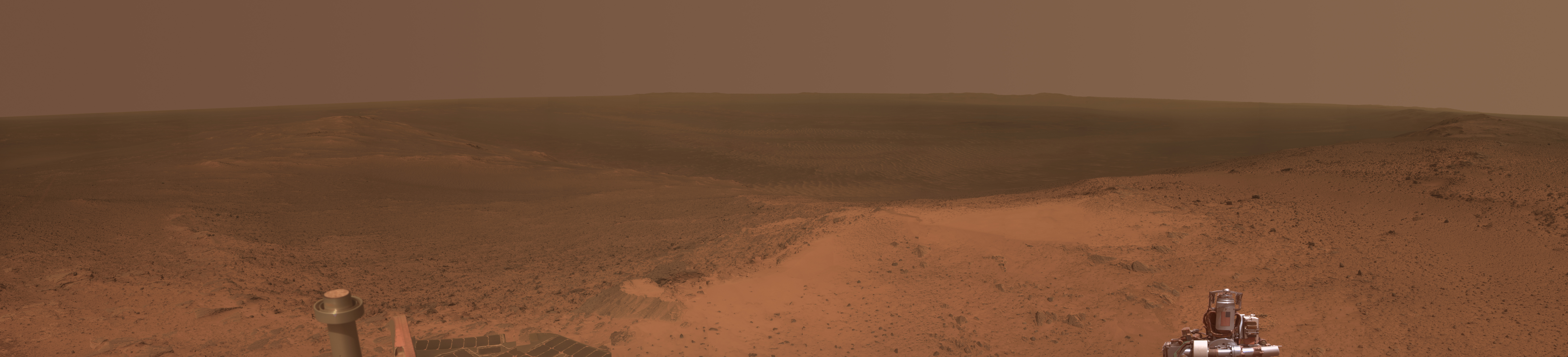
Panorama of the rim of Endeavour crater from Cape Tribulation (January 22, 2015)
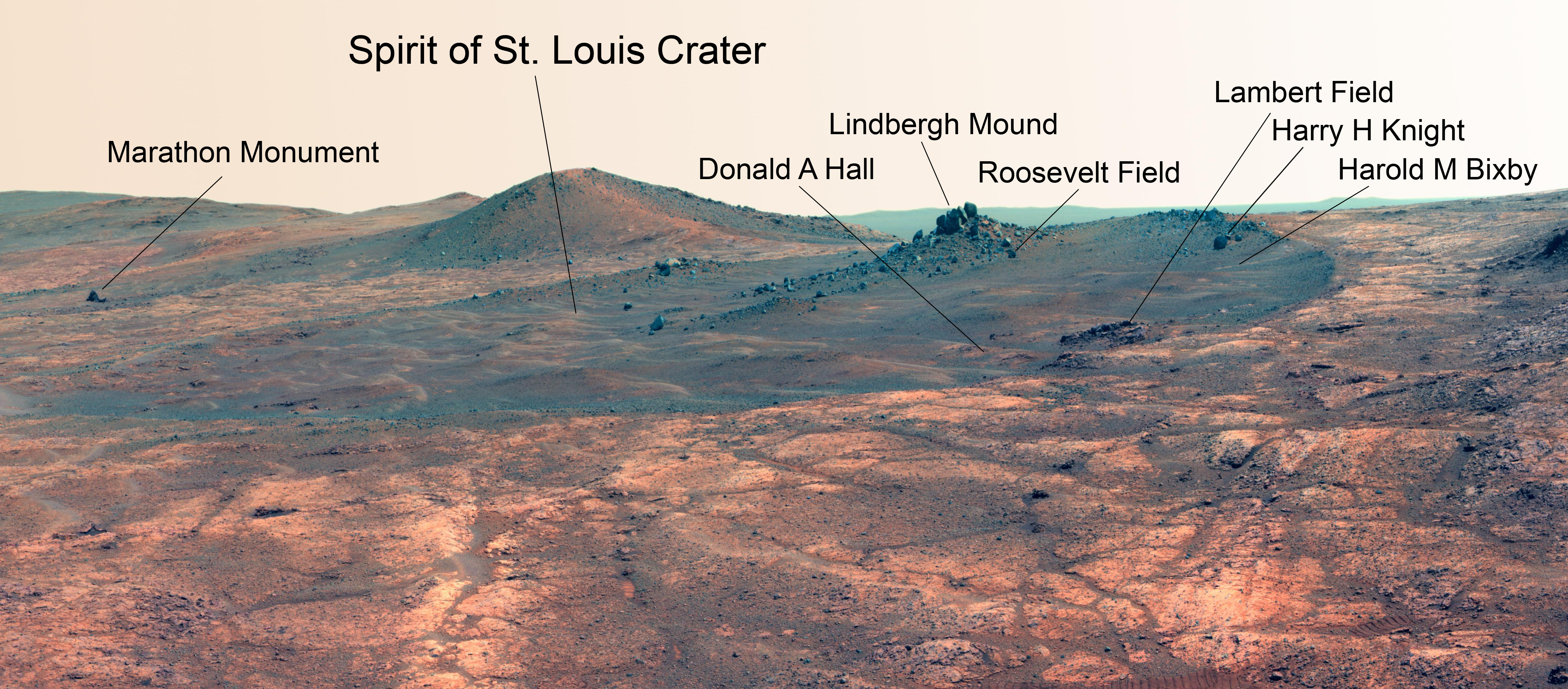
Panorama of Spirit of St. Louis crater, a shallow crater about 34 meters (110 ft) long and 24 meters (80 ft) across. In its center is Lindbergh Mound, about 2 to 3 meters (6 to 10 ft) high. (annotated; false color; May 2015).
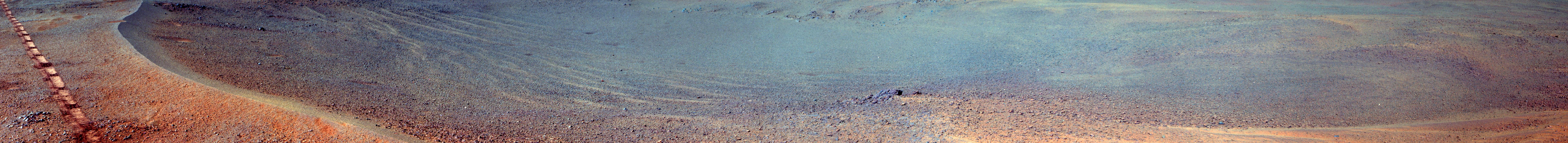
Panorama of Orion crater (enhanced color; April 26, 2017)
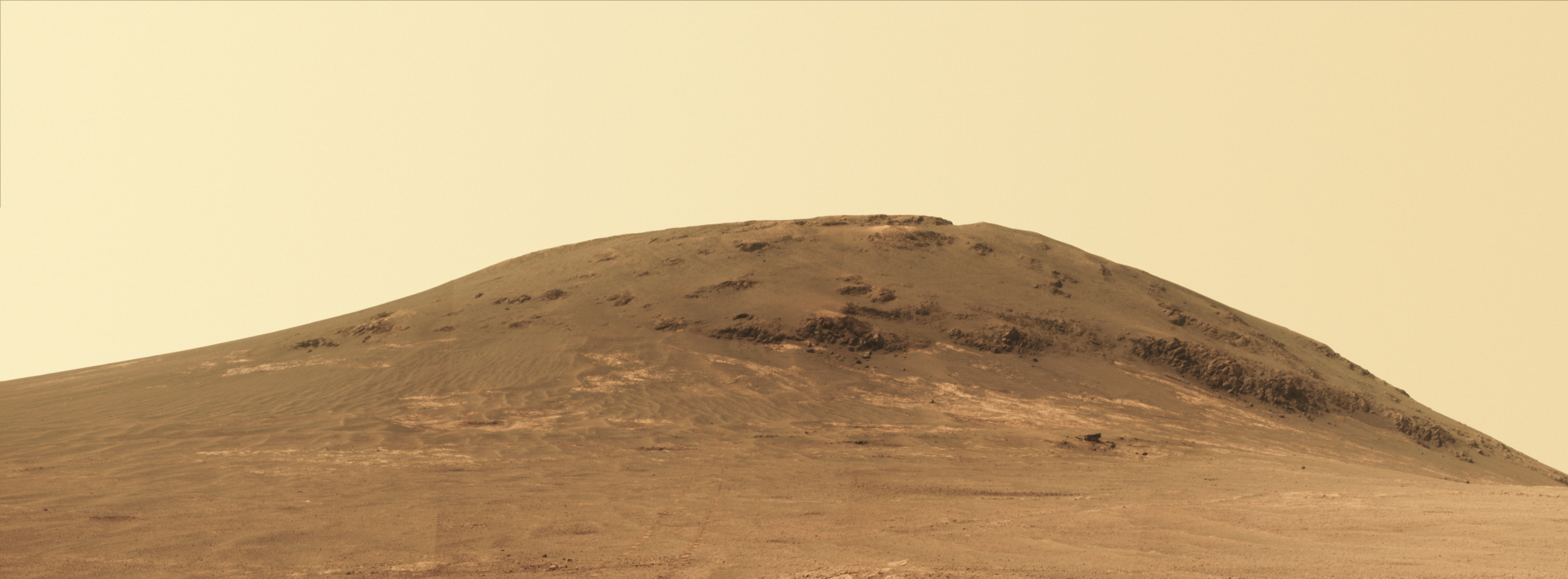
Opportunity looks north as it departs Cape Tribulation, its southern end shown here (April 2017)
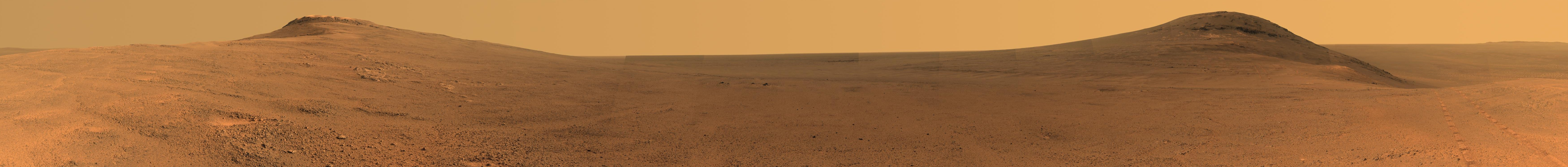
Panorama above Perseverance Valley (June 19, 2017)
Final panorama image taken by Opportunity between May and June 2018 prior to being disabled by the dust storms.
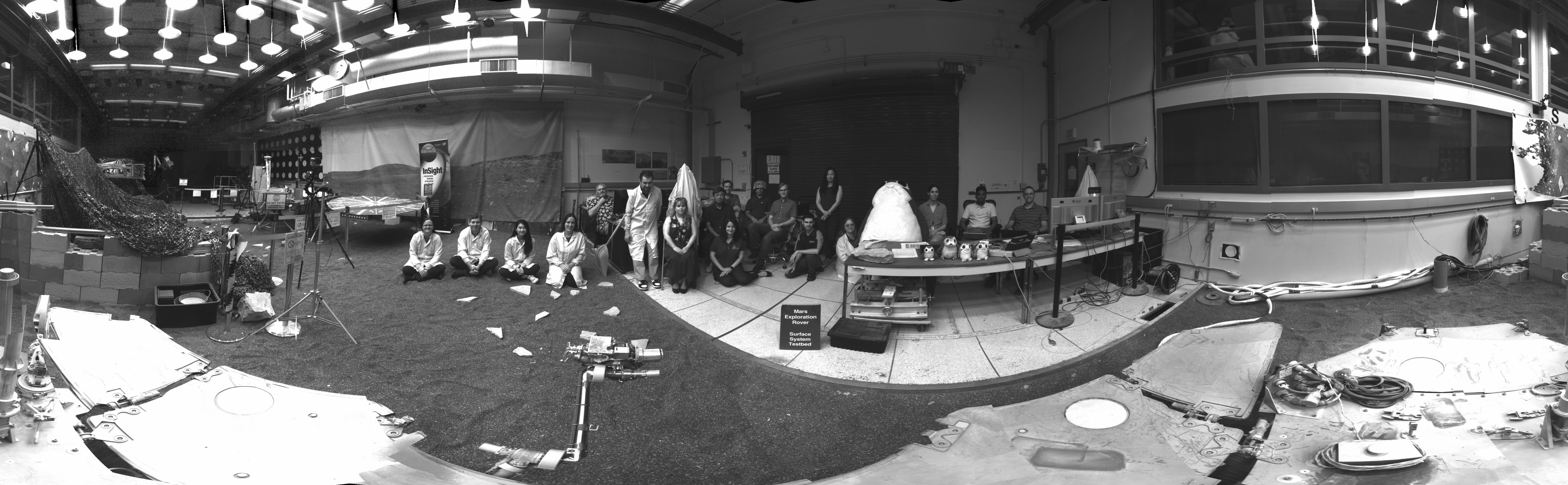
Panorama of the Opportunity rover team by "Dusty" – a testing replica of the rover on Earth (September 6, 2018).

=== Close-up images ===
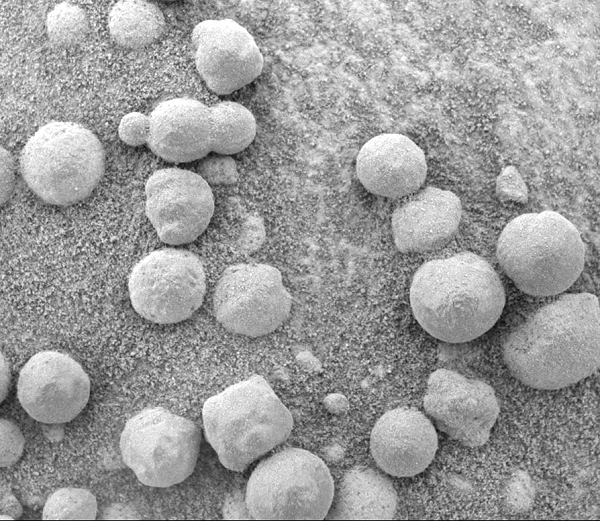
"Blueberries" (hematite spheres) on a rocky outcrop at Eagle Crater. Note the merged triplet in the upper left.

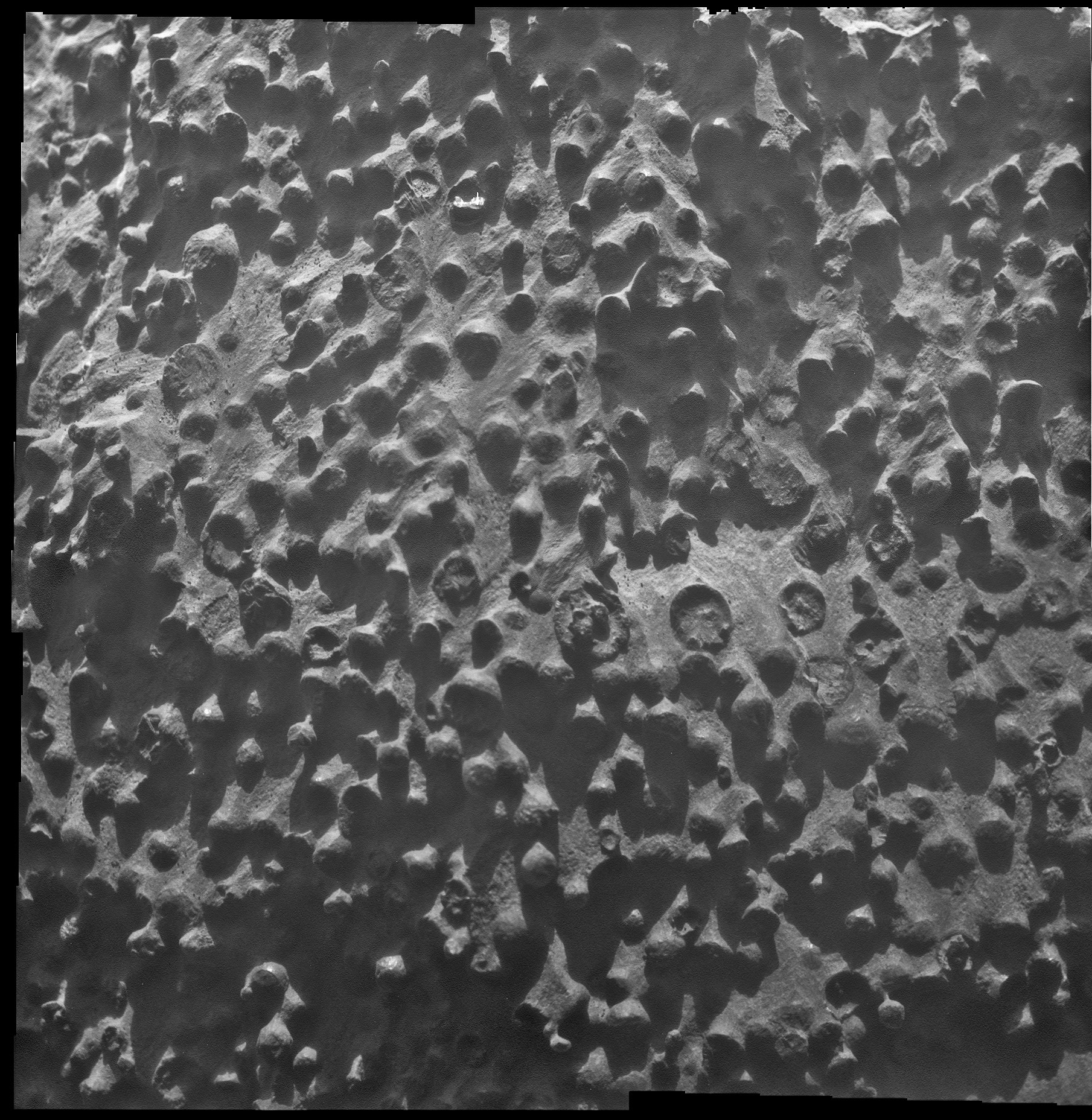
"Blueberries": This view displays an area about 6 centimeters across. It was taken at an outcrop named "Kirkwood" at the Cape York on the rim of Endeavour crater on Mars. The spheres seen here are about 3 millimeters in diameter. The Microscopic Imager took this image at 3064 sol.

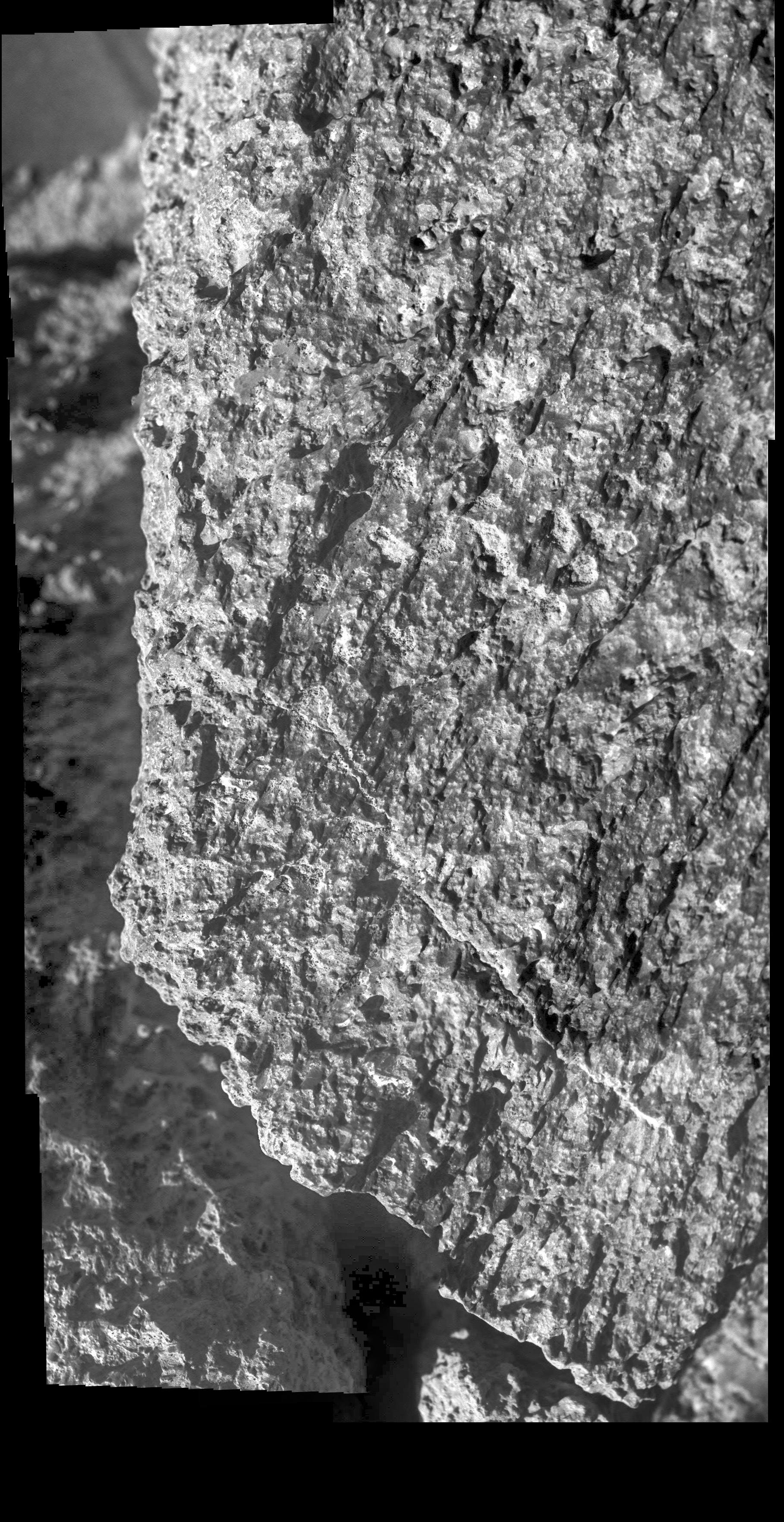
"Jornada del Muerto" - rock found in Perseverance Valley
(posted June 4, 2019)

=== From orbit ===
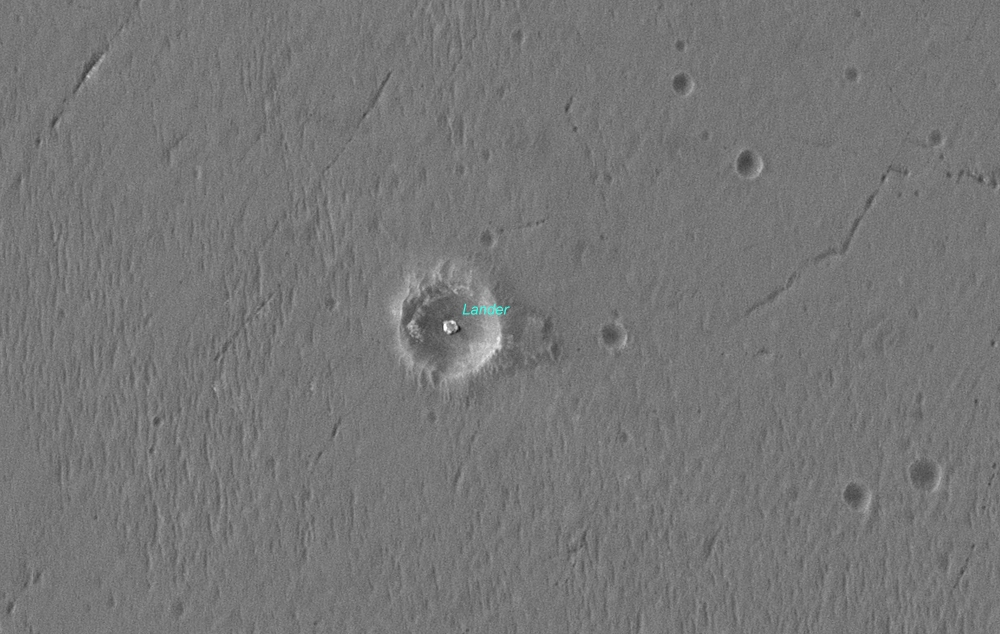
Opportunity landing site, lander, as imaged by MRO
(November 29, 2006)

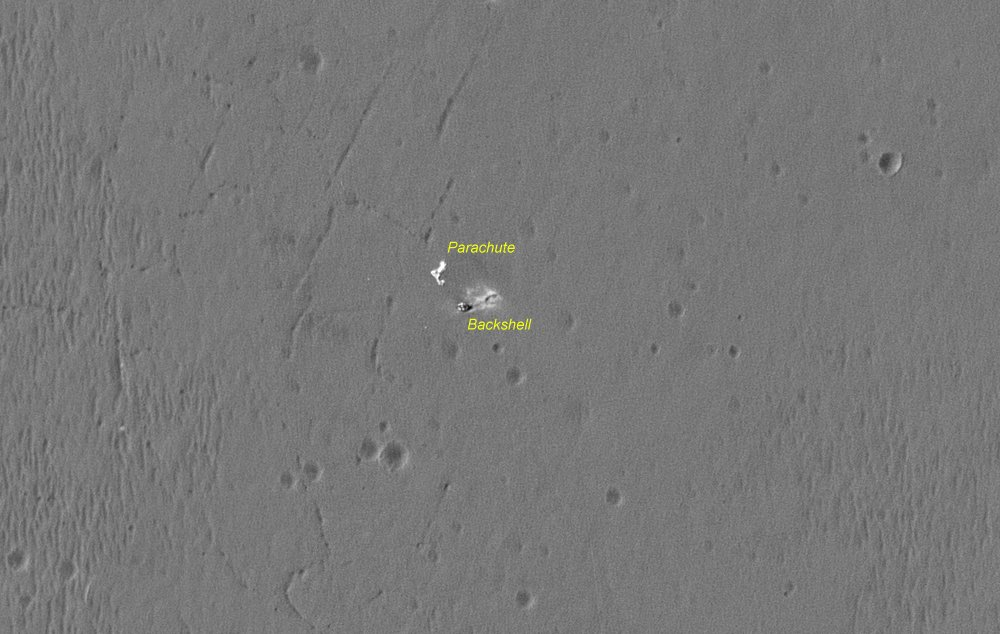
Opportunity landing site, parachute and backshell, as imaged by MRO (November 29, 2006)

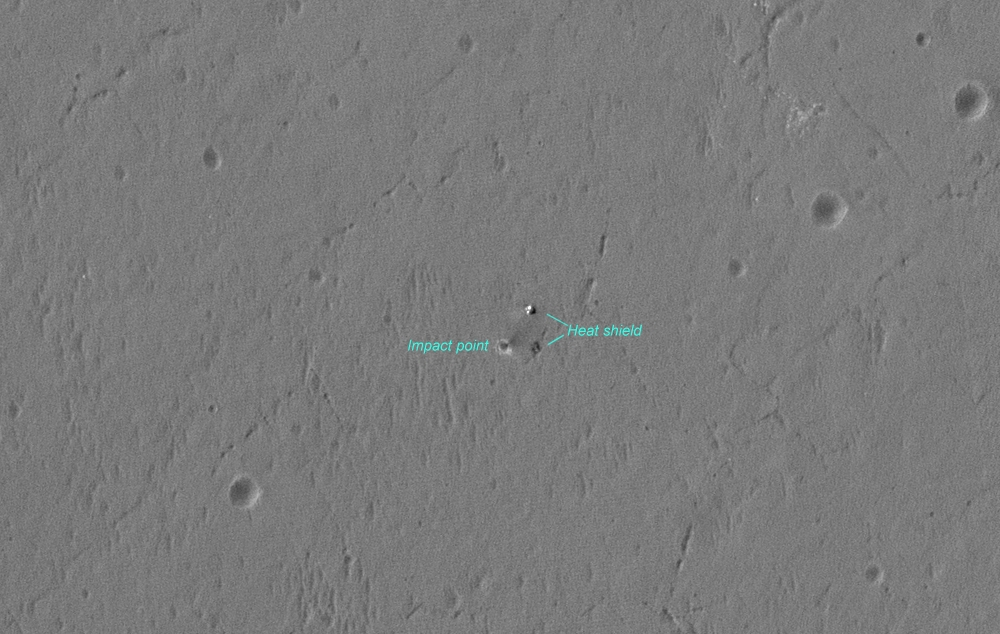
Opportunity landing site, heat shield, as imaged by MRO
(November 29, 2006)

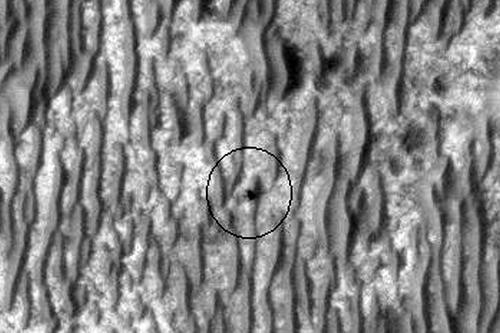
Opportunity (circled) as seen by HiRISE on January 29, 2009. Endeavour Crater is 17 km (11 mi) away.

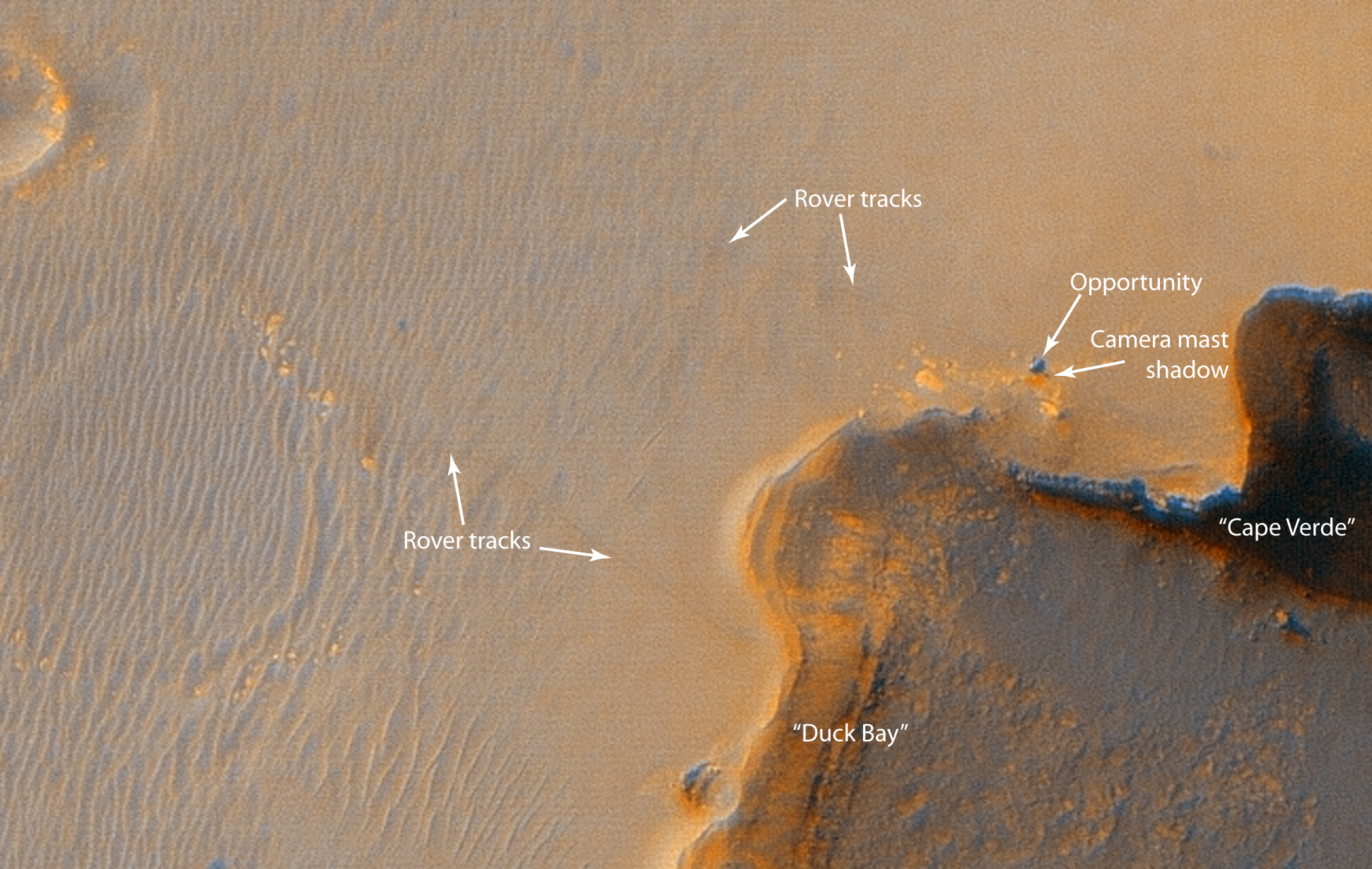
The Mars Exploration Rover Opportunity at the rim of Victoria crater as photographed from the Mars Reconnaissance Orbiter's HiRISE camera.

=== Area maps ===
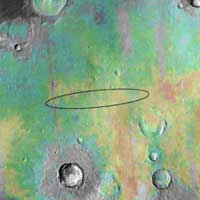
Opportunity landing ellipse in Meridiani Planum, near Endeavour crater

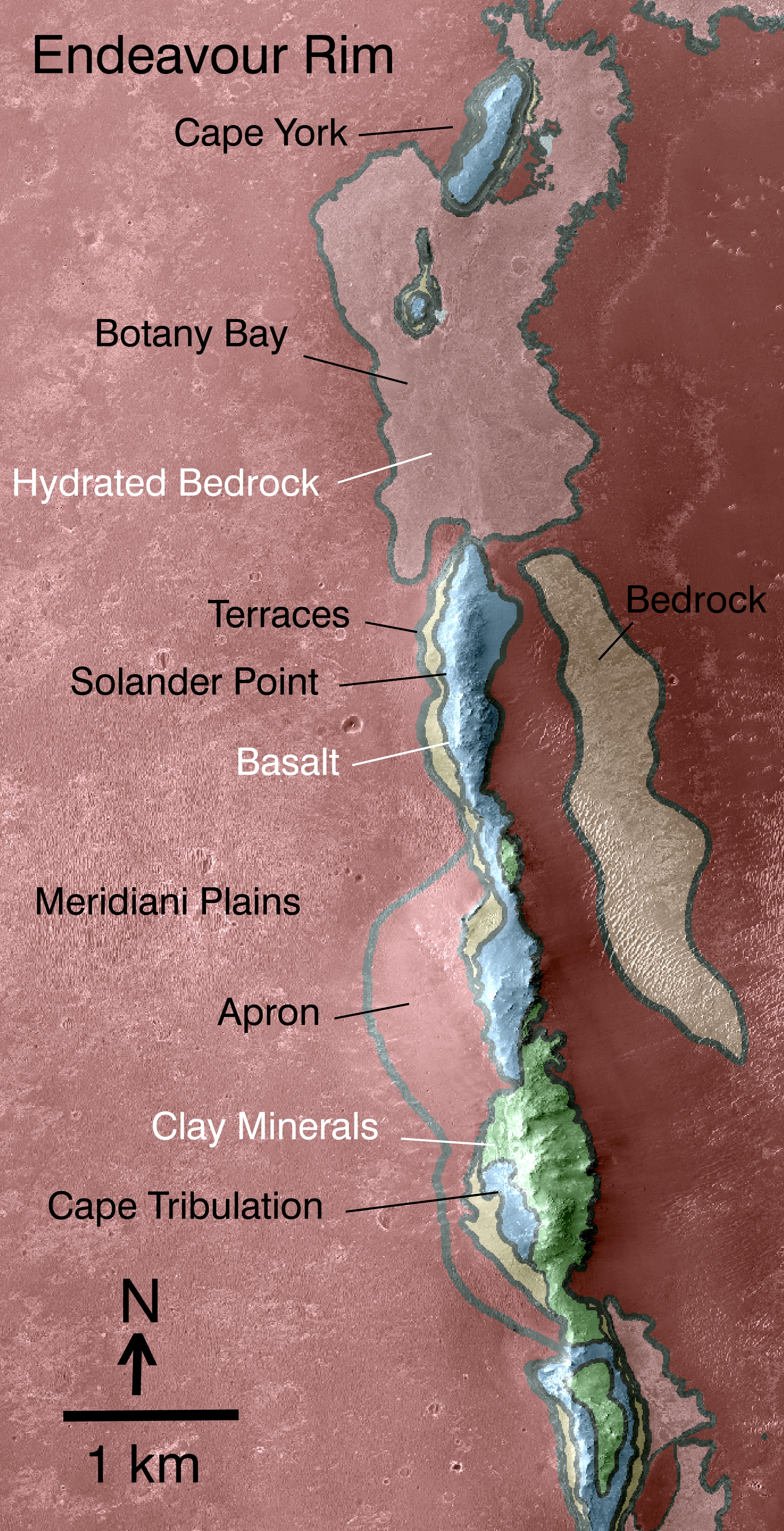
This geological map created from MRO's CRISM instrument data from orbit gives an overview of some of the geology in the area MER-B is exploring

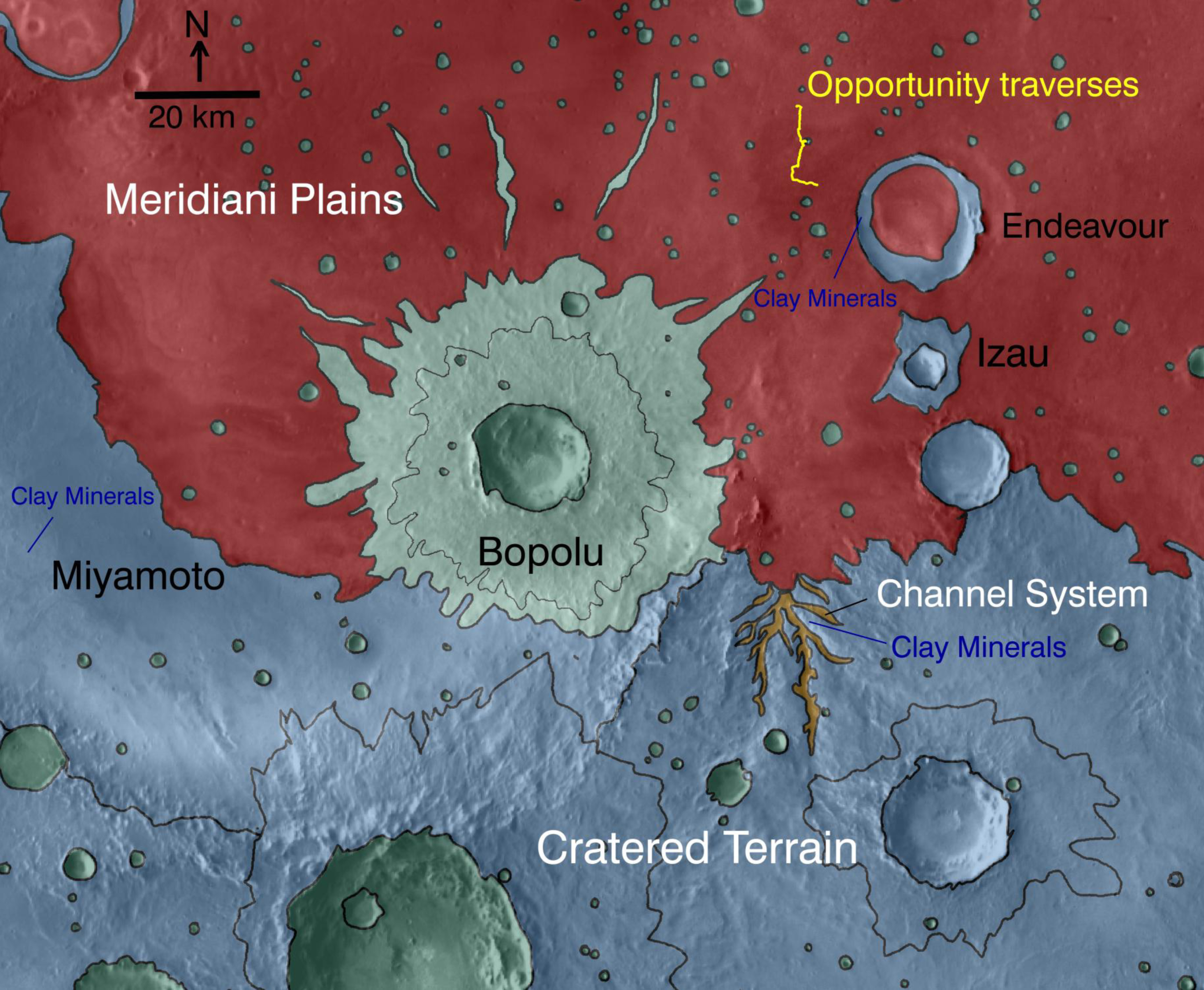
This map, color-coded for minerals (CRISM) and annotated, shows the rover's traverse up to about 2010 with some nearby features noted.

=== Traverse maps ===
An example of a rover traverse map featuring a line showing path of the rover, and mission sols, which are Mars days counted from its landing and typical of Mars surface mission time reporting. Topographic lines and various feature names are also common.

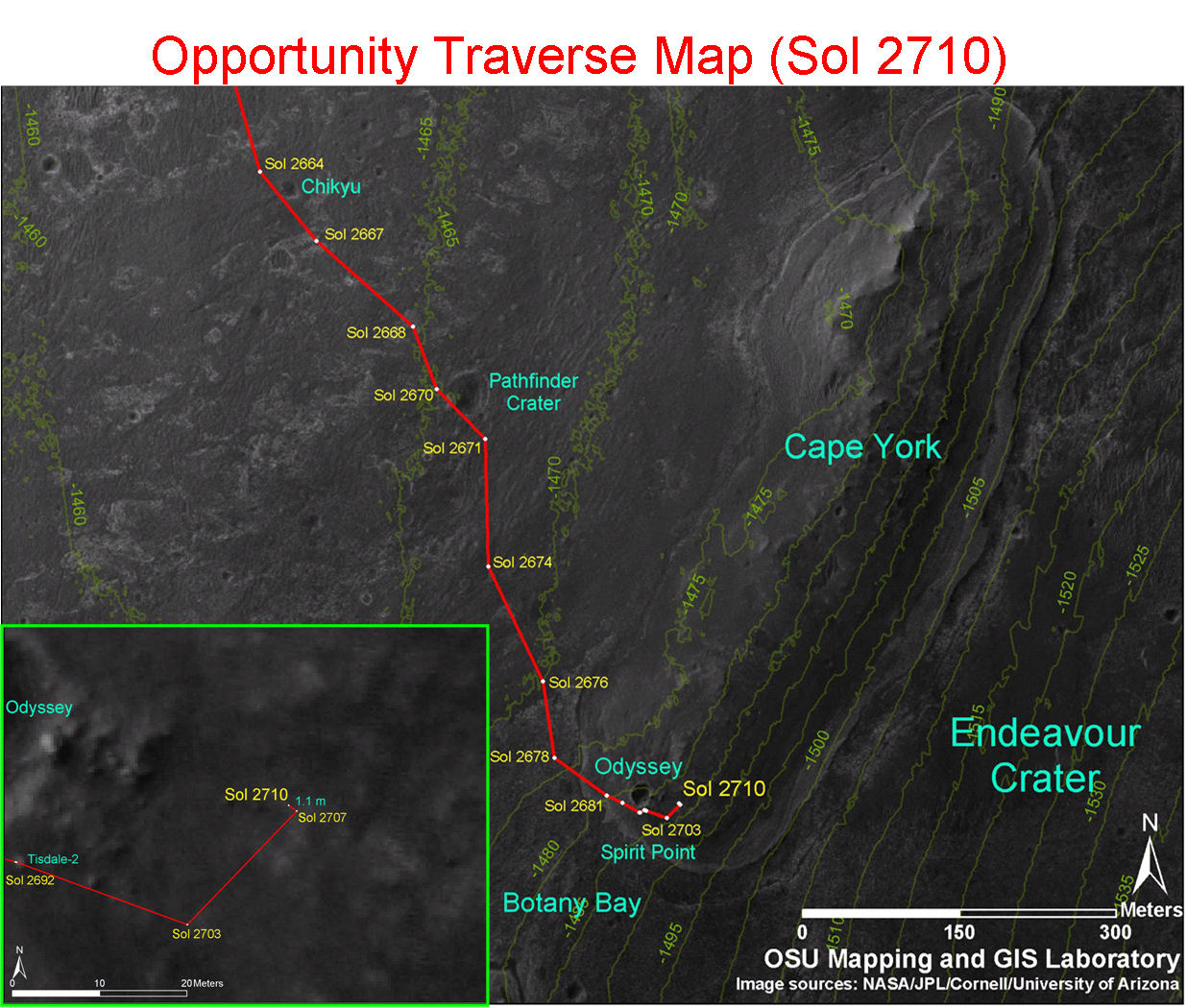
Opportunity arrives at Endeavour crater, Sol 2710

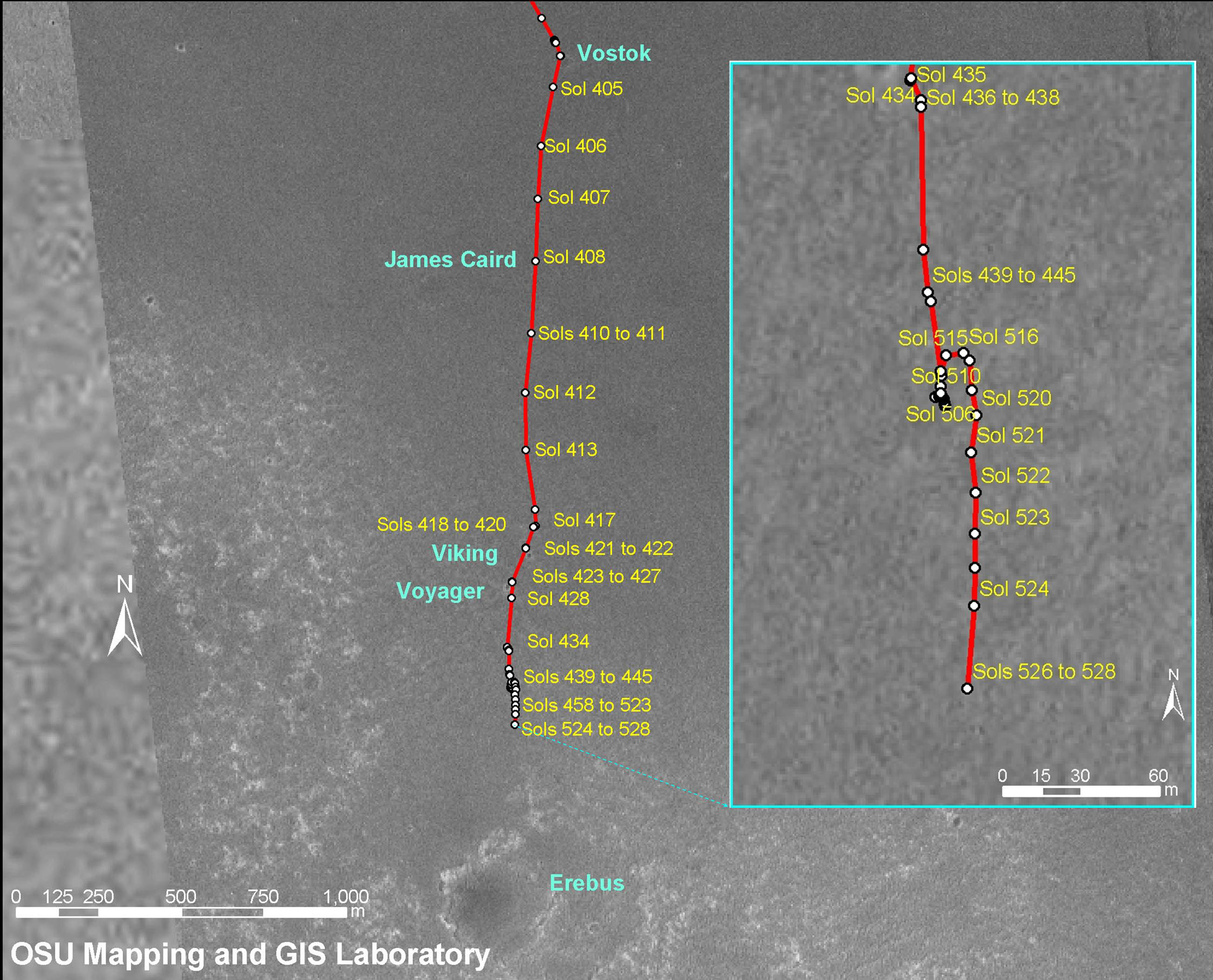
Opportunity traverse map, from Sol 405 to 528 (2005)

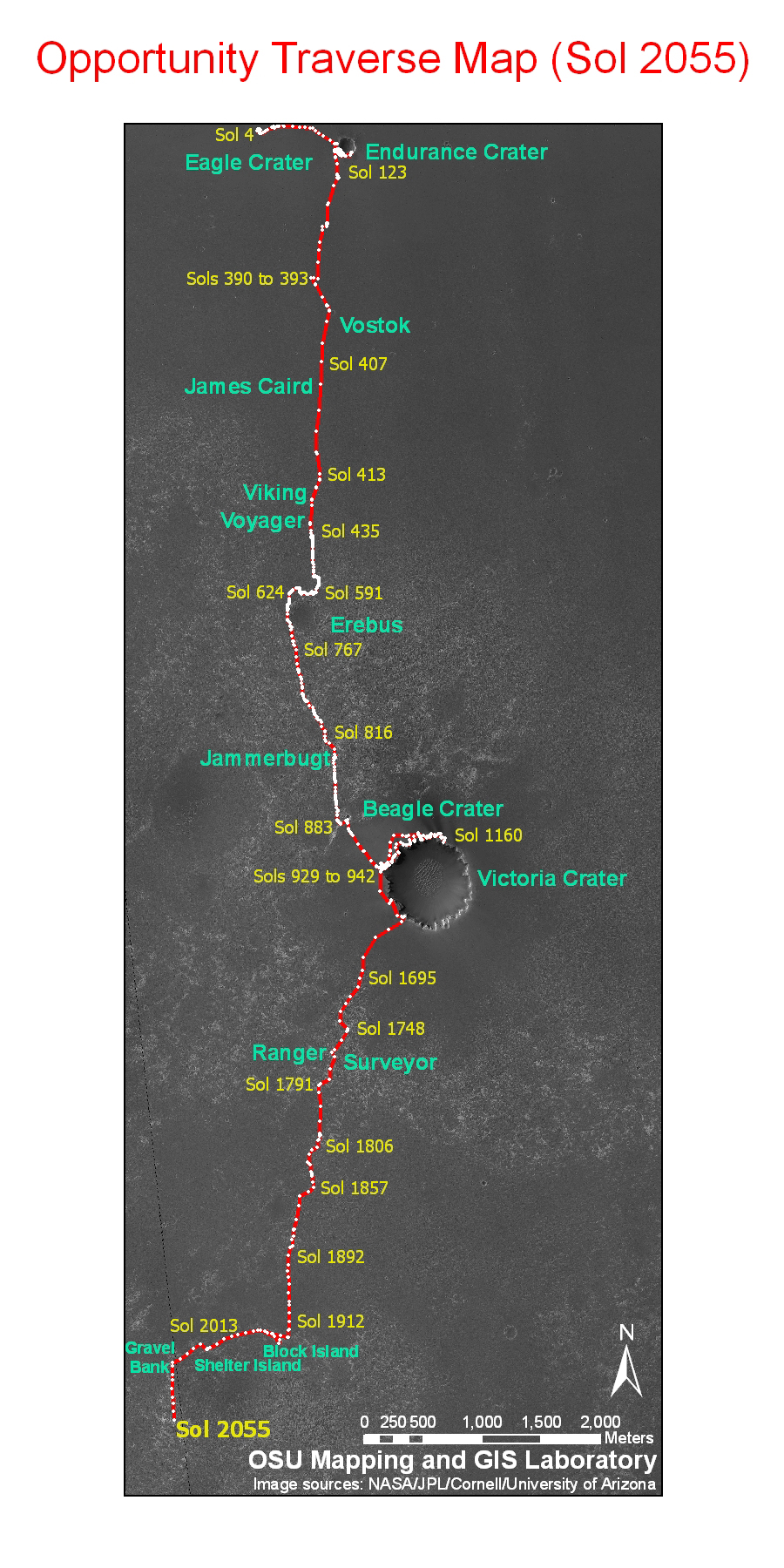
Opportunity traverse map, from sol 1 (2004) through sol 2055 (2009)

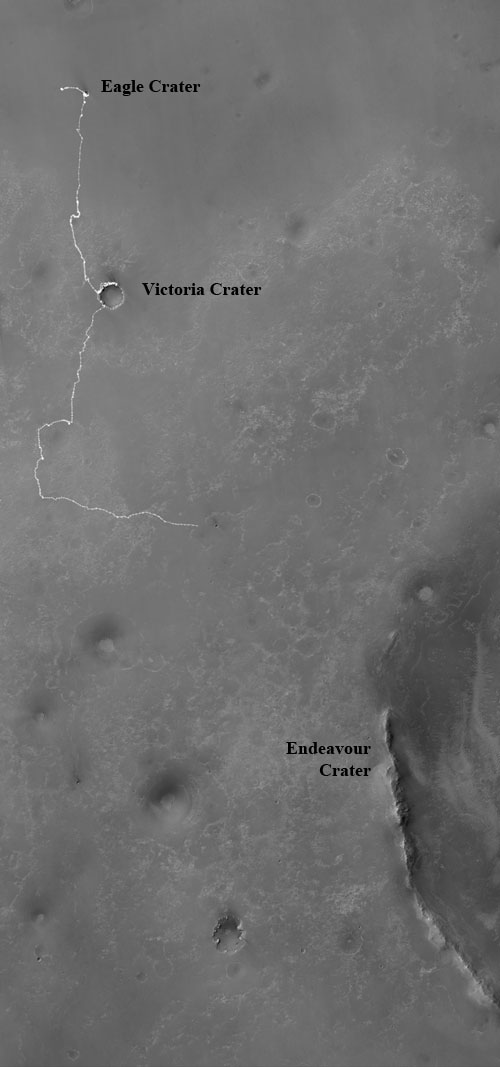
Annotated Opportunity traverse map as of December 8, 2010 (Sol 2442)

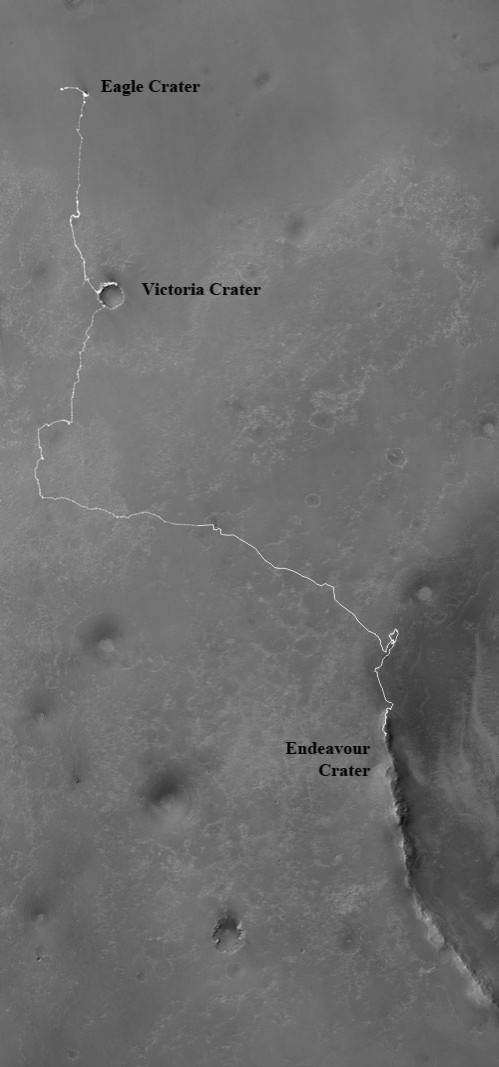
Annotated Opportunity traverse map as of June 11, 2014 (Sol 3689)

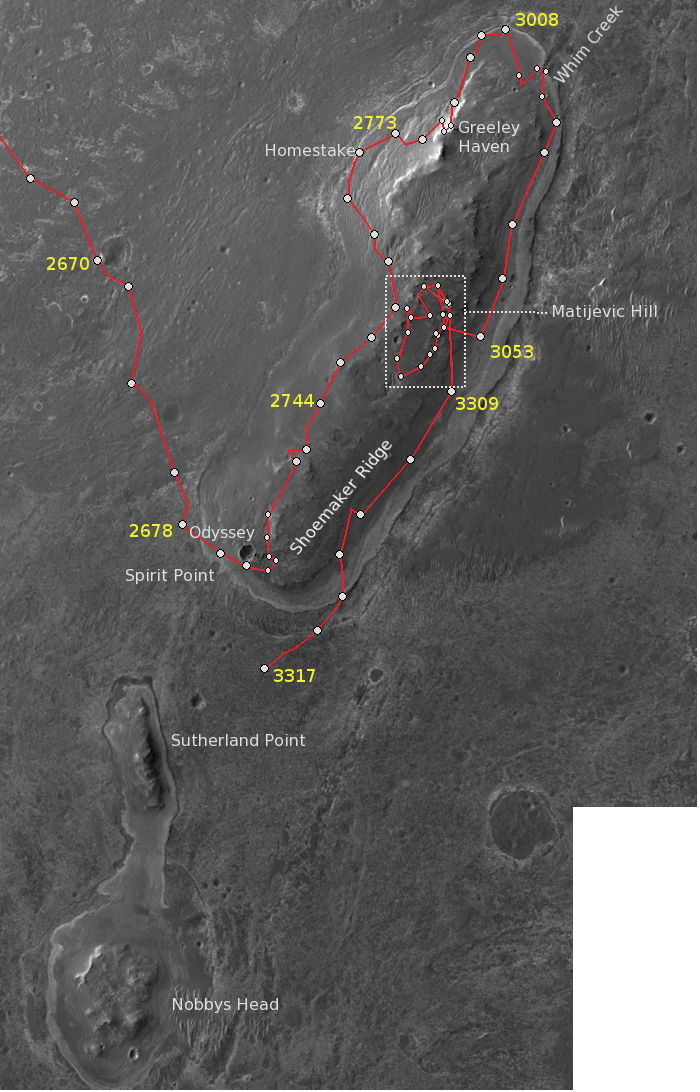
Opportunity's traverse on Cape York from Sol 2678 to Sol 3317 with some additional annotations of the main features.

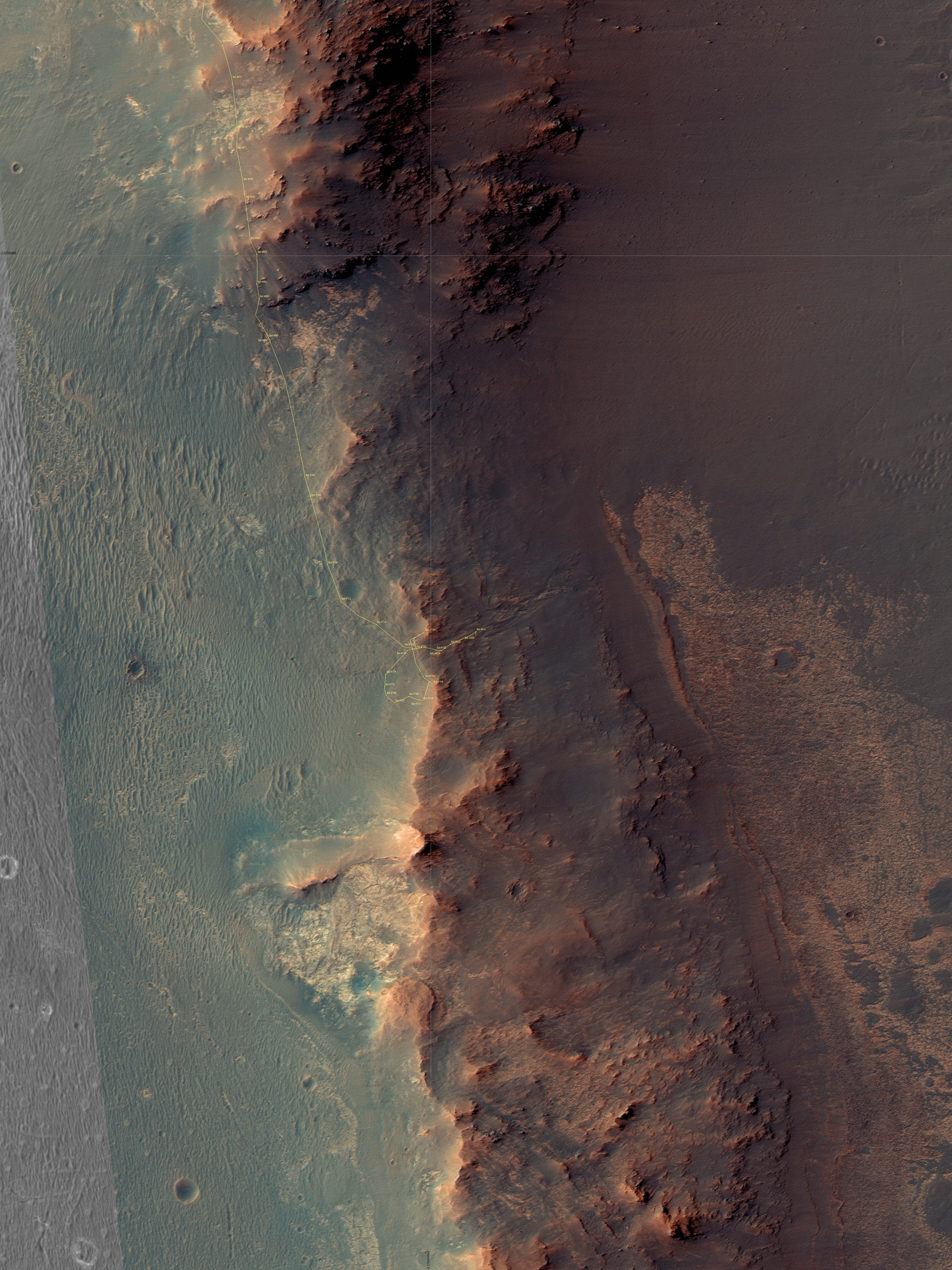
Traverse map up to 4836 (September 12, 2017)

== See also ==
- Curiosity rover timeline
- InSight
- Mars Express
- Perseverance rover timeline
- Sojourner rover timeline
- Spirit rover timeline
